= Stolen and missing Moon rocks =

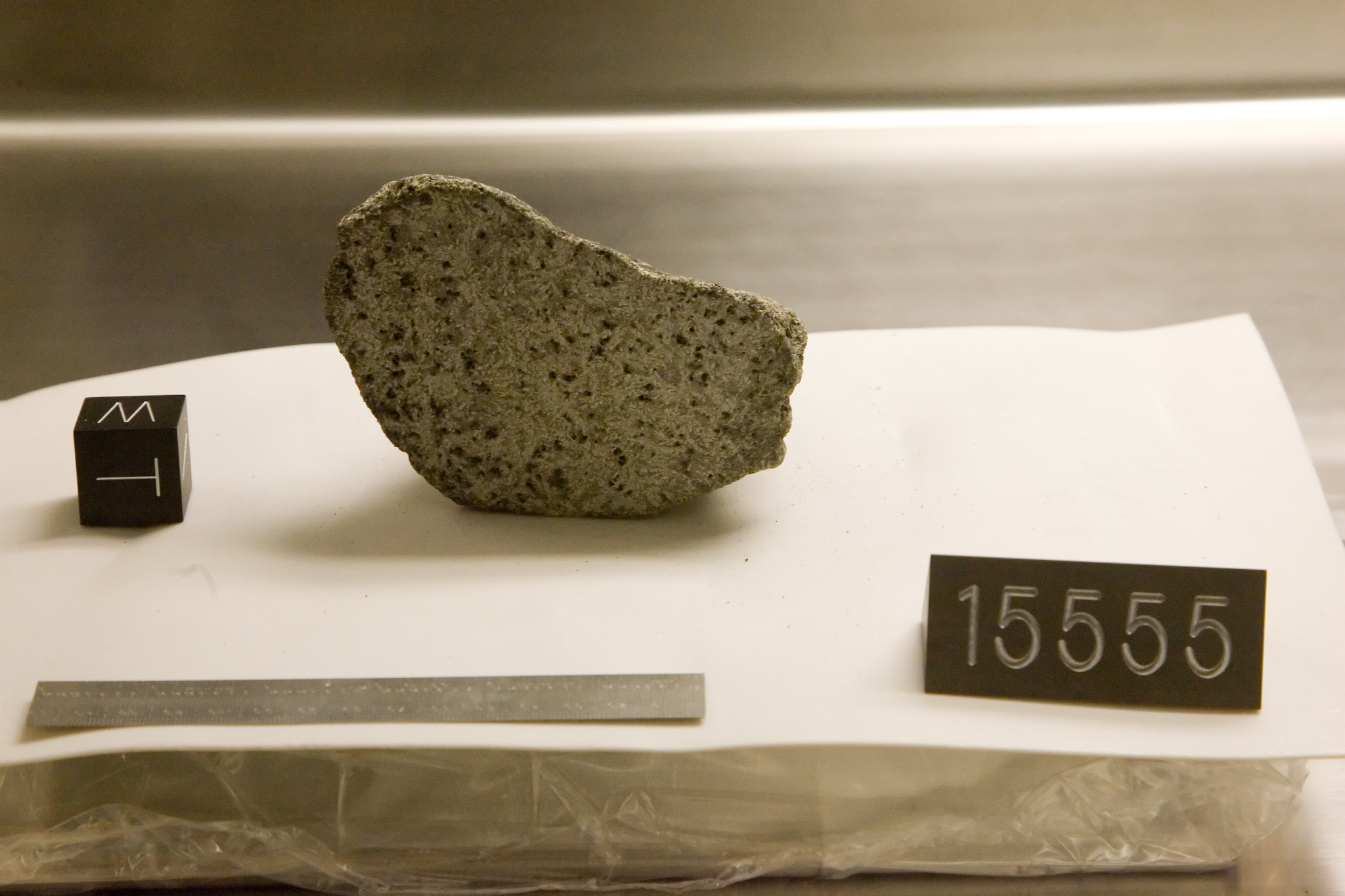
Sample from NASA's lunar surface collection at Johnson Space Center's vault in Houston, Texas

Of the 270 Apollo 11 Moon rocks and the Apollo 17 Moon rocks (dubbed the Goodwill rocks) that were given to the nations of the world by the Nixon Administration, approximately 180 are unaccounted for. Many of these rocks that are accounted for have been locked away in storage for decades. The location of the rocks has been tracked by researchers and hobbyists because of their rarity and the difficulty of obtaining more.

== Investigations ==
In 1998, a unique federal law enforcement undercover operation was created to identify and arrest individuals selling counterfeit Moon rocks. This sting operation was known as Operation Lunar Eclipse. Originally two undercover agents were involved in this sting, Senior Special Agent Joseph Gutheinz of NASA's Office of Inspector General (NASA OIG), posing as Tony Coriasso, and Inspector Bob Cregger of the United States Postal Inspection Service, posing as John Marta. This sting operation was later expanded to include agents from the United States Customs Service, namely, Special Agent Dwight Weikel and Special Agent Dave Atwood. The sting operation was led by NASA OIG Senior Special Agent Joseph Gutheinz. The sting operation recovered an Apollo era Moon rock, the Honduras Goodwill Moon Rock. This Moon rock had been given to Honduras by President Nixon, fallen into private hands, and then offered to the Agents for $5 million. In order to recover this Moon rock, the agents had to come up with the $5 million requested by the seller. Billionaire and one-time presidential candidate H. Ross Perot was asked by one of the agents to put up the money, and did so.

After leaving NASA for a teaching position at the University of Phoenix, in Arizona, Gutheinz challenged his criminal justice graduate students to locate the goodwill Moon rocks.

He subsequently extended this project to also cover the missing Apollo 11 Moon rocks President Nixon gave to the states and nations of the world in 1969. Hundreds of graduate students have participated in this project since 2002 and while many Moon rocks have been found, others are now known to be missing, stolen, or destroyed. Gutheinz patterned this college project after NASA's earlier Operation Lunar Eclipse, which he had participated in. Beginning in 2002, his graduate students began reporting to him that both the Cyprus Apollo 11 Moon rock (which is actually a collection of lunar dust in a Lucite ball) and Cyprus Apollo 17 Goodwill Moon Rock (a pebble-size Moon rock) were missing. Operation Lunar Eclipse and the Moon Rock Project were the subject of the 2012 book The Case of the Missing Moon Rocks by Joe Kloc.

== Missing gifted rocks ==
=== United States ===
==== Delaware ====
The Apollo 11 display was stolen in 1976.

==== New Jersey ====
An Apollo 11 sample is on display in the New Jersey State Museum. Experts and politicians in New Jersey, including former Governor Brendan Byrne, are unaware where the Apollo 17 sample was, or if the state even received it.

=== International ===
==== Brazil ====
The Apollo 11 display is missing.

==== Canada ====
The Apollo 11 display is missing.

==== Cyprus ====
While the Apollo 17 Goodwill Moon rock presented to Cyprus was recovered, the Apollo 11 rock given to the country remains missing.

In his June 26, 2011 Op/Ed appearing in the Cyprus Mail entitled "Houston we have a problem: we didn't give Cyprus its moon rock", Joseph Gutheinz revealed that after NASA recovered the Cyprus Apollo 17 Goodwill Moon Rock over a year ago they failed to give the Moon rock to its legal owner, the nation of Cyprus.

==== Honduras ====
The Apollo 11 display is missing. The Apollo 17 display was stolen and later recovered.

==== Ireland ====
The Apollo 11 rock presented to Ireland was accidentally discarded in a landfill known as the Dunsink Landfill in October 1977 following a fire that consumed the Meridian room library at the Dublin Dunsink Observatory where the rock was displayed. Cleo Luff, a student from the University of Phoenix, obtained this information after her investigation into the Moon rock's location for a class she had with Professor Joseph Gutheinz. The Apollo 17 Goodwill Rock remains with the National Museum of Ireland.

==== Malta ====
On May 18, 2004, Malta's Goodwill Moon Rock was stolen from Malta's Museum of Natural History in Mdina. According to an Associated Press story appearing in USA Today, "there are no surveillance cameras and no custodians at the Museum of Natural History because of insufficient funding. The only attendant is the ticket-seller"... "A Maltese flag displayed next to the rock — which the U.S. astronauts had taken up with them — was not taken". Joseph Gutheinz, a retired NASA Office of Inspector General Special Agent who heads up a "Moon Rock Project" at the University of Phoenix (where he assigns his students the task of hunting down missing Moon rocks), urged the Maltese authorities to grant an amnesty period to the thieves. He advised that only an amateur thief would have taken the Maltese Goodwill Moon Rock and left the plaque and flag behind, as all three together would have been self-authenticating and eliminated the risk of a geologist needing to authenticate the Moon rock.

Malta's Goodwill Moon Rock has not been recovered and continues to be actively pursued.

==== Nicaragua ====
The Apollo 11 display was stolen and later recovered. The Apollo 17 display is missing.

==== Romania ====
University of Phoenix graduate students uncovered evidence that the Romania Goodwill Moon Rock may have been auctioned off by the estate of its executed former leader Nicolae Ceaușescu. Both Nicolae Ceaușescu and his wife, Elena Ceaușescu, were executed by firing squad on December 25, 1989, for the crime of genocide. As late as 2009, Romania believed it only received one Moon rock from the Nixon Administration, the Apollo 11 Moon rock, and took issue with those who argued otherwise. Joseph Gutheinz provided Daniel Ionascu of the Jurnalul information from the U.S. National Archives which showed that the Romanian Goodwill Moon Rock was presented to Romania. Romania's Apollo 11 Moon Rock is at the National History Museum in Bucharest.

==== Spain ====
Evidence surfaced that both Spain's Apollo 11 Moon Rock and Apollo 17 Goodwill Moon Rock which were given to General Francisco Franco's Administration by the Nixon Administration were missing. Pablo Jáuregui, the Science Editor of El Mundo, a Spanish newspaper, disclosed in a July 20, 2009 story entitled: "Franco's grandson: My mother lost the lunar rock that was given to my grandfather." that the Spanish Apollo 17 Goodwill Moon Rock had finally been given back to the people of Spain in 2007 by the family of Admiral Luis Carrero; and Jáuregui suggested that Spain's Apollo 11 Moon Rock, as referenced in the title of the story, was last known to be in Franco's family's hands, and is now unaccounted for. Jáuregui wrote that Luis Carrero Blanco the son of Admiral Carrero Blanco stated "As for the stone that Kissinger gave Carrero Blanco, the stone was in possession of the family (first in the home of his widow, and after that of his eldest son ), until in 2007 they decided to donate it to the Naval Museum, where it is on display today, along with a Spanish flag which traveled aboard the 1972 Apollo 17 mission to the Moon. "My son told me that the gift was dedicated to 'The Spanish people', so it seemed right to donate it," recalls Luis Carrero Blanco. Admiral Carrero Blanco was assassinated while in Office by ETA, a Basque separatist organization recognized as terrorist by Spain, France, the UK and the US, but not (anymore) by the European Union.

As for Spain's Apollo 11 Moon Rock the trail is more confused. Jáuregui relates the following from Franco's grandson: "The grandson of Franco stressed that neither he nor any other member of his family" had been told "that there might be some legal or ethical problem" regarding the Moon rock. "If you are given something and it's yours, why shouldn't you sell it?" He said. "In any case the rock was never sold", but according to Franco, at the moment it is not known where it is. "As my mother is a woman with many things in many houses, in a move or redecorating a room, in the end it must have got lost," he explains. Students assigned to the Moon Rock Project are currently looking for leads to Spain's Apollo 11 Moon Rock in Switzerland.

==== Sweden ====
The Apollo 11 plaque display was stolen from the Swedish Museum of Natural History in Stockholm on September 7, 2002.

== Recovered gifted rocks ==
=== United States ===
==== Alaska ====
Elizabeth Riker was assigned the task of locating the Alaska Apollo 11 Moon Rock by her professor. On August 18, 2010, in a story she wrote about her investigation in the Capital City Weekly newspaper, of Juneau, Alaska, she stated that after conducting a thorough investigation for Alaska's Apollo 11 Moon Rock she has concluded that it is missing. She advised that she planned to continue to look for the Moon rock and asked for the help of the citizens of Alaska to accomplish her goal of finding it.

In 1973, there had been a massive fire at the Alaska Transportation Museum where the Moon rocks were being housed. Coleman Anderson (a crab-fishing captain who was on the TV show Deadliest Catch) claimed to have gone to the museum to scrounge through the garbage from the fire to see if there would be anything worth saving. Anderson, who was a child at the time, claimed to have found the Moon rocks and cleaned them up over the next few years.

To clear title to the rocks he filed a lawsuit against the State of Alaska, asking the Court to deem the rocks his sole property.

The missing Moon rocks were returned by Anderson as of December 7, 2012.

==== Arkansas ====
In a front-page story, the Arkansas Democrat-Gazette listed numerous sources suggesting the Arkansas Goodwill Moon Rock had gone missing, noting that the rock was potentially worth five million dollars. The rock was presented to the state by astronaut Richard H. Truly in 1976 at a Boy Scout event in Little Rock. Its whereabouts remained unknown until September 21, 2011, when it was discovered by Michael Hodge, an archivist with the Butler Center for Arkansas Studies, while processing the gubernatorial papers of Bill Clinton.

==== Colorado ====
Based on the investigation of a graduate student, former governor John Vanderhoof, then age 88, acknowledged he had the Goodwill Moon Rock presented to the people of Colorado in his personal possession and agreed to give it back to the state. On August 25, 2010, the Colorado Goodwill Moon Rock was unveiled at the Colorado School of Mines Geology Museum by Dr. Bruce Geller, the museum curator.

==== Hawaii ====
Flaws in the State of Hawaii inventory control system were highlighted in 2009 when an estimated $10 million in Moon rocks from Apollo 11 and the Apollo 17 Goodwill Rock could not be located. Curators and officials at every museum and university in the state, along with then Governor Linda Lingle's office, capitol, and state archives, were contacted but none knew of the whereabouts of the items. Both Moon rocks were later found in a "routine inventory of gifts given to the governor's office over the years," in a locked cabinet in the Governor's Office. A senior advisor to the governor vowed to increase security and register the items with the state's Foundation of Cultural Arts.

==== Louisiana ====
Louisiana's Apollo 17 Moon rock was returned to the state in late 2020, hand delivered to the Louisiana State Museum by an anonymous Florida man. The state's Apollo 11 Moon rock is in the collection of the Louisiana Art and Science Museum.

==== Missouri ====
Confusion erupted in 2010 when employees with the Missouri State Museum and the Missouri State Department of Natural Resources claimed that Missouri's Apollo 17 Goodwill Moon Rock was in storage. Photos in news stories about the location of the rock were later identified as coming from Apollo 11. Then Senator Kit Bond, who was the governor of Missouri when the Apollo 17 Goodwill Moon Rock was gifted to the state, stated that he has no recollection of receiving a Moon rock and the Missouri State Archives, and the State Museum, reversing what they had previously stated, had no information on Missouri having the Apollo 17 Goodwill Moon Rock concluding that it was presumed missing. The rock was later found among Bond's possessions by his staff and it was returned to the state.

==== North Carolina ====
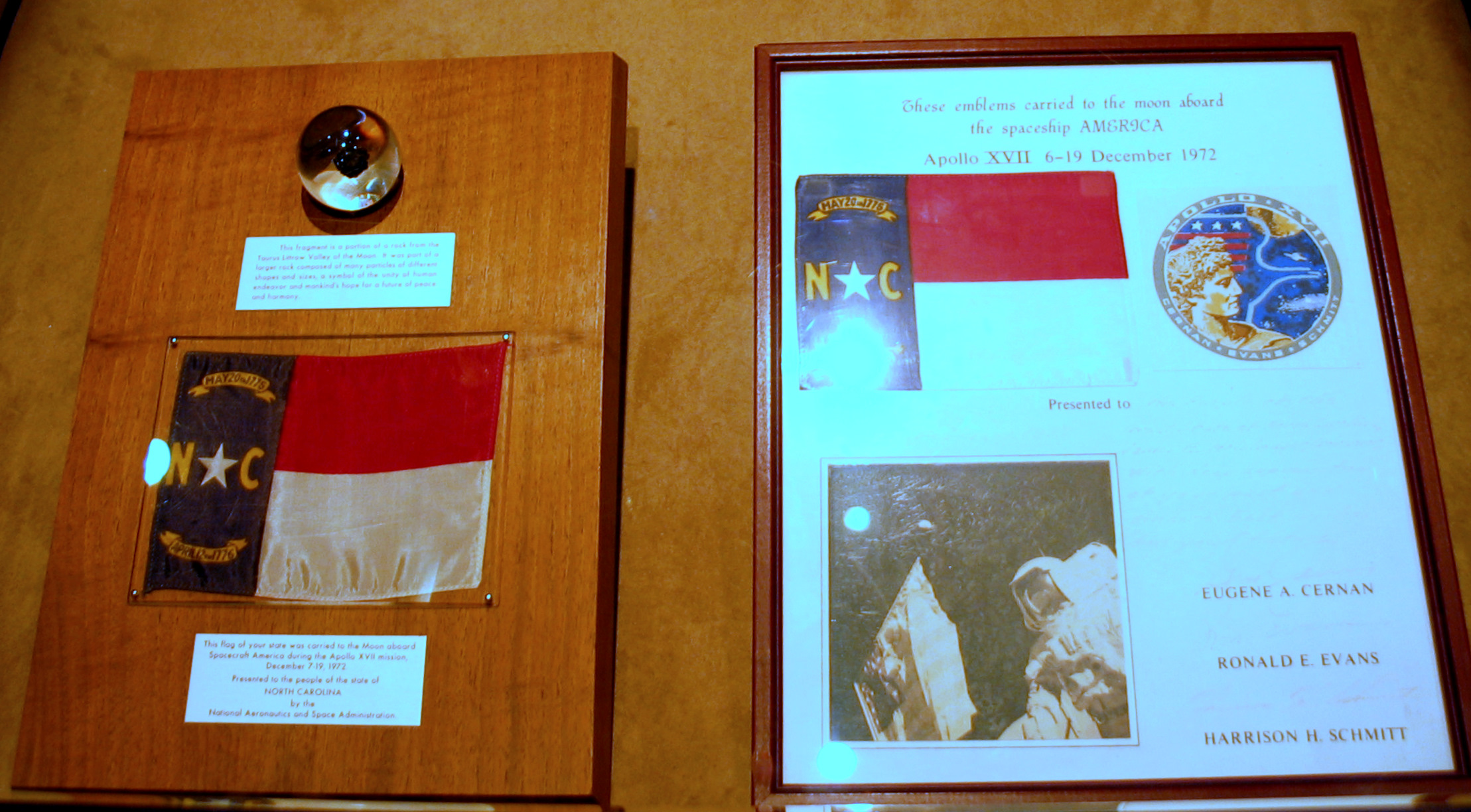
North Carolina's Goodwill Moon Rock along with other Apollo 17 flown items on temporary display at the NC Museum of Natural Sciences during a special event on the launch of STS-133

Professor Christopher Brown, Director of the N.C. Space Grant and professor at the University of North Carolina Chapel Hill turned the Moon rock over, along with related items, to the North Carolina Museum of Natural Sciences where it was planned for permanent display in the Fall of 2011 when the museum expansion was completed. Brown obtained the rock from a colleague in 2003 who found it in a desk drawer at the state Commerce Department. Brown's colleague received permission to lend the artifact to Brown who used it in presentations on space and space-related science to students over the next several years.

==== Oregon ====
Toni Dowdell, a graduate student at the University of Phoenix, was assigned the task of hunting down the Oregon Apollo 11 Moon Rock while two of her teammates were charged with hunting down the Apollo 17 Goodwill Moon Rocks of Oregon and Louisiana. Toni Dowdell and her two teammates received this assignment from her professor, a retired senior special agent with NASA's Office of Inspector General. This assignment was part of an ongoing assignment known as the Moon Rock Project, where students are assigned the task of hunting down Moon rocks all over America and the world. In a February 19, 2010 article Toni Dowdell wrote for the Daily News of Greenville, Michigan, Dowdell described how her teammates in this investigation discerned that both the Apollo 17 Goodwill Moon Rocks of Oregon and of Louisiana remain unaccounted for, but how she successfully tracked down her assigned Moon rock, the Oregon Apollo 11 Moon Rock. As with many Moon rock gifts the Nixon Administration gave to the states and the nations of the world, the first problem she encountered was a lack of a document trail. However, by reaching out to people, to include an operator in the state Capitol, she found the Moon rock hidden in the ceremonial Governor's Office of Oregon. According to Moon rocks researcher Robert Pearlman, the Oregon Apollo 17 rock display is on permanent exhibit in the Earth Science Hall of the Oregon Museum of Science and Industry in Portland.

==== West Virginia ====
Sandra Shelton, a graduate student at the University of Phoenix, was assigned the task of hunting down the West Virginia Apollo 17 Goodwill Moon Rock by her professor, a retired senior special agent with NASA's Office of Inspector General. This Moon rock was presented to West Virginia in 1974 and is valued at $5 million. On May 16, 2010, Rick Steelhammer of the Gazette-Mail of Charleston, West Virginia, wrote a front-page story documenting Sandra Shelton's investigative findings which revealed that the West Virginia Goodwill Moon Rock was missing. Following that story, retired dentist Robert Conner called Shelton and told her that he had the West Virginia Goodwill Moon Rock. Shelton informed her professor, who advised the Governor's Office. Dr. Conner said that his deceased brother was the former business partner of former West Virginia governor Arch A. Moore, Jr., and that Conner acquired the Moon rock upon the death of his brother from his brother's belongings. In her June 29 story appearing in the Denver Post, reporter Sarah Horn wrote that Shelton was awarded a certificate by the governor of West Virginia, Joe Manchin, for her role in recovering the West Virginia Goodwill Moon Rock.

=== International ===
==== Canada ====
In 1972, then 13-year-old Jaymie Matthews, now professor emeritus in astronomy and astrophysics at the University of British Columbia, lied about his age in order to compete in an essay contest, the winner of which would serve as a participant in a "10-day International Youth Science Tour, in which all the countries in the United Nations were invited to offer up "youth ambassadors" aged 17 to 21. These youth ambassadors were to witness first-hand the launch in Florida..." of Apollo 17…" Eighty countries accepted the invitation, including Canada. Matthews won the contest, and when his true age came out, Canadian officials decided to let him go anyway. As the student ambassador, it was decided that Canada's Goodwill Moon Rock would be mailed to him, and he kept it at his home. Eventually he was asked to turn the Moon rock over to Canada, which he did. The rock was reportedly stolen in 1978, while on tour.

In 2003, University of Phoenix graduate students tracked down the rock to a storage facility at the Canadian Museum of Nature. After 30 years of sitting in storage, the Canadian Goodwill Moon Rock finally went on display at the Canada Science and Technology Museum in Ottawa, on July 23, 2009.

==== Colombia ====
Misael Pastrana Borrero, as President of Colombia between 1970 and 1974, received from Neil Armstrong (Note: On behalf of then United States President Richard Nixon.) both lunar sample displays which he kept on his desk at the Casa de Nariño. Allegedly believing that the displays were a personal diplomatic gift, Pastrana kept the Moon rocks after the end of his presidential term as interior decoration in the living room of his private residence in Bogotá.

It was not until 1980 when journalist Daniel Samper Pizano, in search of the missing lunar displays, embarked on a mission that included contacting the Embassy of the United States in Bogotá, which confirmed that the displays were not a personal gift to then President Pastrana but rather to all people of Colombia. Having received this information, Samper published an article with the allegation that Pastrana had stolen the lunar displays, prompting Juan Carlos Pastrana, son of Misael Pastrana Borrero, to bestow the displays to the Bogotá Planetarium on behalf of his father.

Since their return to public hands, the lunar sample displays remained in secured storage within the Bogotá Planetarium until 2003 when they were displayed for the first time to the public as part of the planetarium's permanent collection.

==== Cyprus ====
Moon rocks from Apollo 11 and Apollo 17 presented to the island nation of Cyprus were believed to have been destroyed or stolen in 1974 during the Turkish invasion. In September 2009, while cooperating with a worldwide hunt for Moon rocks with Associated Press reporter Toby Sterling (Netherlands Bureau) and Cyprus Mail reporter Lucy Millett, the daughter of the British Ambassador to Cyprus, Gutheinz was advised by his friend and space memorabilia expert Robert Pearlman who had learned in 2003 that the Cyprus Goodwill Moon Rock was never presented to Cyprus, but retained by the son of an American diplomat. The American government was advised about this situation in 2003 and did nothing. Upon learning the truth Gutheinz reached out to both the American Embassy in Cyprus and the Cyprus Government to convey the facts; he then filed a request for a Congressional Inquiry into the case of the missing Cyprus Goodwill Moon Rock. Subsequently, he caused the facts about the Moon rock to be published in the press in order to motivate the person who had the Moon rock to do the right thing, and return it. The diplomat's son thereafter began negotiating with NASA's Office of Inspector General, and did so for 5 months until the Cyprus Goodwill Moon Rock was recovered. The diplomat's son's name has never been disclosed.

==== Honduras ====
During "Lunar Eclipse", Florida businessman Alan H. Rosen attempted to sell agents the 1.142 gram Goodwill Moon rock presented to Honduras for 5 million dollars. After two months of negotiations with Rosen, the Moon rock was seized from a Bank of America vault. The rock immediately became the subject of a 5-year civil suit, United States of America v. One Lucite Ball containing Lunar Material (one Moon Rock) and One Ten Inch by Fourteen Inch Wooden Plaque, which resulted in the forfeiture of the rock to the Federal Government on March 24, 2003. The rock was refurbished at Johnson Space Center, to be once again presented to the people of Honduras. In a September 22, 2003 ceremony at NASA's Headquarters in Washington, D.C., NASA Administrator Sean O'Keefe presented the Moon rock to Honduran Ambassador Mario M. Canahuati. Also in attendance at this ceremony was Joseph Gutheinz, the leader of the sting operation, who gave a first hand account of the rock's recovery to Ambassador Canahuati. On February 28, 2004, O'Keefe flew to Honduras to formally present the Moon rock to Honduran president Ricardo Maduro. In 2007, Gutheinz, a past recipient of the NASA Exceptional Service Medal, was featured in the BBC Two documentary Moon for Sale talking about the Honduras Goodwill Moon Rock and this unique case. Today the Honduras Goodwill Moon Rock is on display at the Centro Interactivo Chiminike, an education center in Tegucigalpa that receives hundreds of young student visitors per day."

==== Ireland ====
The Irish Apollo 17 Goodwill Moon Rock is located at the National Museum of Ireland. The Apollo 17 Goodwill Moon Rock was given to Irish President Erskine Childers who later died in office. When the widow of President Childers, Rita Dudley Childers, requested the rock as a keepsake of her late husband, the request was denied, as the Irish Government reasoned the Irish Goodwill Moon Rock belonged to the people of Ireland and not just to one individual.

==== Nicaragua ====
AP reporter Ken Ritter wrote that the Nicaragua Apollo 11 Moon Rock "given by then-President Richard Nixon to former Nicaraguan dictator Anastasio Somoza Garcia [had] been pilfered by a Costa Rican mercenary soldier-turned Contra rebel, traded to a Baptist missionary for unknown items, then sold to a Las Vegas casino mogul who displayed them at his Moon Rock Cafe before squirreling them away in a safety deposit box." The Apollo 11 Moon Rock was returned to the people of Nicaragua in November 2012.

== Recovered Moon dust ==
In April 2013, Karen Nelson, an archivist at Lawrence Berkeley National Laboratory, found 20 vials of Moon dust from the Apollo 11 mission with handwritten labels dated "24 July 1970" in a warehouse at the Berkeley lab. They had been there for around 40 years and were forgotten about. NASA requested it be returned to the agency.

== Counterfeit rocks ==
=== Texas ===
On April 23, 2012, at a restaurant in Buffalo, Texas, "Moon Rock Hunter" Joe Gutheinz met with a 67-year-old former toy manufacturer named Rafael Navarro, who claimed to have an Apollo 11 Moon rock given to him by "a maid, now elderly and in failing health, who worked for a Venezuelan diplomat who told people it was a Moon rock". Navarro was offering shavings from the rock for $300,000 on eBay. After looking at the sample through a microscope and later examining documents given him by Navarro, Gutheinz is skeptical of Navarro's claim, stating "...this is a train wreck waiting to happen for him, and he's inviting it. He's opening the jail cell door and walking through it."

=== New York ===
In an October 23, 1999 story entitled "Atlanta Man Admits Trying to Sell Bogus Moon Rock", Reuters reported two brothers, Ronald and Brian Trochelmann, who were previously charged in 1998 in "U.S. District Court in Manhattan…"for…"a scheme to sell a phony moon rock for millions of dollars," both pled guilty to wire fraud, a felony, for perpetrating that scheme. "The brothers claimed that their father had invented a space-food packaging process that was used by the National Aeronautics and Space Administration during the Apollo moon missions of the 1960s. The Trochelmann's alleged that the rock had been brought from the moon by Apollo 12 astronaut Alan Bean and given to John Glenn. They claimed Glenn, the first American to orbit Earth and later a U.S. senator, had given the rock to their father in recognition of his supposed invention." ..." The brothers had negotiated a consignment agreement with Phillips Son & Neale, a Manhattan auction house, to sell the rock in December 1995. However, before the auction took place, the rock was confiscated by FBI agents in December 1995 prior to the scheduled auction." This story first broke in a New York Times Article written by Lawrence Van Gelder on December 2, 1995. At that time NASA expressed the belief that the Moon rock might have been real as it matched the general description of a Moon rock that was stolen in 1970. "Eileen Hawley, a spokeswoman for NASA, said of the sample offered through Phillips & Neale: We have a rock that is classified as lost, an Apollo 12 lunar sample of approximately the same weight. With that information, we need to look at this—that this might be a true lunar sample. Ms. Hawley said a rock sample collected during the Apollo 12 mission had been part of a shipment of registered and certified mail that was stolen while en route to a researcher at the University of California in Los Angeles in 1970. The space agency received a call on Thursday from the Postal Investigative Service in New York, she said, after articles about the impending auction had been published. The service passed along a tip from the retired inspector, who was not identified, about a possible connection between the theft and the rock to be auctioned." This scheme and schemes like it were the inspiration for the undercover sting operation known as Operation Lunar Eclipse, which resulted in the acquisition of the Honduras Goodwill Moon Rock in December 1998.

=== Door-to-door salesman ===
In his November 4, 1969 article appearing in the Fort Scott Tribune entitled "Fake Lunar Rock Racket Feared" NEA Staff correspondent Tom Tiede first predicted a market for fake Moon rocks, a market subsequently given extra momentum as Moon rocks began to be reported lost and stolen. Tiede gave a few examples to support his prediction: "In Miami Florida a housewife had been approached by a door to door salesman dealing in lunar rocks. She bought five dollars worth;" "In Redwood City, Calif., a woman [published an advertisement] announcing Moon dust for sale. At $1.98 an ounce;" "In New York, the Harlem Better Business Bureau [was] cautioning consumers against purchasing any kind of obviously fake moon substances."

=== Dutch Moon rock proven fake ===
In his August 28, 2009 Associated Press story appearing in the Brisbane Times, Toby Sterling recounted how a spokesman for the Dutch National Museum, Amsterdam's Rijksmuseum, acknowledged on August 26, 2009, "that one of its prized possessions, a rock supposedly brought back from the moon by US astronauts, is just a piece of petrified wood." The museum acquired the rock after the death of former prime minister Willem Drees in 1988. Drees received it as a private gift on October 9, 1969 from then-US ambassador J. William Middendorf during a visit by the three Apollo 11 astronauts, part of their 'Giant Leap' goodwill tour after the first moon landing." The museum acknowledged that though they did vet the Moon rock they failed to double check it. The museum was under the incorrect belief that this Moon rock was one of the 135 Apollo 11 Moon rocks that were presented to the nations of the world by the Nixon Administration. "It's a nondescript, pretty-much-worthless stone," said Frank Beunk, a geologist involved in the investigation. The genuine Apollo 11 Moon rock given to the Dutch is in the inventory of a different museum in the Netherlands, which is, in fact, one of the countries where the location of both the Apollo 11 and Apollo 17 gift rocks is known.

== NASA-controlled rocks ==
=== Theft of NASA rocks ===
In June 2002, 101 grams of Moon rocks were stolen from the Johnson Space Center by interns Thad Roberts and Tiffany Fowler. The pair used knowledge of the security around the rocks gained during their internship to remove a 272 kg (600 lb) safe in building 31 North containing the samples. Roberts is a certified pilot and scuba diver who was an ambitious student pursuing degrees in physics, geology, and anthropology who aspired to be an astronaut. Fellow interns Shae Saur and Tiffany Fowler, as well as accomplice Gordon McWhorter were also arrested for their roles in the theft and attempted sale of the rocks. The theft also included a meteorite (ALH 84001) that may have revealed information about life on Mars.

Roberts advertised the rocks on a Belgian mineralogy club website which was forwarded to the FBI who, with the help of Belgian amateur rock collector Axel Emmermann, set up a sting. On July 20, 2002, two FBI agents, posing in an undercover capacity as potential buyers, met with Roberts, McWhorter, and Fowler. All three were arrested, and the samples were recovered. Roberts was also charged with stealing dinosaur bones and other fossils from the University of Utah, which he attended.

The theft was the subject of Ben Mezrich's 2011 book Sex on the Moon: The Amazing Story Behind the Most Audacious Heist in History. Axel Emmermann, Gordon McWhorter, NASA Principal Investigator Dr. Everett Gibson and investigating officers of the FBI and NASA Office of the Inspector General were interviewed on camera for a National Geographic Channels Explorer special called "Million Dollar Moon Rock Heist", first broadcast in the US on March 4, 2012. Testimony given therein is at odds with some of the key claims made in the account by Mezrich, who did not interview the investigating agents.

=== National Air and Space Museum ===
In an Aviation Week & Space Technology article published on September 27, 1976, entitled "Lunar Sample Damaged by Vandals" the author addresses a vandalism and possible theft attempt against a 40 gram Apollo 17 Moon rock. The author states that the "Apollo 17 lunar sample on open display at the Smithsonian Institution's National Air and Space Museum was slightly damaged…during an apparent vandalism attempt. It is possible that theft was the object of the attack on the sample, but both museum and National Aeronautics and Space Administration officials believe vandalism was the primary objective. About two cubic millimeters of the triangular fine-grained basalt were chipped away during the incident that involved a hard blow to the sample with a sharp object. NASA believes no part of the sample was obtained by the vandal. The area around the sample's display case was swept immediately after the incident, and the sweeper bag is now at the Johnson Space Center, where it is being sifted in an attempt to obtain the missing material."

The author stated that "The 40-gram sample on display is the first touchable moon rock. Museum visitors are able to feel directly the texture of the lunar material, a departure from strict NASA policy that dictates that no individual ever handle lunar samples directly as a guard against contamination."

=== Memphis, Tennessee ===
In an August 8, 1986 article written by United Press International entitled "Police Look for Stolen Moon Rocks" the author wrote: "Memphis police are looking for some moon rocks taken from a NASA van that was stolen." The van was assigned to Louis Marshall of Memphis, who conducts education programs for the National Aeronautics and Space Administration. The van was stolen from outside his home Tuesday night, driven to a field and set afire, police said Friday. A space suit in the van was left to burn. But thieves took some lunar rock and soil specimens, police said. Marshall said it was hard to put a value on them. "It's stuff that belongs to all of us. I'm out of business right now," Marshall said. NASA officials said that out of 384 kilograms (847 lb) of Moon rock retrieved through the years, the sample was not a big loss. "I don't know what value it would be except just to gloat over it personally," said NASA spokesman Terry White about the theft. White said theft is not a common problem with the NASA exhibits, which are shown to schools around the country. "I'd always thought, 'Who's going to mess with a big red van with NASA on it?'" Marshall said. There is no indication that this theft was related to a Moon rock theft that followed just a few days later in Louisiana.

=== Louisiana Science and Nature Center ===
A set of six fragments of Moon rocks used in educational programs were stolen from the Louisiana Science and Nature Center by ripping a small safe out of a wall in 1986. The case remains unsolved.

=== Virginia Beach ===
On January 10, 2006, Rudo Kashiri, an education specialist employed by NASA, reported that someone broke into a van that was parked in the driveway of her home in Virginia Beach, Virginia, and made off with a collection of NASA Moon rocks. The rocks were in a safe that was bolted to the van. The safe may or may not have been properly locked. As an Education Specialist for NASA, Kashiri's job involved bringing the Moon rocks to schools and showing them to students. These Moon rocks have not been recovered.

== See also ==
- Apollo 11 lunar sample display
- Apollo 17 lunar sample display
- List of Apollo lunar sample displays
- List of individual rocks
- Joseph Gutheinz
