= Purl (disambiguation) =

Purl or wormwood ale is a drink.

Purl or PURL may also refer to:

== Computing ==
- Persistent uniform resource locator, a URL used to redirect to the location of the requested web resource
- Personalized Uniform Resource Locator, in the Domain Name System

== Other uses ==
- Prioritised Ukraine Requirements List, a mechanism to deliver urgently needed equipment from US stockpiles to Ukraine
- Linda Purl (born 1955), American actress
- Purl stitch (knitting)
- Purl (film), a 2019 animated short by Pixar Animation Studios
- Purl, a character in the children's animated television series Bitz & Bob

== See also ==
- Pearl (disambiguation)
- Perl (disambiguation)
- Perle (disambiguation)
- Perles (disambiguation)
