= Perel (surname) =

Perel is a surname. Notable people with the surname include:

- David Perel (born 1985), South African racing driver
- Esther Perel, American psychotherapist
- Solomon Perel, Israeli author and motivational speaker

== See also ==
- Perelman
- Perlman
