= Pearlman =

Pearlman (Hebrew: פרלמן) is a surname. It is typically an Anglicized version of the Ashkenazi Jewish surname Perelman. Notable people with the surname include:

- Al Pearlman, Democratic member of Philadelphia City Council
- Alan R. Pearlman, American engineer and entrepreneur, founder of ARP Instruments, Inc.
- Adam Pearlman (soccer) (born 2005), Canadian soccer player
- Adam Pearlman, the birth name of Adam Yahiye Gadahn, American member of Al Qaeda
- Audrey Lee Pearlman, known as Yvette Dugay (1932–1986), American actress
- Ed Pearlman, American co-founder of the National Off-Road Racing Association
- Edith Pearlman (1936–2022), American writer
- Henry Pearlman (1895–1974), American businessman and collector
- Jeff Pearlman, American writer, best known for his work on sports
- Jeffrey Pearlman (born 1966), American attorney and politician
- Jillian Pearlman, fictional character in the DC Comics Universe
- Jordan Walker-Pearlman, American film director, screenwriter and producer
- Karen Pearlman, film scholar
- Lindsey Pearlman (1978–2022), American actress
- Lou Pearlman, American record producer and fraudster
- Mahla Pearlman (1937–2011), Australian lawyer and chief judge
- Martin Pearlman (1945–2022), American music director
- Michael Pearlman, American actor and writer
- Moshe Pearlman (1911–1986), born Maurice Pearlman, Israeli writer
- Nathaniel Pearlman (born 1965), American entrepreneur
- Oz Pearlman (born 1982), American mentalist, magician, and athlete
- Valerie Pearlman (1936–2025), British judge
- Red Pearlman (1898–1985), American football player
- Rhonda Pearlman, fictional character on the HBO drama The Wire
- Richard Pearlman, American theater and opera director
- Robert Pearlman (born 1976), American space historian
- Robert E. Pearlman (1939–2021), American explorer, graphic designer, author and publisher
- Sandy Pearlman, American music producer, songwriter, and record company executive
- Stephen Pearlman (1935–1998), American actor
- Steve Pearlman, Canadian television producer and director
- Yaakov Pearlman, Chief Rabbi of Ireland
- Zack Pearlman (born 1988), American actor

== See also ==
- Perlman
- Perelman
