= Perle =

Perle may refer to:

== People ==
- Perle Bouge (born 1977), French paralympic rower
- Perle Fine (1905–1988), American painter
- Perle Mesta (1882–1975), American socialite, political hostess, and former ambassador to Luxembourg
- Perle Morroni (born 1997), French footballer
- Altangerel Perle (born 1945), Mongolian paleontologist
- Christopher Perle (born 1974), Mauritian former footballer
- John Perle (died 1402), MP for Dorchester and Dorset
- John Perle (died 1429), MP for Shrewsbury
- George Perle (1915–2009), American music composer and theorist
- Liz Perle (1956–2015), American publishing executive, writer, and editor
- Richard Perle (born 1941), American political advisor and former government official
- Rūdolfs Pērle (1875–1917), Latvian painter

== Fictional characters ==
- Perle, in Sailor Moon Super S: The Movie
- Bernard Perle, title character of Run Away Mr. Perle, a French 1955 comedy film

== Other uses ==
- Perlé, a town in Luxembourg
- Perle Systems, a serial-to-ethernet, fiber-to-ethernet and device networking hardware manufacturer
- Perle (grape), a German wine grape
- French ship Perle, various French Navy ships and submarines
- Perle (album), a 2004 album by Gianna Nannini

== See also ==
- La Perle (disambiguation)
- Perl (disambiguation)
- Pearl (disambiguation)
- Perles (disambiguation)
- Perlemann
- Perelman
