= Perlman =

Perlman or Perlmann is an Ashkenazi Jewish surname. Notable people with the surname include:

- Alfred E. Perlman (1902–1983), railroad executive
- Anita Perlman, see B'nai B'rith Girls
- Eliezer Yitzhak Perlman, birth name of Eliezer Ben-Yehuda (1858–1922), a Jewish Litvak lexicographer, the driving spirit behind the revival of the Hebrew language in the modern era.
- Elio Perlman, the protagonist of André Aciman's novel Call Me by Your Name
- Elliot Perlman (born 1964), author and barrister
- Fredy Perlman (1934–1985), anarchist author, publisher, and activist
- Gertrude Perlmann (1912–1974), Austro-Hungarian Empire-born American biochemist and biologist
- Isadore Perlman (1915–1991), American chemist
- Itzhak Perlman (born 1945), Israeli-American violinist, conductor, and pedagogue
- Janet Perlman (born 1954), Canadian animator and children's book author and illustrator
- Nathan David Perlman (1887–1952), lawyer and politician
- Philip B. Perlman (1890–1960), United States Solicitor General and Maryland Secretary of State
- Radia Perlman (born 1951), software designer and network engineer
- Ralph Perlman (1917–2013), Louisiana state budget director, 1967–1988
- Rhea Perlman (born 1948), actress
- Ron Perlman (born 1950), actor
- Selig Perlman (1888–1959), economist and labor historian
- Stanley Perlman, American microbiologist
- Steve Perlman (entrepreneur), entrepreneur and inventor
- Suzanne Perlman (1922–2020), Hungarian-Dutch visual artist
- Thomas Perlmann (born 1959), Swedish professor

== See also ==
- Perelman
- Pearlman
- Perls, Perles
