= Pearl (disambiguation) =

A pearl is a hard object produced by mollusks.

Pearl may also refer to:

== People ==
- Pearl (given name), including a list of people and fictional characters with the given name or nickname
- Pearl (surname), including a list of people with the surname
- Pearl (drag queen) (Matthew James Lent, born 1990)
- Pearl (singer) (Jinju, born 1980), South Korean singer
- Hannah Pearl Davis (born 1996), or simply Pearl, Internet personality

== Arts, entertainment and media ==
=== Fictional entities ===
- The Pearl, a fictional skyscraper in Skyscraper (2018 film)
- The Pearl, a research station of the DHARMA Initiative in the TV series Lost

=== Film ===
- Pearl (2016 film), an American animated drama short film
- Pearl (2020 film), an American drama film
- Pearl (2022 film), an American slasher film
- The Pearl (film) (La perla), a 1947 adaptation of Steinbeck's novella

=== Literature ===
- Pearl (literary magazine), 1974–2014
- Pearl (poem), a 14th-century Middle English work
- Pearl, a 2023 novel by Siân Hughes
- The Pearl (magazine), a pornographic publication 1879–1880
- The Pearl (novella), by John Steinbeck, 1947

=== Music ===
- The Pearls, a musical group

==== Albums ====
- Pearl (Heather Nova album), 2019
- Pearl (Janis Joplin album), 1971
- Pearl (soundtrack), from the 2022 film
- Pearls (Elkie Brooks album), 1981
- Pearls, a 1997 album by BZN
- Pearls, a 1995 album by David Sanborn
- Pearls, a 2007 album by Ronnie Drew
- The Pearl (album), by Harold Budd and Brian Eno, 1984

==== Songs ====
- "Pearl", a 1991 song by Chapterhouse from Whirlpool
- "Pearl", a 2010 song by Katy Perry from Teenage Dream
- "Pearl", a 1969 song by Stevie Wonder from My Cherie Amour
- "Pearl", a 1970 song by Tommy Roe
- "Pearl", a 2005 song by Björk from her soundtrack album Drawing Restraint 9
- "Pearls", a 1992 song by Sade from Love Deluxe
- "The Pearl", a 2000 song by Emmylou Harris from Red Dirt Girl
- "The Pearl", a 1999 song by Fleming and John from The Way We Are
- "A Pearl", a 2018 song by Mitski from Be the Cowboy

=== Television ===
- Pearl (miniseries), a 1978 TV series about the attack on Pearl Harbor
- Pearl (TV series), a 1996–1997 sitcom
- "The Pearl", an episode of She-Ra: Princess of Power
- TVB Pearl, a Hong Kong television channel

=== Other uses in arts, entertainment and media ===
- La Perla (Raphael), c. 1518 painting
- Pearl (cultural festival), of BITS Pilani Hyderabad Campus
- Pearl (radio play), by John Arden, 1978
- Pokémon Pearl, a video game
- Pearl Award, an award of the Faith-centered Music Association

== Businesses and organizations ==
- Pearl.com, an online paid question-and-answer service
- Pearl Art and Craft Supply, a former chain of art supply stores
- Pearl Brewing Company, a former American brewery
- Pearl Drums, a Japanese musical instrument manufacturer
- Pearl Group, now Standard Life, a British insurance service provider
- Partnership for Enhancing Agriculture in Rwanda through Linkages (PEARL)
- People for Equality and Relief in Lanka (PEARL), a human rights group
- Polar Environment Atmospheric Research Laboratory (PEARL), a laboratory in Nunavut, Canada

== Places ==
=== United States ===
- Pearl, Colorado
- Pearl Harbor, Hawaii (nicknamed, "Pearl")
- Pearl, Illinois
- Pearl, Kansas
- Pearl, Michigan
- Pearl, Mississippi
- Pearl, Missouri
- Pearl, Texas
- The Pearl (Charlotte), a district in Charlotte, North Carolina
- Pearl District, Portland, Oregon
- Pearl, U.S. Virgin Islands

=== Elsewhere ===
- Pearl, Ontario, Canada
- Pearl Islands, Panama
- Pearl Rocks, Antarctica
- The Pearl Island, an artificial island in Qatar

== Science and technology ==
- PEARL (programming language)
- BlackBerry Pearl, a smartphone
- E Ink Pearl, an electronic paper technology
- Pearl, a printing press made by Golding & Company

== Other uses ==
- List of ships named Pearl
- Pearl (color)
- Pearl (typography), a traditional point-size name
- Pearl/Arts District station, in Dallas, Texas, US
- The Pearl, an 1867 US Supreme Court case
- The Pearl (Edmonton), a residential tower in Canada
- The Pearl (horse), 1871 winner of the Melbourne Cup

== See also ==
- Pearl Diver (disambiguation)
- Pearl necklace (disambiguation)
- Pearl River (disambiguation)
- Perl (disambiguation)
- Purl (disambiguation)
  - Purl stitch, in knitting
- Black Pearl (disambiguation)
- The White Pearl (disambiguation)
- Paarl, a town in South Africa
- Perlan (Icelandic, 'Pearl'), a building in Reykjavík
- Pearl barley, barley processed to remove its hull and bran
- Pearl Index, for reporting the effectiveness of a birth control method
- Pearl onion, or button onion, baby onion or silverskin onion
- Tapioca pearl
