= The Jewel of St Petersburg =

Novel by Kate Furnivall

First edition (publ. Sphere Books)

The Jewel of St Petersburg is a 2010 prequel to The Russian Concubine and The Concubine's Secret by Kate Furnivall. It is about Lydia Ivanova Friss's parents Valentina Ivanova and Jens Friss love, set against the backdrop of Russia.

== Plot ==
Valentina Ivanova was the daughter of the finance minister to Tsar Nicholas II and an aspiring pianist. She wanted to become a nurse after her younger sister Katya was paralysed from a Bolshevik's bomb. Her father wanted her to marry a Russian Count. Jens Friss was a Danish engineer who came to Russia. He became the lover of a married Countess but later saw Valentina performing at a party and later had an affair with her and fell in love. One of Valentina's father's servants was actually a Bolshevik leader.

== Characters ==
- Jens Friis : Lydia's father, a Danish engineer who was lover of Nataile Serova and husband of Valentina.
- Valentina Ivanova : Lydia's mother, daughter of Nicholai Inanov who eloped with Jens
- Katya Ivanova : Valentina's younger sister who became paralysed after a bomb
- Viktor Arkin: a chauffeur to the Ivanov's and a Bolshevik leader
- Captain Stepan Chernov: Valentina's fiancee
- General Nicholai Ivanov: a finance minister and general and Valentina's father
- Elizaveta Ivanova : Valentina's and Katya's mother
- Varenka Sidorova : a mother of three whose husband was a Bolshevik
- Countess Nataile Serova: an infamous countess, lover of Jens.
- Maria: Natile's niece
- Nadaia: one of Valentina's maids
- Aleksanda: one of Valentina's maids
- Liev Popkov: Valentina's friend and Cossack
- Simeon Popkove: Liev's Cossack father
- Mikhail Sergeyev: Viktor's friend, and a Bolshevik
- Andrei Davidov: A friend and coworker of Jens
