= List of ships named Pearl =

Many ships have been named Pearl including:

- The Pearl, a schooner in the Pearl incident, an 1848 slave escape attempt
- MS Pearl, a cruise ship built in 1967
- MS Pearl Seaways, a cruiseferry operated by DFDS Seaways (Seaways' Pearl cruise-ferry)
- Norwegian Pearl, a Norwegian Cruise Lines cruise ship built in 2006
- X-Press Pearl, an X-Press Feeders containership that sank off Sri Lanka in 2021
- HMS Pearl, the name of several Royal Navy ships
- USS Pearl, the name of more than one United States Navy ship

== See also ==
- Pearl (disambiguation)
- Black Pearl (Pirates of the Caribbean), a fictional ship
- Pearl-class corvette
- Pearl-class cruiser
