= The Russian Concubine =

2007 novel by Kate Furnivall

- First edition
- Author: Kate Furnivall
- Genre: Historical fiction
- Published: 2007
- Publisher: Sphere Books
- Publication place: United Kingdom
- Pages: 517
- ISBN: 978-0-425-21558-6
- OCLC: 77494512
- Followed by: The Concubine's Secret

The Russian Concubine is a 2007 novel by Kate Furnivall. The book is loosely based on the story of Furnivall's mother Lily, who was a Russian refugee. Set in Russia and China, it is a love story between Lydia Ivanova and Chang An Lo and is followed by a sequel The Concubine's Secret and a prequel The Jewel of St Petersburg, which is about Lydia's parents Valentina and Jens.

== Plot ==
The story begins in 1917 when a five-year-old Lydia Ivanova Friis and her Russian mother Valentina Ivanova escape from Russia during the Bolshevik Revolution after her Danish father Jens Friis was arrested by the police, they are later reunited fleeing the Bolsheviks, where it is then believed that Jens was killed at their hands. Eleven years later in 1928, Junchow, China, Lydia is sixteen and works as a thief with the help of Mr Liu, a pawnbroker, to support her mother. During one of Lydia's escapades where she finds herself in trouble, she is saved by a Chinese teenager named Chang An Lo. An Lo is a freedom fighter and a Communist rebel. He eventually becomes romantically involved with Lydia after she saves his life when he defends her honour. They begin to face trouble when Lydia is kidnapped and tortured by a member of the Black Snakes, who happens to hold a grudge against Chang An Lo. She is later rescued by Alexei Serov, who happens to be her half-brother.

== Characters ==
- Lydia Ivanova Friis: A 16-year-old red-headed girl who was born to a Danish father and Russian mother who was exiled from Russia. At age of 5 her father Jens was captured by Russians and taken away, causing her mother Valentina to become an alcoholic. Lydia supports her mother by stealing from people. She also studies at the Willoughby Academy. She has a pet rabbit named after Sun Yat Sen, a gift from an admirer of her mother's. She discovers that Alexei is her half-brother after her mother's death and is rescued from the Black Snakes. Lydia and her half-brother go to Russia to find their father
- Chang An Lo: A 19-year-old English-educated Chinese youth who is a kung fu master. He saves Lydia twice. Orphaned at a young age, he was raised by an uncle after his family were executed by the Chinese and was taught English by an American after his uncle died. He considers Lydia to be his 'fox girl' because of her red hair. He was beaten by the Black Snakes and nursed by Lydia. After saving Lydia's life Chang was arrested by the police for the murder of Feng Pu Chan
- Feng Li Mei: Daughter of the Black Snakes leader Feng Tu Hong and Theo's lover whom Li Mei nicknames Tiyo. Later she accepts his proposal of marriage.
- Theo Willoughby: Is a British man with an addiction to opium. He was orphaned at nine years old. He also runs his own school Willoughby Academy, where he is Lydia's teacher.
- Valentina Ivanova Friis Parker : Lydia's mother who is a pianist. She later became an alcoholic after her Danish husband was taken by the Russians 11 years previously. She believes her husband had an affair with Countess Serova. Later she is killed with a hand grenade by a Chinese woman who was aiming for Theo Willoughby and happened to be in the wrong place at the wrong time, leaving her daughter to be raised by Alfred Parker whom she married.
- Polly Mason: Lydia's friend and Christopher Mason's daughter who revealed to her father that Chang is still alive and apologized to Lydia for what she did.
- Feng Tu Hong: Li Mei's estranged father who is the leader of the Black Snakes and later accepted Theo as his son in law.
- Alfred Parker: Lydia's stepfather who is a journalist for the Daily Herald and a friend of Theo Willoughby, who falls in love with Valentina. He later marries her and helps her recover from drinking. He tries to be a father figure to Lydia, even though she stole his wallet and pocket watch. She doesn't like him to begin with, but in the end both he and Lydia have a good relationship after he becomes a widower following Valentina's death.
- Christopher Mason: Polly's father who is a ruthless man who sells opium. He is later arrested by police. He was also in relationship/arrangement with Valentina.
- Countess Natalie Serova: An infamous Countess from Russia who is insulted by Lydia's lack of Russian. She is also considered to be an enemy of Valentina. Jens Friis turns out to be the father of her son Alexei.
- Live Popkov: Lydia's godfather and friend of Jens and Valentina. He later tells Lydia that Jens is still alive and like Lydia he is working as a thief.
- Antoine Fourget: A Married Frenchman and one of Valentina's lovers who gave flowers to Lydia on her 16th birthday, though Valentina refused to see him.
- Sir Edward Carlisle: a member of Ulysees club.
- Tan Wah: Chang An Lo's blood brother who was killed by the Black Snakes in front of Lydia.
- Yuen Dun: Chang An Lo's cousin.
- Jens Friis: Lydia and Alexei's father - a Danish Engineer who was kidnapped by the Russians.
- Dong Po: A police woman from Chang An Lo's past.
- Anthea Mason: Christopher's wife and Polly's mother.
- Pu Chan : Li Mei's brother and Tu Hong's son. A member of the Black Snakes who was poisoned by Chang An Lo. He kidnapped Lydia who later kills him
- Mr Liu: A pawnbroker whom Lydia worked for as a thief. Later he is beaten by the Black Snakes.
- Sebastian and Constance Yeoman: A couple who lived next door to Lydia and her mother.
- Yuesheng : A man who worked with Chang An Lo. He was later killed by police.
- Kuam : A woman who worked with Chang An Lo.
- Alexei Serov : Countess Natalie's son, who visited Valentina and tried to woo Lydia. He later saved Lydia from the Black Snakes after she was kidnapped. He later discovers he is her half-brother.
- Mrs Zarya : Lydia's landlady whose husband is an officer.
