= Kate Furnivall =

British historical novelist

Kate Furnivall is a British historical novelist who is well known for the debut novel, The Russian Concubine.

== Early life ==
Furnivall was born to an English father and White Russian mother. She grew up with a twin sister, an older brother and a sister, with the four children raised in Penarth, a small seaside town in Wales, United Kingdom (UK).

Furnivall's mother's own childhood was spent in Russia, China, and India, and it was her mother who inspired Furnivall to write.

== Career ==
Furnivall's first novel, The Russian Concubine, is based on her mother's life and was written following the latter's death in 2000 (a request to document Furnivall's mother's life came from the author's family in the wake of the passing). Furnivall has cited the origins of her writing career in the prolific oeuvre of her husband, also an author, who has written under the pseudonym, "Neville Steed".

The author's books are published by Sphere, an imprint of the English publishing company, Little Brown.

== Personal life ==
Furnivall attended London University and worked in advertising where she met her future husband, Norman. Furnivall has two sons and currently lives with her husband in Devon.

== Works ==
- The Russian Concubine (2007)

Under a Blood Red Sky (2008)

- The Red Scarf (2008) (Published as Under a Blood Red Sky in the UK)
- The Girl from Junchow (2009) (Published as The Concubine's Secret in the UK)
- The Jewel of St Petersburg (2010)
- The White Pearl (2011)
- Shadows on the Nile (2012)
- Diamonds in the Dust (2012)

The Far Side of the Sun (2013) The Italian Wife (2014) The Liberation (2016)
