= Perl (disambiguation) =

Perl is an open-source computer programming language.

Perl may also refer to:

- Perl 6, the previous name of Raku, an open-source programming language related to Perl
- Perl, Saarland, a municipality in Saarland, Germany
- Perl (given name)
- Perl (surname)

== See also ==
- Pearl (disambiguation)
- Perle (disambiguation)
- Perles (disambiguation)
- Perls
- Purl (disambiguation)
