= The White Pearl =

The White Pearl may refer to:

- The White Pearl (film), a 1915 American silent film
- The White Pearl (novel), a 2011 novel by Kate Furnivall
- development name of sailing yacht A
