= French ship Perle =

A number of ships and submarines of the French Navy have borne the name Perle ("pearl").

== Ships ==
- Perle (1663), a 34-gun ship of the line, ex-Tric captured from the navy of Algiers
- Perle (1673), a galley
- Perle (1675), a 5th-rank ship of the line, ex-Dauphin or Dauphin de Bayonne
- Perle (1682), a galley
- Perle (1690), a 54-gun ship of the line
- Perle (1694), a Fleur de Lis-class galley
- Perle (1725), a Perle-class galley
- Perle (1745), a 12-gun corvette
- Perle (1746), a 32-gun frigate
- French ship Perle (1768), a Rossignol-class corvette
- Perle (1790), a frigate later captured and commissioned in the Royal Navy as HMS Amethyst
- Perle (1813), a 44-gun frigate
- Perle (1829), a 20-gun corvette
- Perle (1831), a 46-gun frigate, ex-Pérola captured from the Portuguese during the Battle of the Tagus
- Perle (1860), a Calédonienne-class schooner
- Perle (1875), a Calédonienne-class schooner
- French submarine Perle (1903), a Naïade-class submarine launched in 1903 and stricken in 1914
- French submarine Perle (1935), a Saphir-class submarine launched in 1935 and sunk in 1944
- French submarine Perle (S606), a Rubis-class submarine launched in 1990

== See also ==
- Perle de Londres (1696), a 6-gun fluyt
- HMS Pearl
- USS Pearl
