= Robert E. Pearlman =

American graphic designer, advertising executive, explorer, and author (1939–2021)

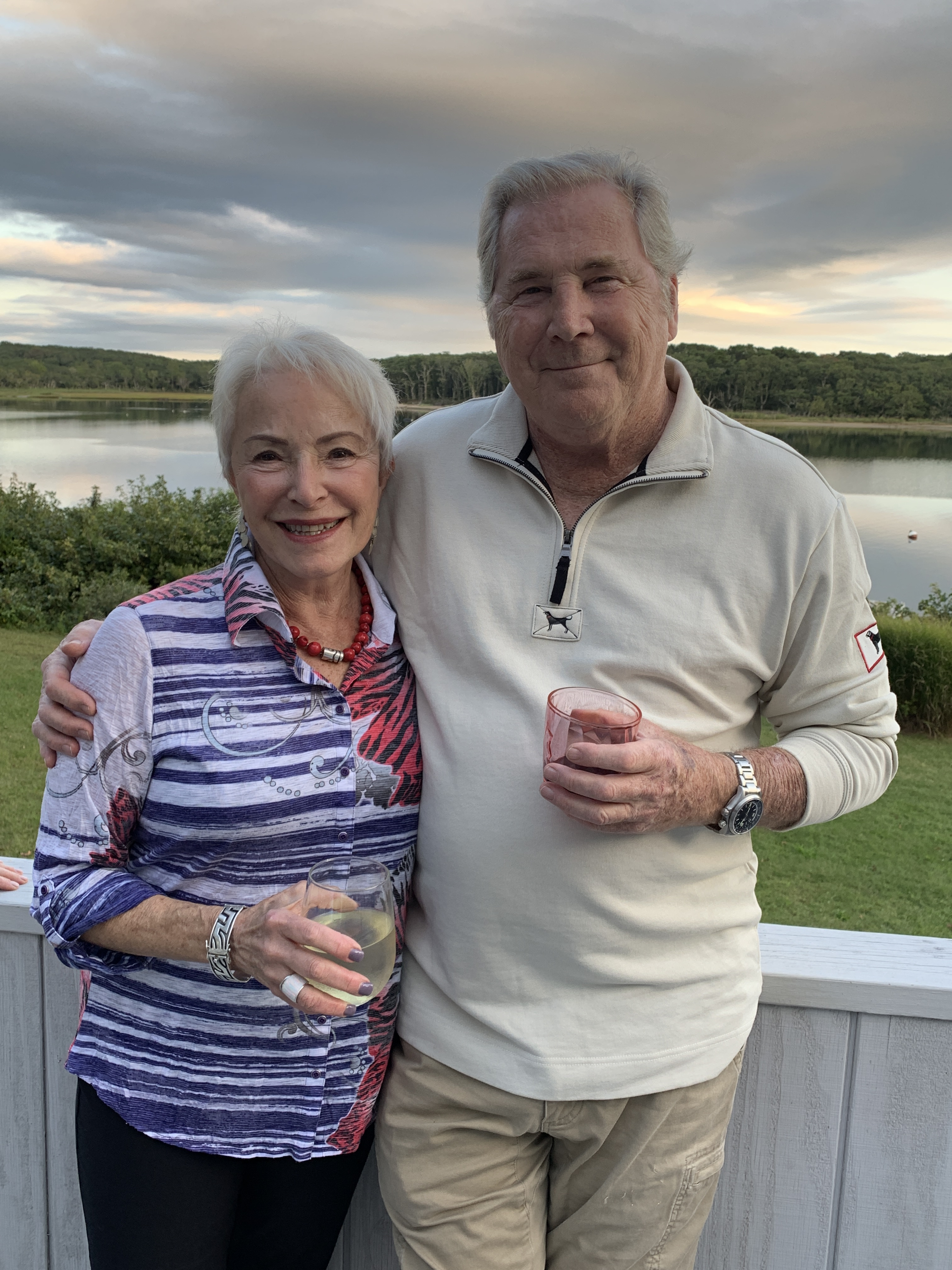
- L to R: Karol L. Rose, Robert E. Pearlman
- Born: September 16, 1939; Boothwyn, Pennsylvania, U.S.
- Died: February 11, 2021 (aged 81)
- Occupations: graphic designer, advertising executive, explorer, and author
- Years active: 1957-2021
- Known for: Research and exploration with the Maasai
- Notable work: The Maasai Mara Expeditions

Robert Eugene Pearlman (September 16, 1939 – February 11, 2021) was an American explorer, graphic designer, writer and publisher. He was primarily known for his work with the Maasai people of Kenya, where he conducted several cultural outreach expeditions in the late 20th and early 21st century. He was a board member of The Explorers Club and a 1998 recipient of the club's Sweeney Medal.

== Biography ==
Pearlman was born on September 16, 1939, in Boothwyn, Pennsylvania. He graduated high school in 1957 in Carmel, New York.

In 1970 Pearlman collaborated with his first wife Ruth (née Himelfarb) on a cookbook for homemade infant food. Ruth Pearlman (later Ruth Sember; she and Pearlman divorced in 1975) received her doctorate from Columbia University and went on to a career as a physicist and later a financial advisor before her death in June 2014. Their son Scott A. Pearlman, also a member of the Explorers Club, died in 1997; the Scott Pearlman Field Awards of the club are named in his honor.

Pearlman's early career included work as a medical illustrator and as a documentary filmmaker for LIFE magazine. After moving to Italy in the late 1960s (to go scuba diving), he returned to New York City in the early 1970s and was a founding partner of the Cavalieri Kleier Pearlman advertising agency.

Pearlman's second marriage to the former Gail Ash also ended in divorce. His third wife Karol Rose is the author of several books on work-life effectiveness and employee benefit programs.

Pearlman served as the director of marketing communications for Hadassah before his retirement. He was a past director of the Charles A. and Anne Morrow Lindbergh Foundation.

Pearlman lived on Martha's Vineyard, Massachusetts, and in San Miguel de Allende, Mexico. He died of complications from lung cancer in San Miguel on February 11, 2021.

=== Expeditions ===
In 1973, Pearlman embarked on his first solo expedition to Kenya, learning the Maa language and living with the Maasai. This initial contact later grew into the Maasai Mara Expeditions.

In 1984, he received a Lindbergh Foundation grant for intercultural communications for a project titled "Learning How the Maasai See". The Maasai Mara Expeditions, organized and led by Mr. Pearlman in 1981-85, were a flag expedition of The Explorer's Club. Parts of the expedition were filmed by British television for inclusion in a 13-part series titled Village Earth, which aired on ITV in April 1983. The Maasai segment was later aired in the United States on the Discovery Channel.

In 1989-91, Pearlman worked as a USAID consultant for the government of Botswana, and from 1984 to 1989, he was a member of Yale University's Council Committee for the Peabody Museum of Natural History. He also coordinated the 1981 youth essay contest at The Planetary Society's Planetfest '81 celebration; 25 essay winners joined Carl Sagan, Ray Bradbury, Gene Roddenberry and more to witness the Voyager encounter with Saturn at the Jet Propulsion Laboratory. He produced pro bono marketing materials for The Cousteau Society for five years, and he was also a member of an Explorers Club sponsored Whale Rescue Expedition to Baja, Mexico, to test equipment for marine mammal strandings.

From 1999 to 2003, he organized and led a series of expeditions to document Floppy/Flaccid Trunk Syndrome, a mysterious disease that causes paralysis in African elephants.

In 2004, Pearlman co-founded (with Charles F. Brush III) the Maasai Oral Histories project, creating field recordings of the Maasai and collaborating with educators to expand awareness of traditional Maa language and culture.

=== Bibliography ===
Feeding Your Baby, the Safe and Healthy Way, co-author, Random House, 1972.

Loews Monte Carlo Casino Guide to Gambling, Monaco, 1975

Yugoslavia: At the center of the cosmos, Town & Country Magazine. July 1979

Maasai Language and Symbols: Keys for Survival, 1981 Rolex Spirit of Enterprise, Page 312

The Last Manyatta, The Explorers Journal, Volume 62, Number 1, 1984, Page 19

The Maasai Mara Expeditions, Communicating with an Endangered Culture, The Journal of the Washington Academy of Sciences, December,1987 Volume 77, Number 4, Page 141.

Botswana: A strategic Investment Opportunity, USAID, 1990

What's Killing the Wild Elephants of Africa, Explorers Journal, Volume 79, Number 2, Page 24

Adventurous Dreams, Adventurous Lives, by Jason Schoonover, 2007. Rocky Mountain Press.

Work/Life Effectiveness, 1983 (as publisher)

The Explorers Journal, 1983–84 (as publisher)

Pearlman is profiled in Jason Schoonover's book Adventurous Dreams, Adventurous Lives.

== Explorers with the same name ==
The founder of the collectSPACE website is also a well-known explorer and Lindbergh Foundation collaborator named Robert Pearlman, but they are not the same person. The space journalist is Robert Zane Pearlman and the Maasai Mara expedition leader was Robert Eugene Pearlman.
