= Baton Rouge station =

- Yazoo and Mississippi Valley Railroad Co. Depot
- U.S. National Register of Historic Places
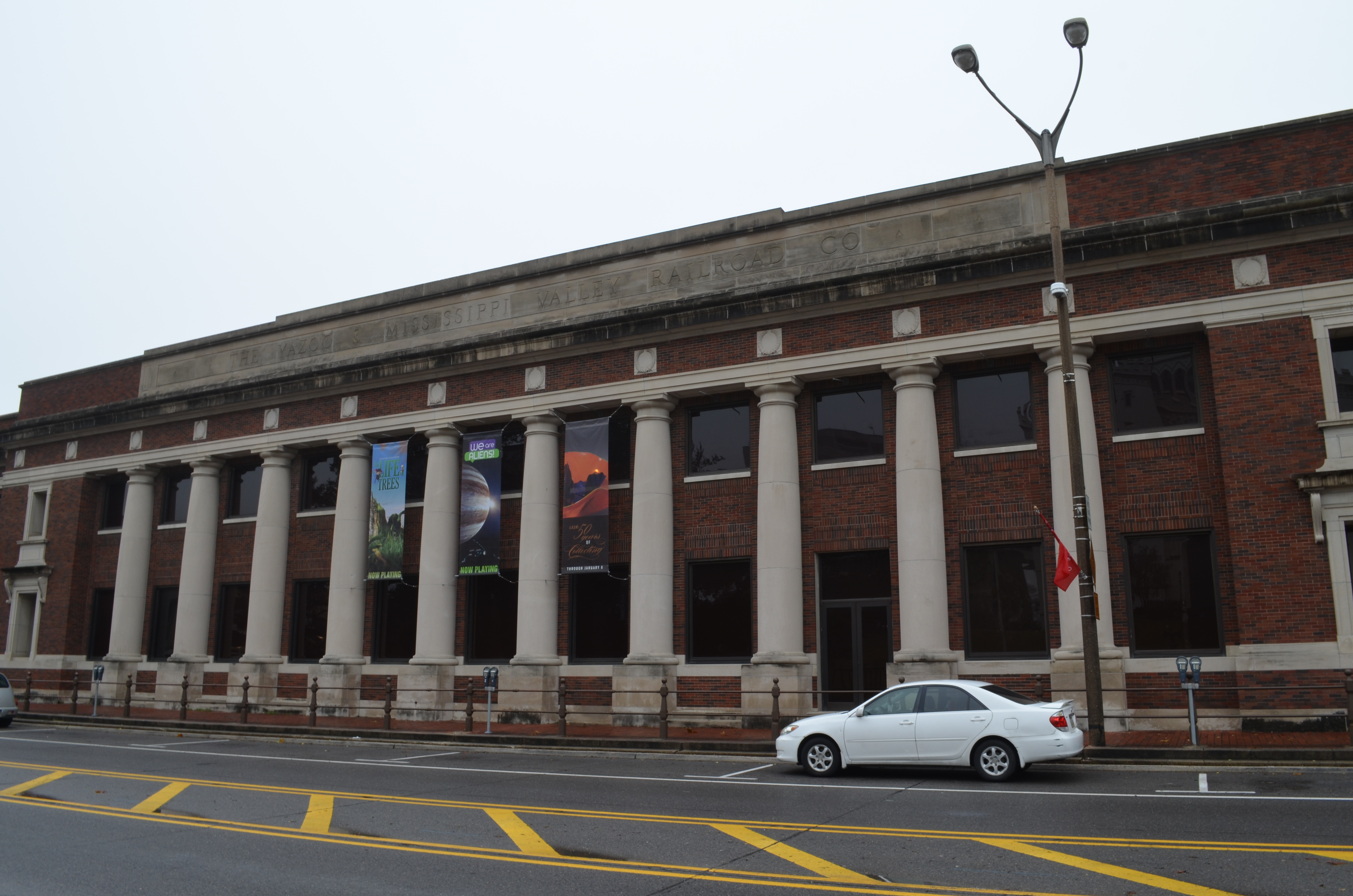

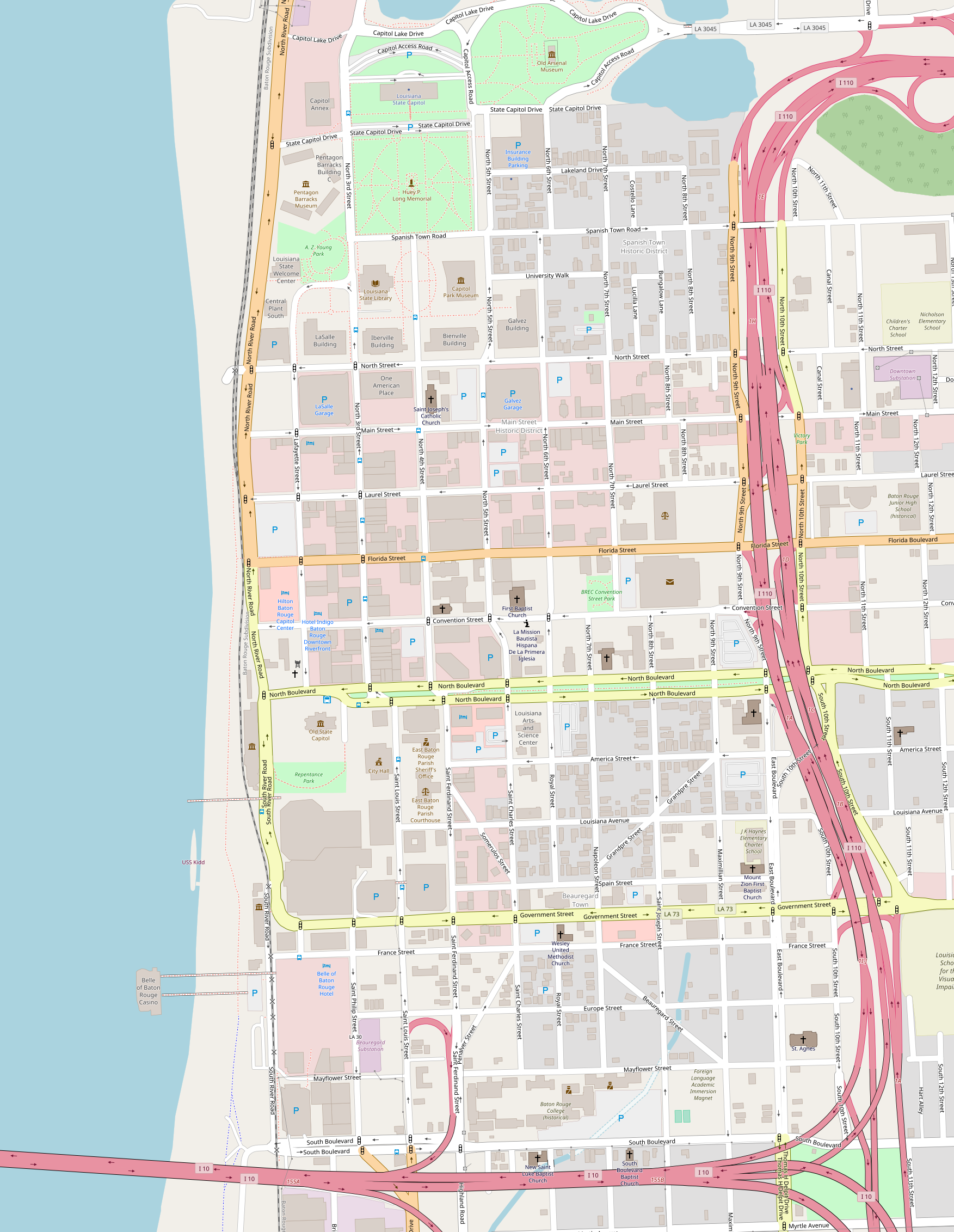
- Location within Baton Rouge Downtown
- Location: 100 South River Road, Baton Rouge, Louisiana
- Coordinates: 30°26′47″N 91°11′25″W
- Area: 2 acres (0.81 ha)
- Built: 1925
- Architectural style: Classical Revival
- Website: www.lasm.org
- NRHP reference No.: 94000463
- Added to NRHP: May 19, 1994

Baton Rouge station is a historic train station located at 100 South River Road in downtown Baton Rouge, Louisiana. It was built for the Yazoo and Mississippi Valley Railroad which got absorbed by the Illinois Central Railroad. The station was a stop on the Y&MV main line between Memphis, Tennessee and New Orleans, Louisiana. The building now houses the Louisiana Art and Science Museum.

The two-story main block and the two one-story wings in Classical Revival style stand directly across the Old State Capitol building.

The building was added to the National Register of Historic Places on May 19, 1994, as the Yazoo and Mississippi Valley Railroad Co. Depot.

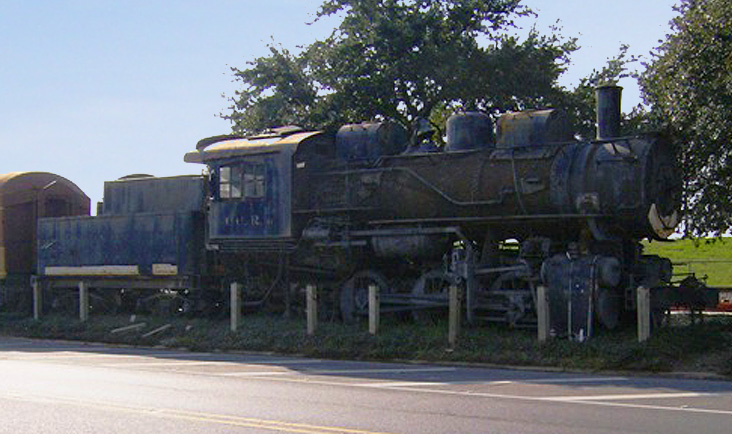
Illinois Central's 333 steam engine at the Yazoo and Mississippi Valley Railroad Company Depot

IC-333, a 0-6-0 steam engine formerly owned by the Charles Black Sand & Gravel Company of Fluker, LA, is on display just outside the building. Several passenger cars previously on display have been removed. As of 2011, IC-333 and its tender have been removed from the site as well.

== Passenger service ==
In 1949 passenger service consisted of the Illinois Central's Planter, an all-coach train from Memphis, Tennessee to New Orleans via Vicksburg, Mississippi (along the Yazoo (main line, rather than the IC main line). The station hosted an additional two trains to and two trains from New Orleans.

In the station's final years of use, it was not used by the Illinois Central but instead by the Missouri Pacific, the unnamed successor to the Houstonian night train on the Houston - New Orleans route. This was not the final train in the city; the Kansas City Southern Railway continued the Southern Belle until 1969 at that company's own station in Baton Rouge.

== Louisiana Art and Science Museum ==
The museum contains many exhibits and galleries, as well as a planetarium.

- An ancient Egyptian mummy from the Ptolemaic dynasty.
- A gallery for the Solar System, including displays on astronomy and meteors. In 2018, the museum was also loaned a Triceratops skull from a private collection, nicknamed Jason.
- Louisiana's Apollo 11 lunar sample display in its stores.

== See also ==
- Yazoo and Mississippi Valley Railroad
- National Register of Historic Places listings in East Baton Rouge Parish, Louisiana
- Delta Blues Museum (former Yazoo and Mississippi Valley Railroad Co. Depot) in Clarksdale, Mississippi

== Footnotes ==
Preceding station	Illinois Central Railroad	Following station
St. Gabriel toward New Orleans	Yazoo and Mississippi Valley Railroad Main Line	North Baton Rouge toward Memphis
Terminus	Baton Rouge – Hammond	Baton Rouge Junction toward Hammond
Preceding station	Missouri Pacific Railroad	Following station
Walls toward Houston	Houston – New Orleans	Gardere toward New Orleans
