= Perelman =

Perelman (Hebrew: פרלמן) is an Ashkenazi Jewish surname. Notable people with the surname include:

- Bob Perelman (b. 1947), American poet
- Chaïm Perelman (1912–1984), Polish-born Belgian philosopher of law
- Deb Perelman, creator of the Smitten Kitchen blog
- Grigori Perelman (b. 1966), Russian mathematician who proved the Poincaré conjecture
- Martín Perelman (born 1986), Argentine footballer
- Mikhail Perelman (1923–2002), Soviet gymnast, winner of Olympic gold medal
- Omer Perelman Striks (b. 1993), Israeli actor
- Raymond G. Perelman (1917–2019), American businessman and philanthropist
- Richard B. Perelman, author of Perelman's Pocket Cyclopedia of Cigars
- Ronald Perelman (b.1943), American banker, businessman, and investor
- S. J. Perelman (1904–1979), American humorist, author, and screenwriter
- Sean Kanan (b. 1966 as Sean Perelman), American actor
- Vadim Perelman (b. 1963), Ukrainian-born Canadian-American film director
- Yakov Perelman (1882–1942), Soviet science-writer and author of popular science-books

== See also ==
- Perl (disambiguation)
- Perle (disambiguation)
- Pearl (surname)
- Perlman
- Pearlman
