= HMS Pearl =

HMS Pearl may refer to the following ships of the Royal Navy:

- English ship Pearl (1651). a Fifth rate of 22 guns of the navy of the Commonwealth of England launched in 1651 and taken into the new Royal Navy in 1660; it was sunk as a foundation (breakwater) at Sheerness in 1697
- HMS Pearl (1673), a former merchant ship purchased as a fireship in 1673 and expended in the same year
- HMS Pearl (1708), a fifth rate of 42 guns launched in 1708; a detachment of its crew under Lieutenant Robert Maynard killed Blackbeard in 1718; broken up in 1722
- HMS Pearl (1726), a fourth rate of 42 guns launched in 1726 and sold in 1744
- HMS Pearl (1744), a fifth rate of 44 guns launched in 1744 and sold in 1759
- HMS Pearl (1762), a fifth rate of 32 guns launched in 1762, renamed Prothee in 1825, and sold in 1832.
- HMS Pearl (1828), a sloop of 20 guns launched in 1828
- HMS Pearl (1855), a Pearl-class corvette of 21 guns launched in 1855
- HMS Pearl (1890), a Pearl-class cruiser launched in 1890 and sold for scrap in 1906

== See also ==
- Pearl (disambiguation), for other ships of this name
