= Perls =

Perls is a surname. Notable people with the surname include:

- Alexander Perls (born 1976), American musician, entrepreneur and record producer
- Frank Perls (1910–1975), German-born American art dealer
- Fritz Perls (1893–1970), German-born psychiatrist and psychotherapist
- Hugo Perls (1886–1977), German art dealer, historian, philosopher
- Klaus Perls (1912–2008), German-American art dealer
- Laura Perls (1905–1990), German-born psychologist and psychotherapist
- Nick Perls (1942–1987), American audio engineer
- Tom Perls (born 1960), American gerontologist

== See also ==
- Perls' Prussian blue, a commonly used method in histology, histopathology and clinical pathology
- Perl (disambiguation)
- Perles (disambiguation)
