= La Perle =

La Perle may refer to:

- La Perle (ballet), by Petipa
- La Perle, Edmonton, a residential neighbourhood in Alberta, Canada
- Laurette la Perle (born 1989), Congolese singer
