= Pearl Diver (disambiguation) =

Pearl Diver (1944–1971) was a French Thoroughbred racehorse that won the Derby in 1947.

Pearl Diver or Pearl Divers may also refer to:

- Pearl diver, one who recovers pearls from wild molluscs.
- Pearl Diver, a 1930 biography of diver Victor Berge (1891–1974)
- The Pearl Diver, a 2004 novel by Sujata Massey
- Pearl Diver, a film that won a 2005 award at the Indy Film Fest
- Sisid (international title Pearl Diver), a Philippine TV drama series
- "Pearl Diver", a song by Mitski from the 2012 album Lush
- Pearl Diver, the name of an LNER Peppercorn Class A2 steam locomotive

== See also ==
- Les pêcheurs de perles ('The Pearl Fishers'), an opera by Bizet
