= Pearl.com =

Non-free online expert-answered Q&A

Pearl.com is an "online paid question-and-answer service" based in San Francisco.

== History ==
Pearl.com was a re-branding of the company JustAnswer, founded in 2003 by Andy Kurtzig. Kurtzig had previously built and sold a company called "Anser" that automated the making of classified advertisements for newspapers.

By about 2012, JustAnswer offered customers a forum for posing questions to lawyers, healthcare professionals, computer technicians, relationship counselors and experts in numerous other fields. By 2014, the company changed its operations to comply with regulations.

== Controversy ==
Regarding providing legal advice for "$30 to $40" and glossing over "details that could more easily emerge face to face" founder Andy Kurtzig conceded that an in-person followup may be needed. He said to The Wall Street Journal his service delivers "key insights that will cut your appointment time from three hours to less than an hour.”

In January 2026, FTC sued JustAnswer for consumer deception. The lawsuit alleged that the company

...deceive[ed] consumers into enrolling in a monthly recurring subscription by claiming that consumers can 'join' JustAnswer and get access to Experts for a nominal fee (either $1 or $5, depending on the advertisement). In reality, consumers cannot join JustAnswer for $1 or $5. After consumers enter their credit card information to pay the nominal 'join' fee, Defendants simultaneously charge them a subscription fee that has ranged between $28 and $125. Defendants then continue to charge the subscription fee every month until the consumer cancels their subscription. While Defendants provide limited information about the required monthly subscription on their website, Defendants do not present it clearly and conspicuously. As a result, hundreds of thousands of consumers have provided their credit card information to Defendants without affirmatively consenting to enroll in an ongoing monthly subscription and pay the monthly fee.

As of February 1, 2026, over 9k customers reported on TrustPilot to have been defrauded by the American branch of JustAnswer and almost 5k by the UK branch.
