= HMS Pearl (1828) =

Royal Navy sloop, in service 1828–1851

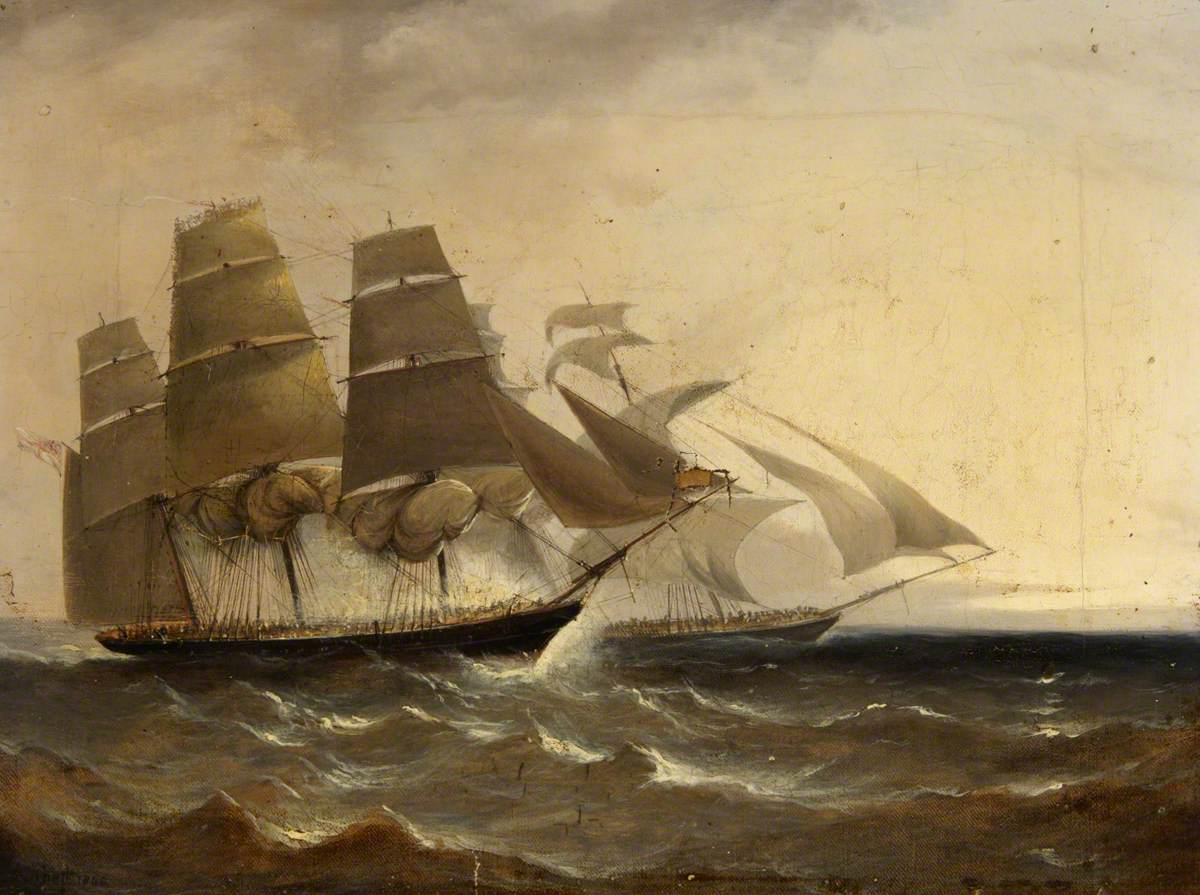
- HMS Pearl capturing the Spanish slaver Opposicao in 1838. 1840 painting by William Adolphus Knell

History

United Kingdom
- Name: HMS Pearl
- Launched: 17 March 1828
- Fate: Broken up, 1851

General characteristics
- Class & type: sloop
- Tons burthen: 558 (bm)
- Propulsion: Sails
- Sail plan: Full-rigged ship
- Armament: 20 guns

HMS Pearl was a 20-gun British Royal Navy sloop. Lord Clarence Paget, then a Commander, was given command of Pearl on 17 January 1837. On 18 April 1838 she captured the Portuguese slave brig Diligente. On 28 April, off the coast of Havana, she captured the Spanish slave schooner Opposicao. She also captured the slave ship Vengador.

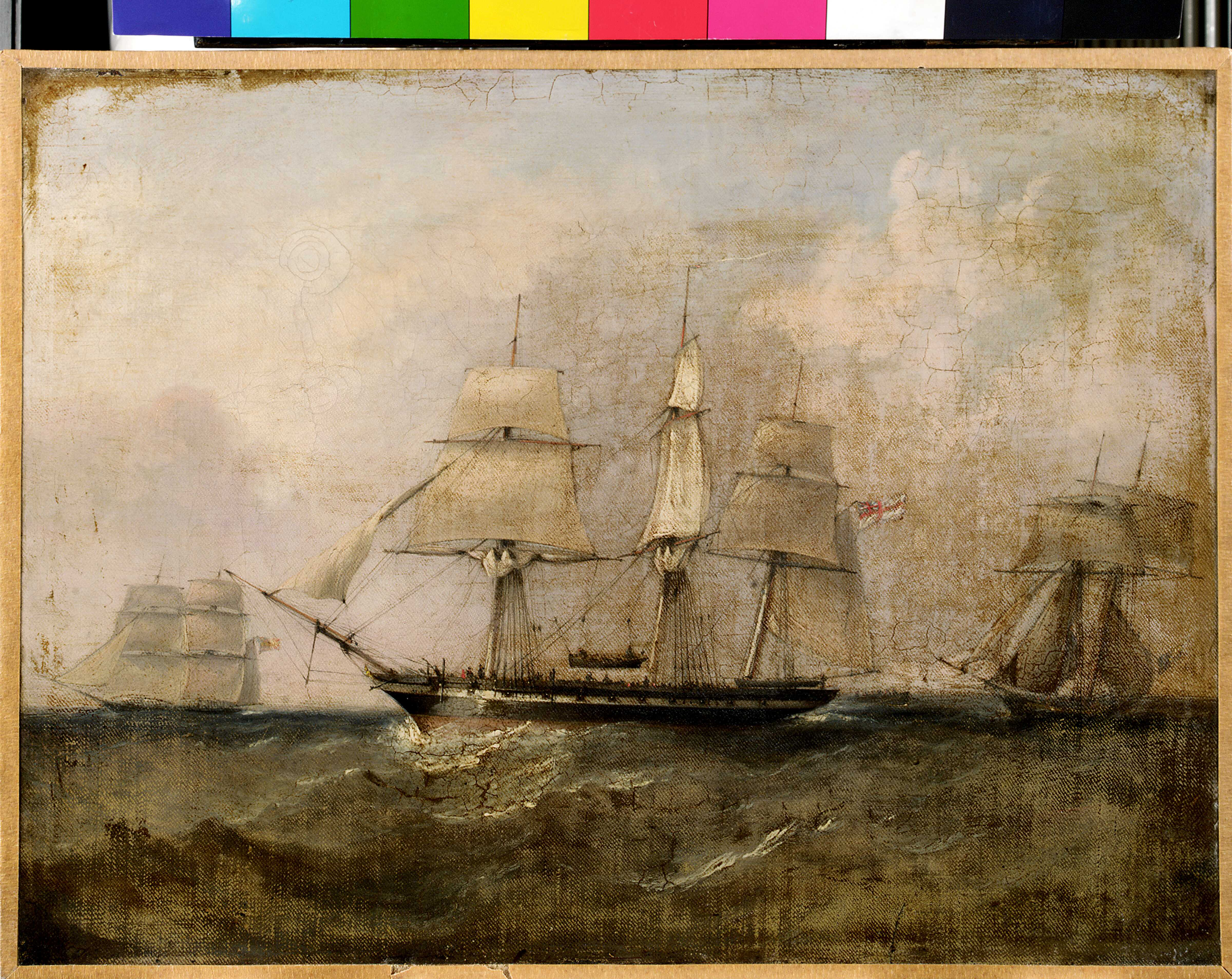
HMS Pearl capturing the Vengador
