= The White Pearl (novel) =

2011 novel by Kate Furnivall

- First edition (UK)
- Author: Kate Furnivall
- Language: English
- Publisher: Sphere Books
- Publication date: 2011
- Pages: 448 ppg
- ISBN: 0425241009

The White Pearl is a 2011 novel by Kate Furnivall set during the Japanese occupation of Malaya in the early 1940s. The White Pearl's initially takes place on a rubber plantation, later moving onto the yacht from which the novel takes its name.

== Plot ==
The novel's main character, Constance "Connie" Hadley, accidentally kills a Malay woman who places a curse upon Hadley and her family several minutes before dying. The killed woman is the mother of teenage twins, Maya and Razak, and Hadley endeavours to meet with the pair after a troubling guilt affects her already fragile marriage to Nigel. Despite her husband's protests, Hadley decides to meet the sixteen-year-old twins, who in turn seek revenge against Hadley, and the brother and sister proceed to instead bond with Hadley's son, Teddy.

It is December 1941 and, following their attack on Pearl Harbor, Japanese forces are seeking to occupy Malaya. The British forces stationed in Malaya are overpowered and the Hadleys are forced to sail to Singapore in their yacht, The White Pearl. Connie subsequently struggles for survival with her family as, along with numerous other passengers the couple have assisted to flee, they seek shelter on an island after Singapore also loses its status as an option for safety.

== Characters ==
- Constance "Connie" Hadley (née Thornton): Wife of a plantation owner whose painful past involved an affair with a

Japanese man, Shohei Takehashi.

- Fitzpayne: A mysterious man whom Connie hires to skipper her yacht The White Pearl and sworn brother of Sho

after he was orphaned at the age of 12.

- Shohei Takehashi: A Japanese spy and Connie's former lover who accidentally falls on his knife in a struggle with Connie.
- Nigel Hadley: Connie's husband and a rubber plantation owner who is fond of Razak.
- Teddy Hadley: Connie's seven-year-old son.
- Morgan Madoc: Main villain who colludes with the Japanese.
- Kitty: Madoc's spunky wife.
- Harriet: Connie's friend who dies after being poisoned.
- Johnnie Blake: Nigel's best friend, and a wounded British war pilot.
- Henry: Harriet's husband.
- Maya: Razak's sister, who holds a grudge against Connie because she accidentally killed her mother with her car.
- Razak: Maya's brother who is treated by Nigel like a son.
- Hakim: Maya's pimp at the "Purple Pussy".
- Chala: Teddy's nanny.
- Japanese Pilot: rescued by folks on the White Pearl, against his will.
- Nurrul: Malaysian sailor who has lost his wife and child, friend of Fitzpayne.
- General Takehashi: Sho's father.

== Reception ==
Reception for The White Pearl has been mostly positive. Kirkus Reviews and the Lytham St Annes Express gave a positive review for the book, with Kirkus calling the book a "ripping yarn". Publishers Weekly wrote that the ending of the book was "somewhat implausible" but that the overall book was "engrossing".
