= Apollo 17 lunar sample display =

Moon rock fragment

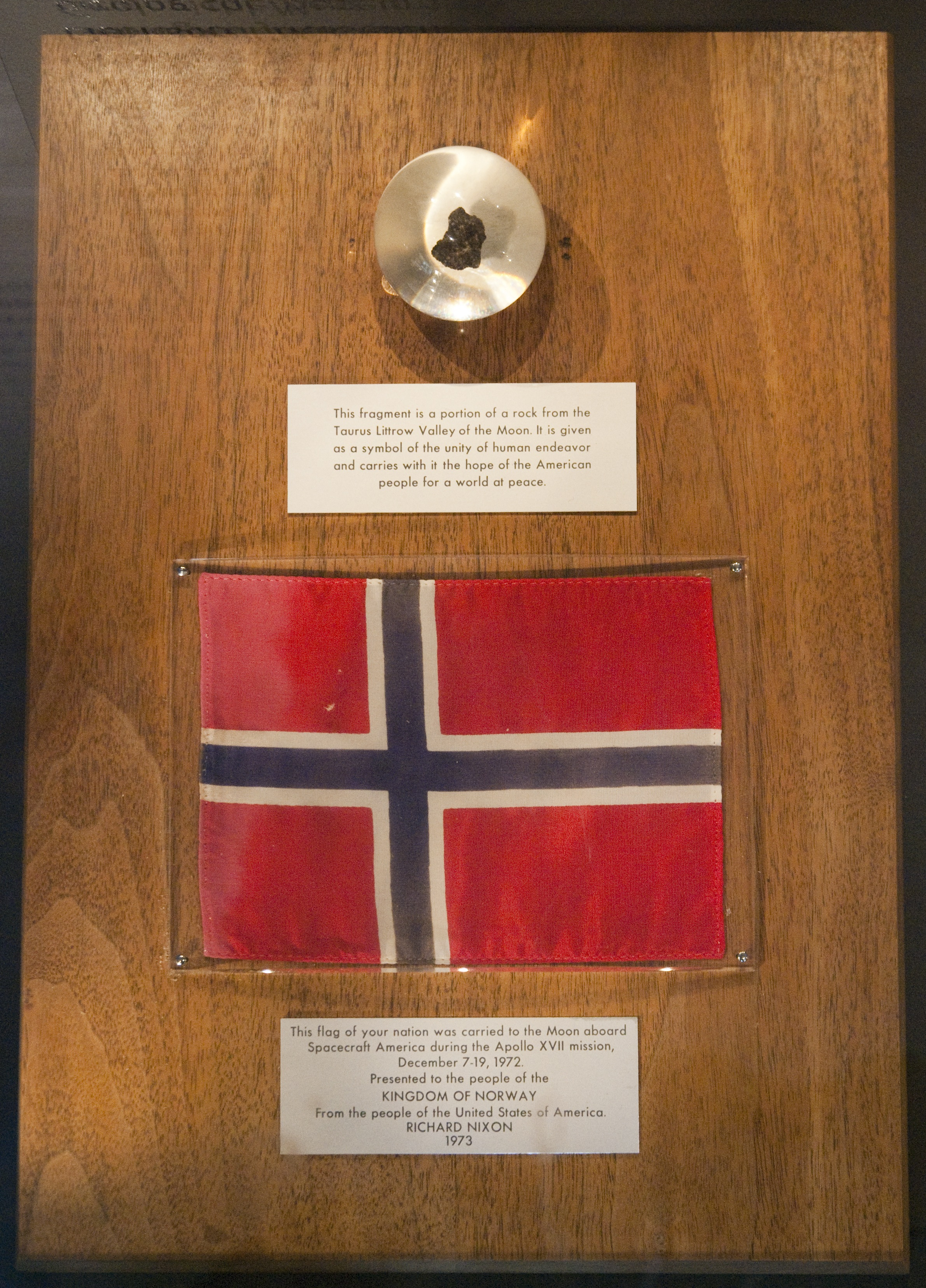
Norway's lunar sample display

The Apollo 17 lunar sample display consists of a Moon rock fragment from a lava Moon stone identified as lunar basalt 70017, the recipient's flag and two small metal plates attached with descriptive messages. A goodwill gift from the Apollo 17 mission was then given by President Richard Nixon in the form of a wooden commemorative plaque display to all fifty U.S. states and U.S. territories, and 135 nations worldwide.

== Collection ==
Eugene Cernan and Harrison Schmitt ended their walk on the Moon in 1972 with a dedication to the young people of Earth and a desire that all "live in peace and harmony in the future". They expressed hope that distribution of pieces of the rock they had collected would bring this worldwide peace and goodwill.

== Description ==
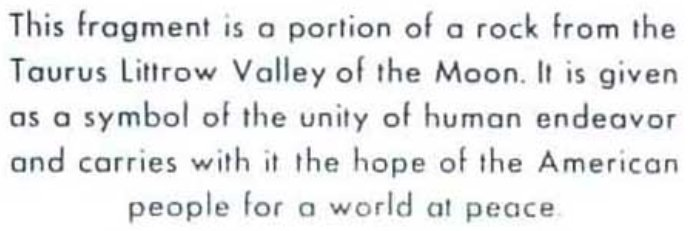
Message on Apollo 17 plaque

The sample Moon rock collected during the Apollo 17 mission was later named lunar basalt 70017, and dubbed the Goodwill rock. Pieces of the rock weighing about 1.14 grams were placed inside a piece of acrylic lucite, and mounted, along with a flag of the country which would receive it, that had flown on Apollo 17.

In 1973 Nixon had the plaques sent to 135 countries, and to the United States with its territories, as a goodwill gesture. They were presented with a letter from Nixon, stating that:

"... as we stretch for the stars, we know that we stand also upon the shoulders of many men of many nations here on our own planet. In the deepest sense our exploration of the moon was truly an international effort.

It is for this reason that, on behalf of the people of the United States I present this flag, which was carried to the moon, to the State, and its fragment of the moon obtained during the final lunar mission of the Apollo program.

If people of many nations can act together to achieve the dreams of humanity in space, then surely we can act together to accomplish humanity's dream of peace here on earth. It was in this spirit that the United States of America went to the moon, and it is in this spirit that we look forward to sharing what we have done and what we have learned with all mankind."

== Fate ==
The New York Times reported in 2012 that gifts of moon rocks were not well tracked or managed by NASA. Within the US, public gifts require legislation to be transferred, but other nations set their own laws. Some samples of lunar dust soil from the earlier Apollo 11 and samples from the Apollo 17 missions have been reported missing. Since 2005 entities and people have made concerted efforts to find the displays. Joseph Gutheinz, a former NASA Office of Inspector General special agent and a professor who teaches an online course at the University of Phoenix, had his students try to locate the displays. Robert Pearlman of collectSPACE has also tracked the displays.

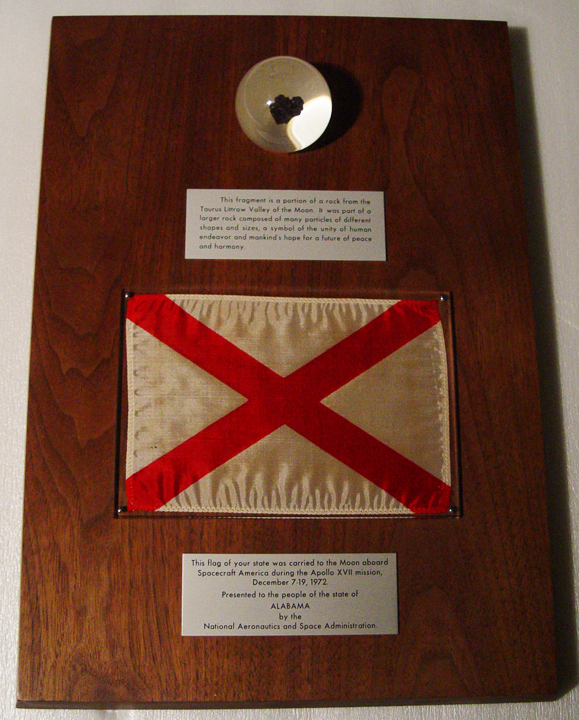
Alabama display

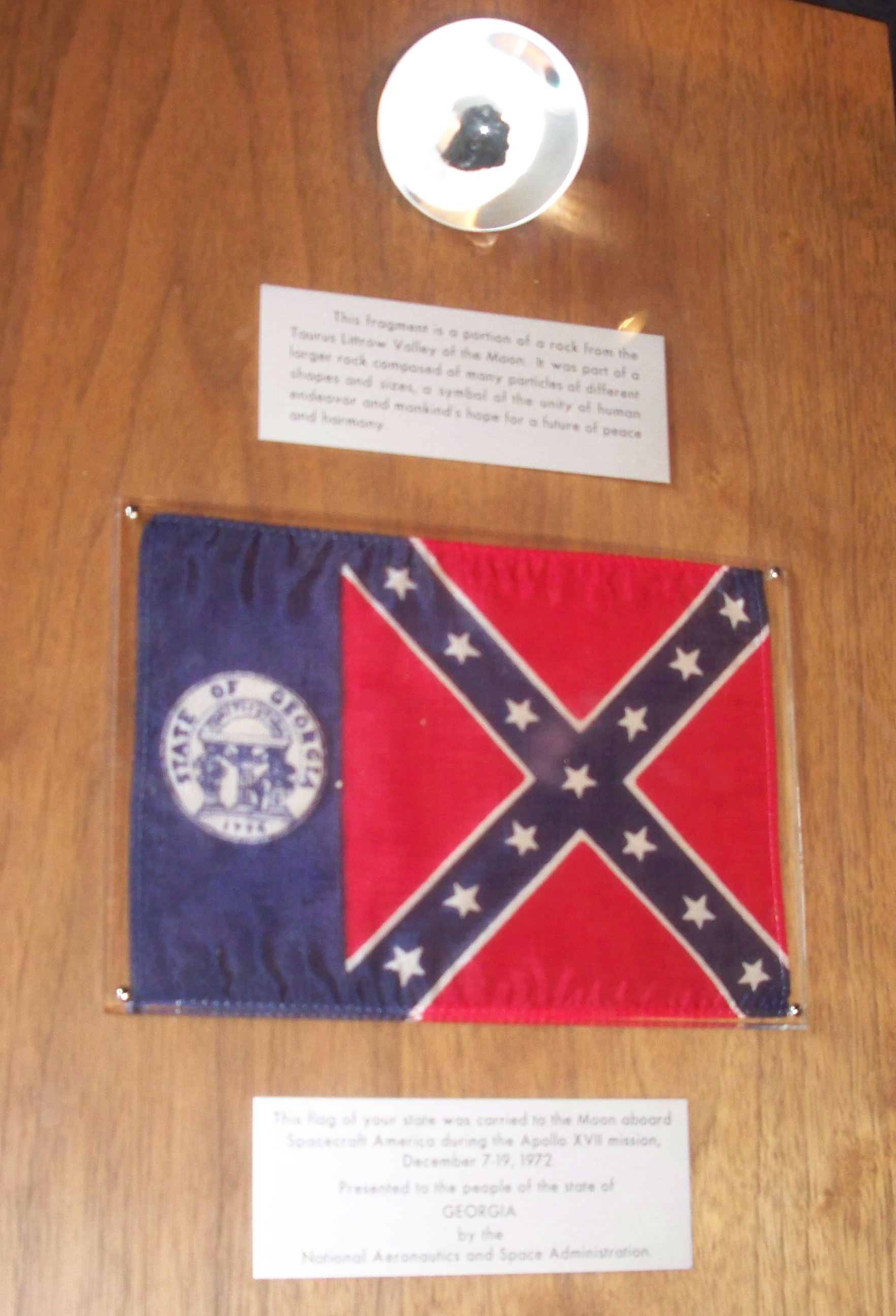
Georgia display

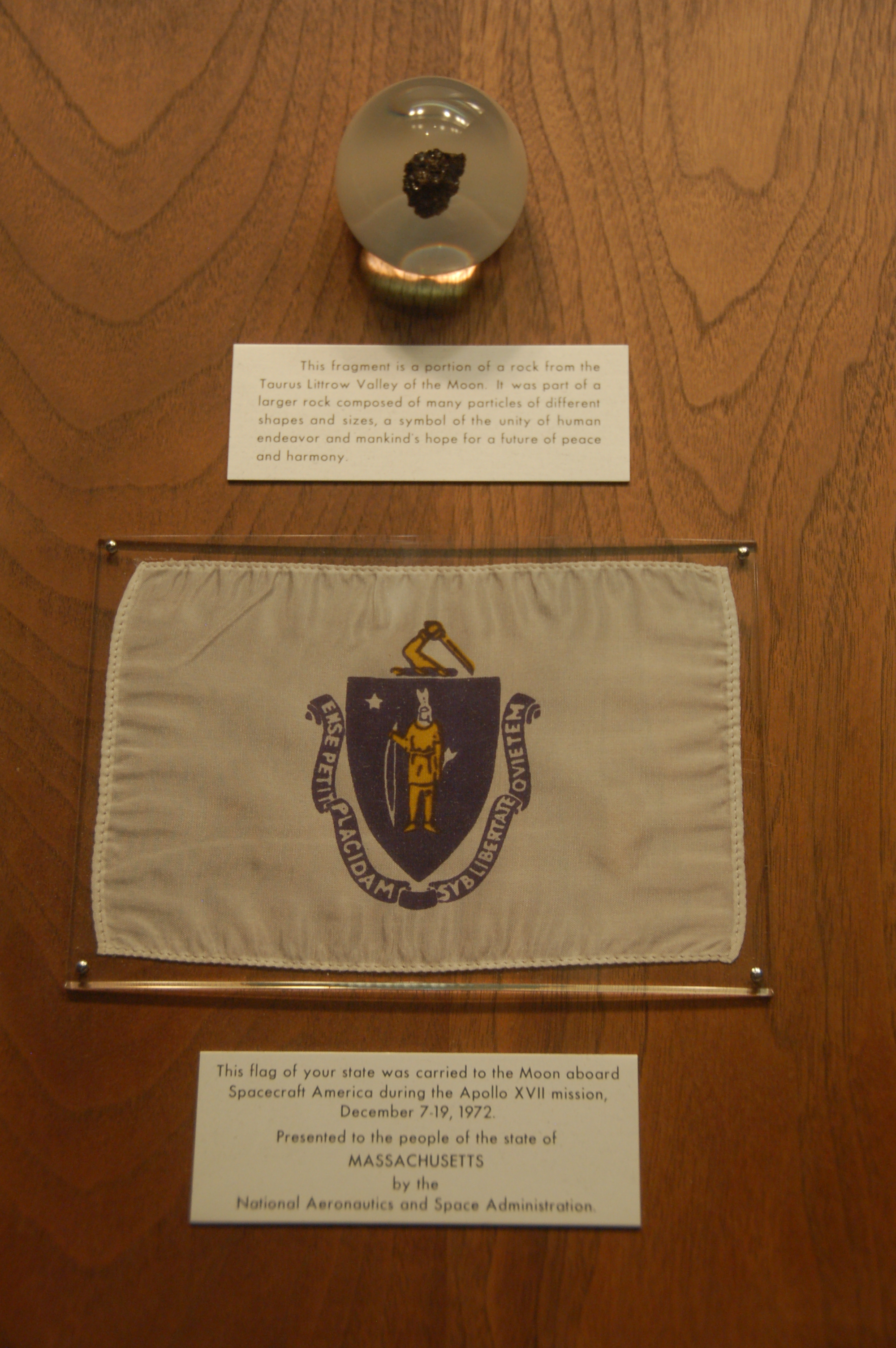
Massachusetts display

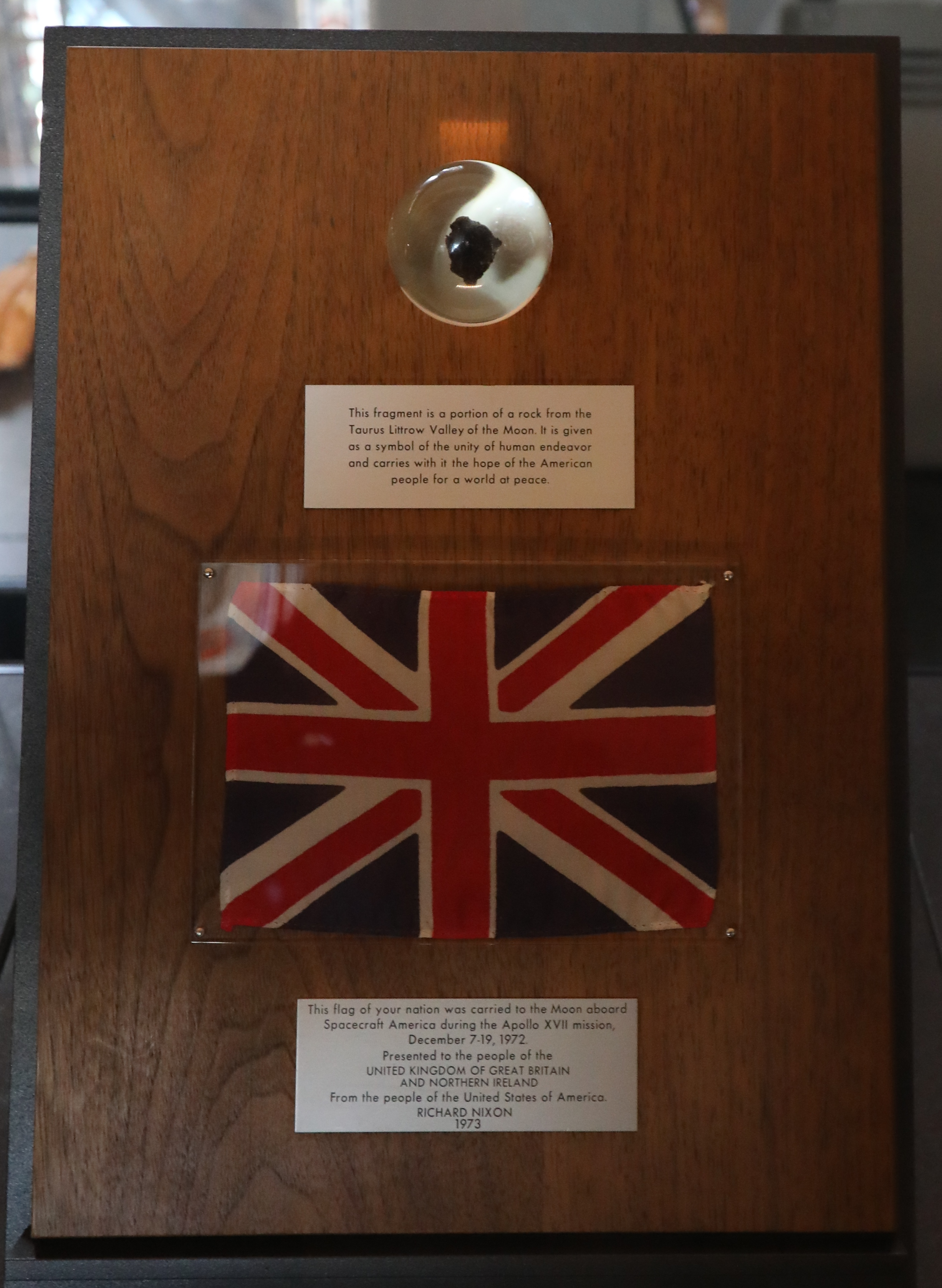
United Kingdom display

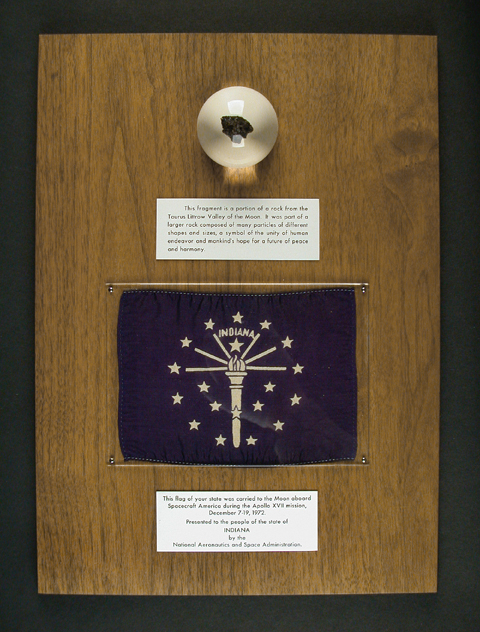
Indiana display

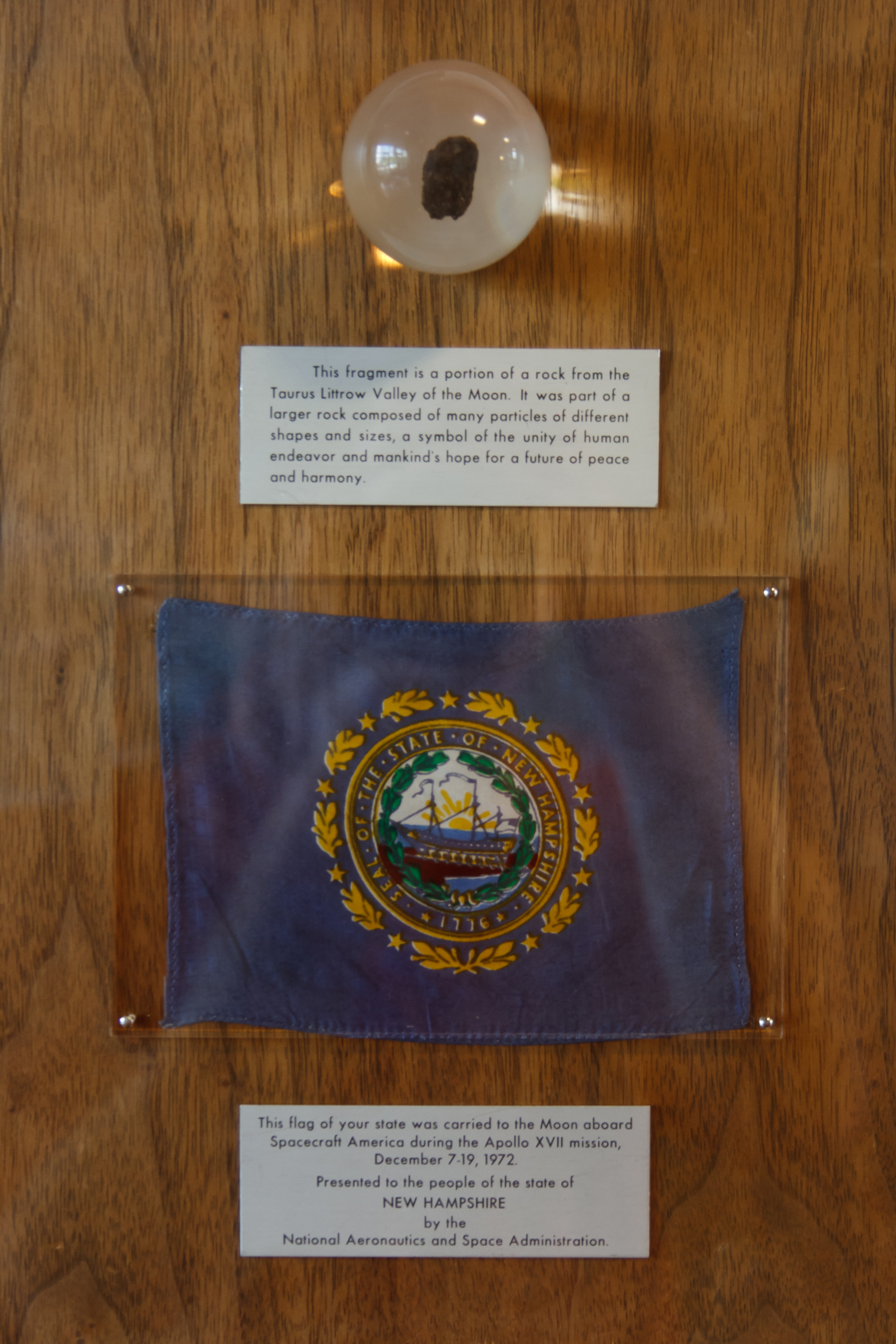
New Hampshire display

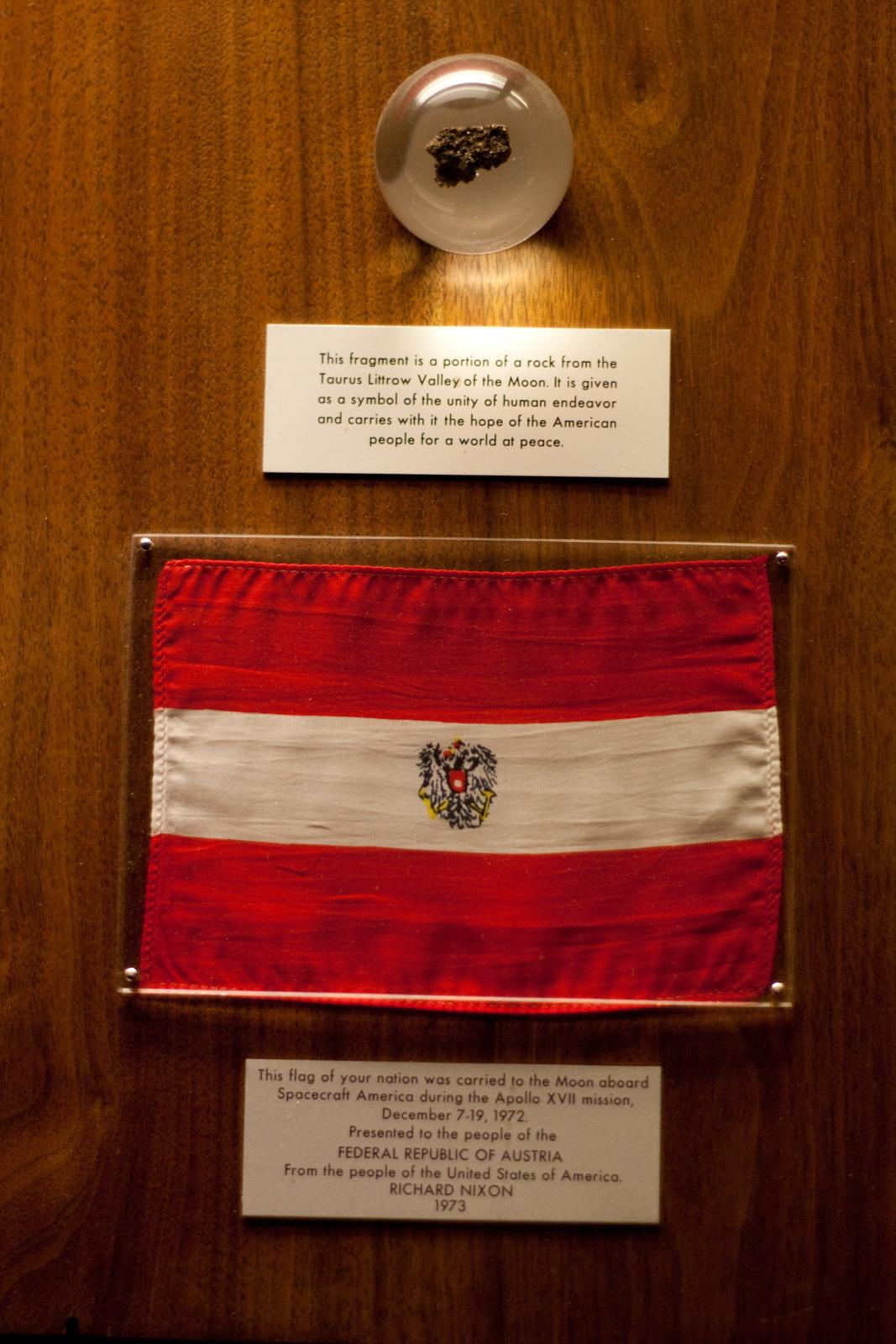
Austria display

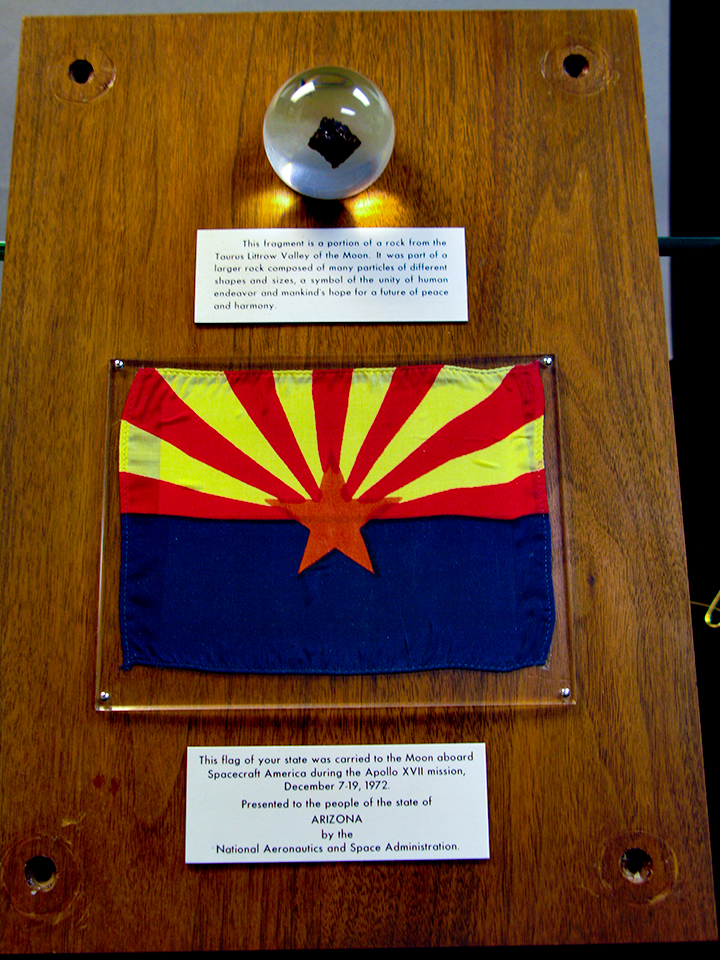
Arizona display

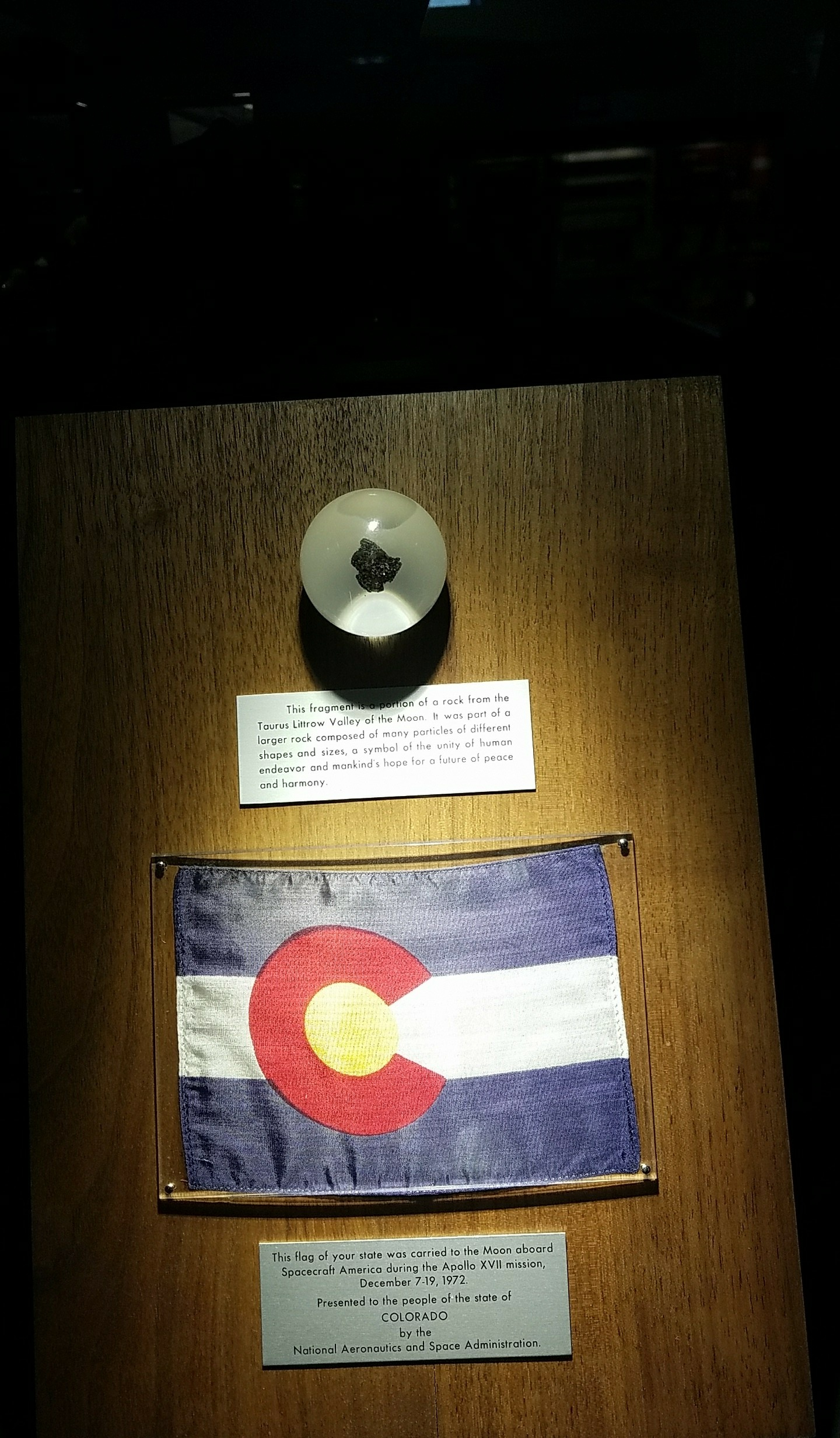
Colorado display

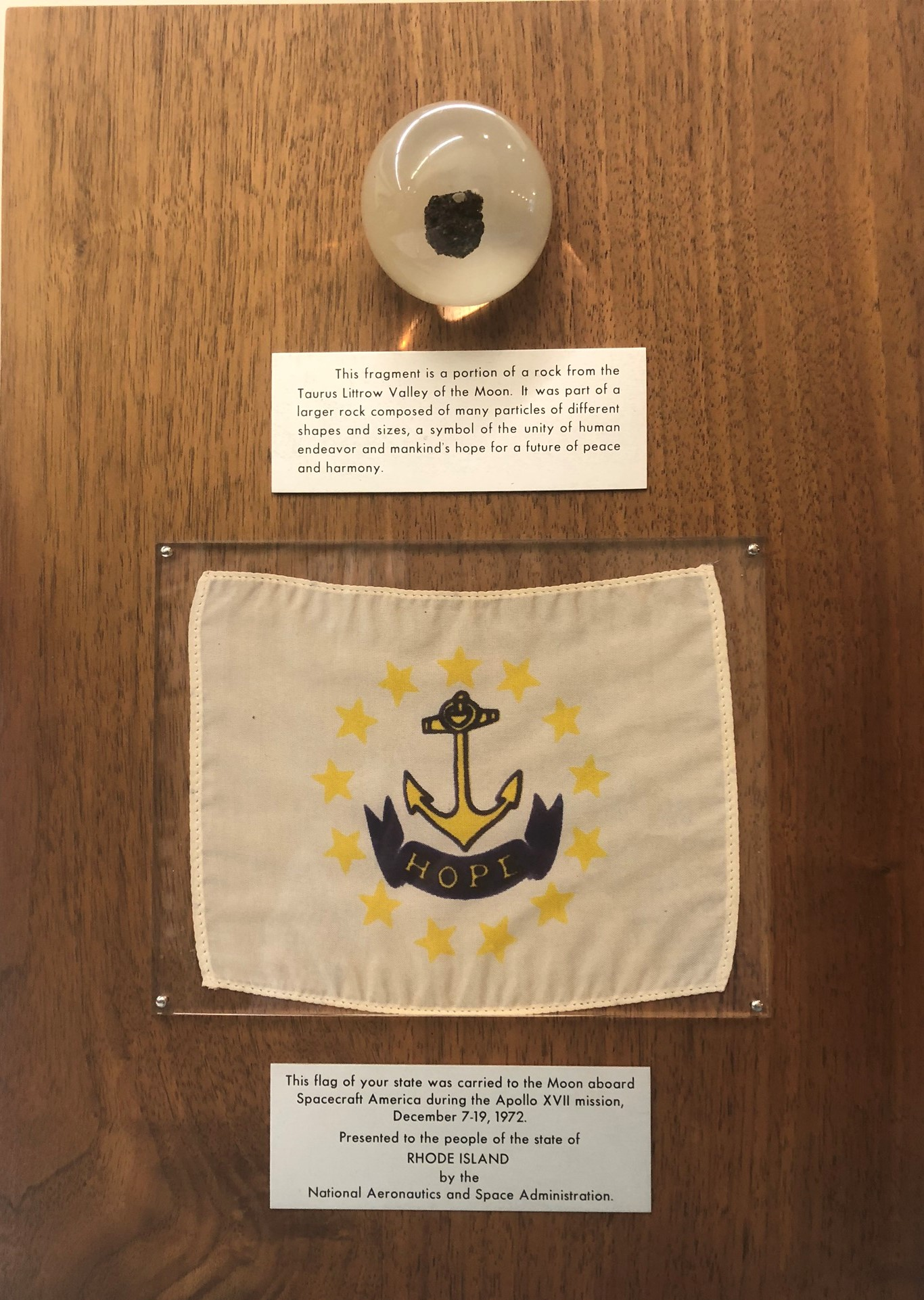
Rhode Island display

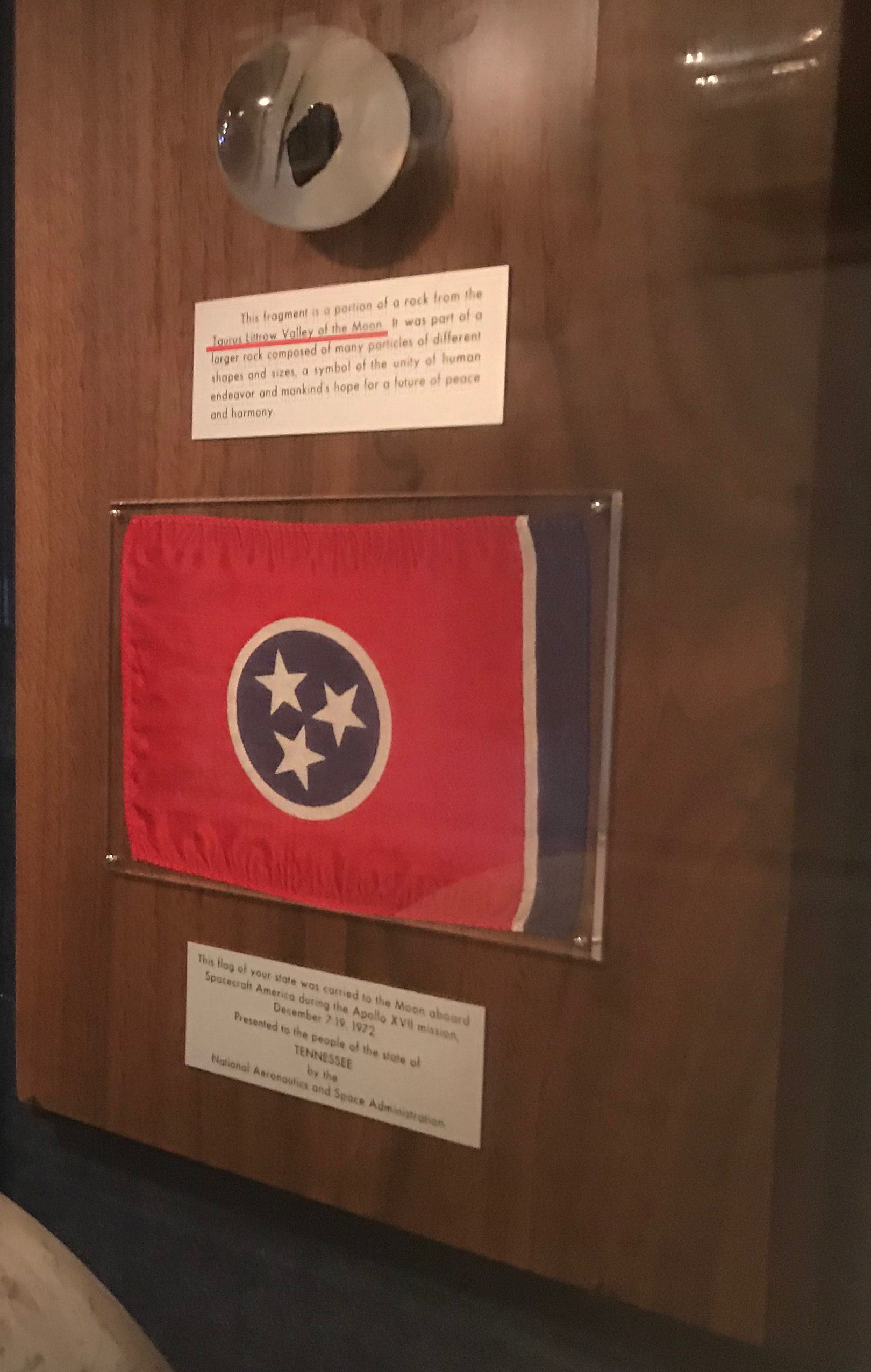
Tennessee display

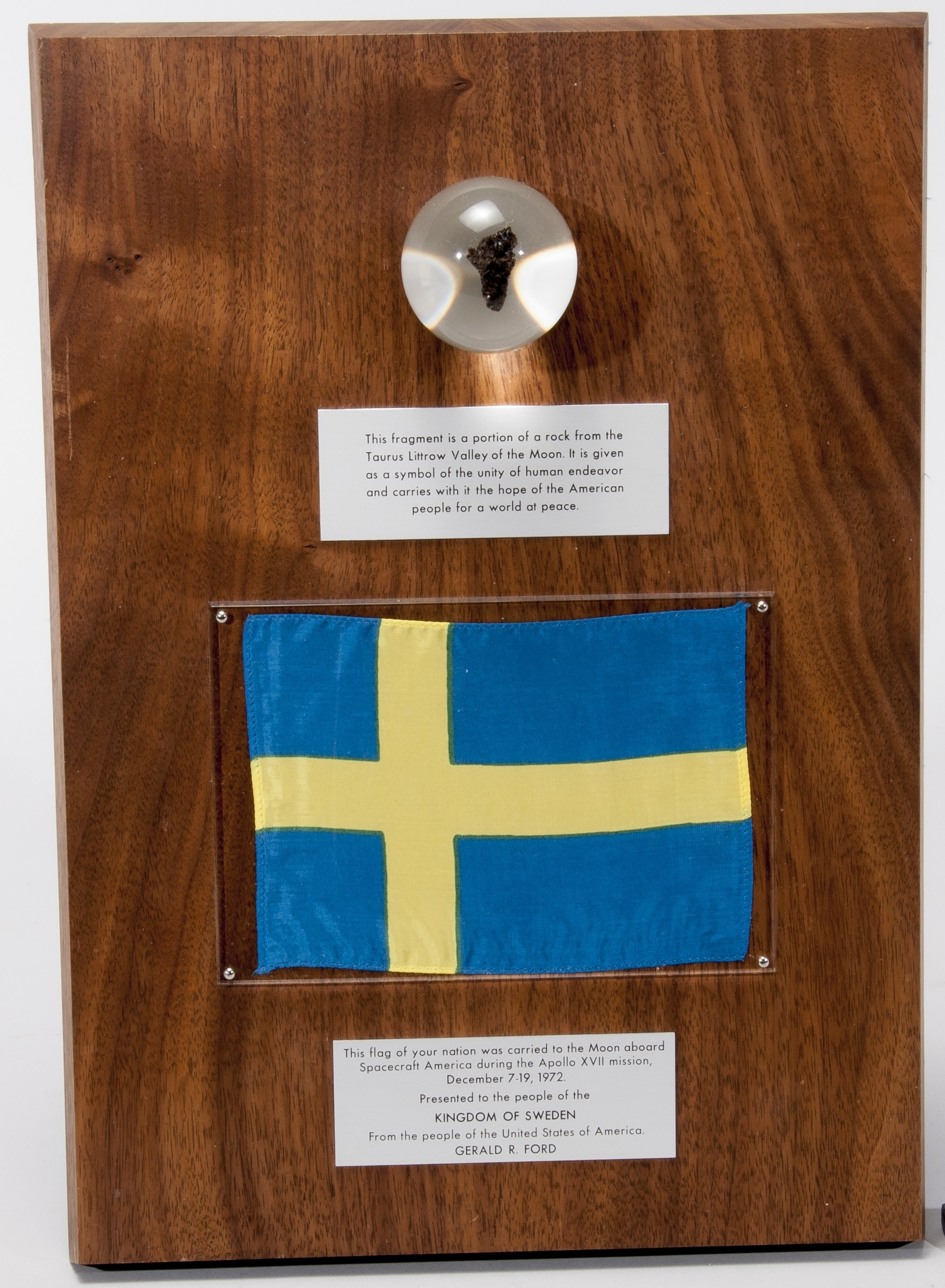
Sweden display

== See also ==
- Apollo 11 lunar sample display
- List of Apollo lunar sample displays
