= The Concubine's Secret =

2009 novel by Kate Furnivall

- First edition (publ. Sphere Books)
- Author: Kate Furnivall
- Language: English
- Publication date: 2009

The Concubine's Secret, as known as The Girl from Junchow in USA, is a 2009 novel by Kate Furnivall; it is the sequel to The Russian Concubine. It followed by journey of Lydia Ivanova and Chang An Lo, whose separation lives when she searched for her father along with her half-brother and Chang is a high-ranking officer.

== Plot ==
This book is set after events of The Russian Concubine, after Lydia's mother's death by spies and after she discovered family secrets of her father, Jens. Lydia Ivanova goes with her half-brother, Alexai Serov, and their protector, Live Popkov, to find Lydia and Alexai's father, who was prisoner of a labor camp. While on the train to Russia, she meets Antonina, who is the wife of Dmitri Malofeyev, the ruthless officer who is head of the camp where her father is. Meanwhile, in China her lover, Chang An Lo, is a high-ranking officer in Mao Zedong's army, after being released from prison. Things turn worse when Alexai goes missing and Lydia finds herself for trouble; it's now up to Chang An Lo to save her.

== Characters ==
- Lydia Ivanova : 17-year-old red-headed girl who was born to a Danish father and Russian mother; exiled from Russia at age of 5, after her father Jens was captured by Russians and taken away; becomes lovers with Chang An Lo; Lydia learns she and Alexai had same father Jens; she goes to Russia after her mother's death to find Jens
- Chang An Lo : Lydia's boyfriend, who was kung fu master; becomes high-ranking officer, who still loves Lydia after she goes to Russia; Chang decides quit to find her
- Alexei Serov : Lydia's half-brother; son of Jens Friis and Natalie Serova, who found out Lydia is his half-sister and father was Jens and blames his mother with troubled past; moved to China with his mother at 12
- Live Popkov : Lydia's Ukrainian protector, who was a friend of Valentina's
- Antonina Malofeyev : Dmitri's wife, who was troubled woman who fell in love with Alexei and killed her husband for saving Lydia
- Dmitri Malofeyev: A ruthless officer of Prison Camp where Lydia's father was held; abusive toward his wife Antonia. When he met Lydia his lust for her led him to try to rape her twice, before he was killed by his own wife
- Elena Gorshikova: an ex-prostitute, who become Live's lover and single mother to her son Dommanick, age 16,
- Leonid Ventov : Russian businessman, who worked with Dmitri
- Edik : a young pickpocket, who becomes Lydia's ally; he lost his parents four years ago
- Maksim Voshchinsky : leader of the group, who become friends with Lydia and Alexei when they join the gang; Maksim had two sons with his late wife
- Mikhail Vushnev : a man who lured Alexei Serov and beat him
- Li Ta-cao: An-lo's superior
- Luo Wen-cai: An-lo's superior, who idolized him
- Chou En-lei : An-lo's superior
- Hu Tai-wai: Biao's father, who was shoemaker of An Lo
- Hu Yi-lang: Baio's mother
- Hu Siqi : Biao's younger sister, who had illness who had feelings for An Lo
- Hu Biao: Chang An-lo's friend and assistant
- Tang Kuan: Chang An-lo's friend, who become his officer and met Lydia
- Konstantin Duretin : a man who saved Alexei's life
- Niko : Alexei's driver
- Olga: Jens' friend who was prisoner of war who missed her children
- Anoosuka : Jens' friend
- Igor: Alexei's friend
- Babaitsky: a ruthless prison camp who was friend of Dmitri and shot Live near to death
