= Apollo 11 lunar sample display =

1970 commemorative gifts

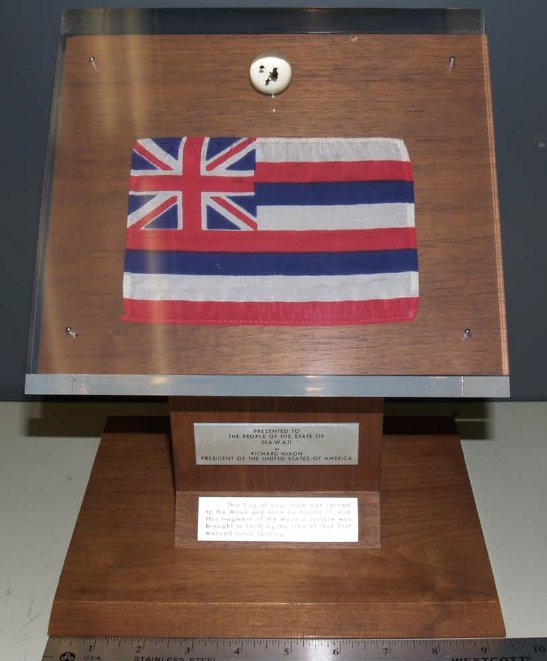
Hawaii Apollo 11 display

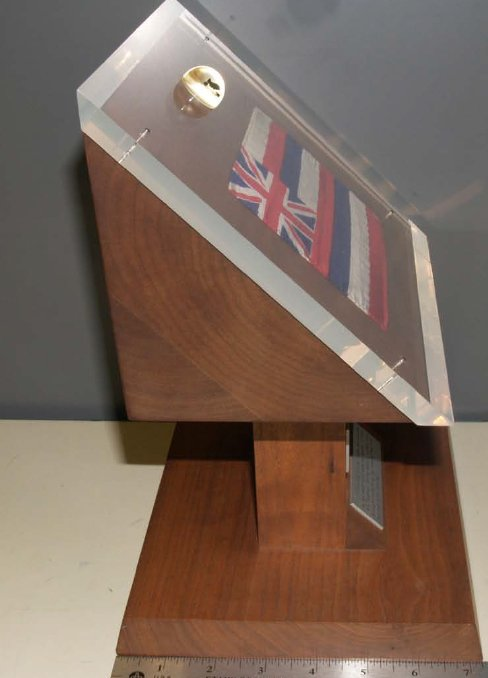
Hawaii Apollo 11 display

The Apollo 11 lunar sample display is a commemorative podium style plaque display consisting of four dust particle specimens (dubbed "Moon rocks"), the recipient's flag and two small metal plates attached with descriptive messages. The Apollo 11 plaques were given as gifts in 1970 by President Richard Nixon to 135 countries, the 50 states of the United States and its territories, and the United Nations.

== History and description ==
At the request of Nixon, NASA had about 250 presentation plaques made following Apollo 11 in 1969. Each included about four rice-sized particles of Moon dust from the mission totaling about 50 mg. The Apollo 11 lunar sample display has an acrylic plastic button containing the Moon dust mounted with the recipient's country or state flag that had been to the Moon and back. All 135 countries received the display, as did the 50 states of the United States and the U.S. provinces and the United Nations.

The plaques were given as gifts by Nixon in 1970. With the exception of Venezuela, whose actual flag was not flown to the Moon on Apollo 11, the wording on the plaque (with the appropriate name filled in) was:

"Presented to the people of _____ by Richard Nixon, President of the United States of America.

"This flag of your state was carried to the Moon and back by Apollo 11 and this fragment of the Moon's surface was brought to Earth by the crew of that first manned lunar landing."

== Fate ==
The New York Times reported in 2012 that gifts of moon rocks were not well tracked or managed by NASA. Within the US, public gifts require legislation to be transferred, but other nations set their own laws. Some samples of lunar dust soil from the Apollo 11 and lunar basalt 70017 from the later Apollo 17 missions have been reported missing. Since 2005 entities and people have made concerted efforts to find the displays. Joseph Gutheinz, a former NASA Office of Inspector General special agent and a professor who teaches an online course at the University of Phoenix, had his students try to locate the displays. Robert Pearlman of collectSPACE has also tracked the displays.

== See also ==
- Apollo 17 lunar sample display
- List of Apollo lunar sample displays
