= Perles =

Perles may refer to

- Perles, Aisne, a commune in the Aisne department in Picardie in northern France
- Perles-et-Castelet, a commune in the Ariège department in southwestern France
- Perles, the French name for Pieterlen, Switzerland
- Alfred Perlès (1897–1990), Austrian-British writer
- George Perles (1934–2020), American football coach
- Joseph Perles (1835–1894), Hungarian rabbi
- Micha Perles, Israeli mathematician
  - Perles configuration
- Tessalon Perles

== See also ==
- Perle (disambiguation)
- Perls
