= Robert Pearlman =

American space historian (born 1976)

Robert Zane Pearlman
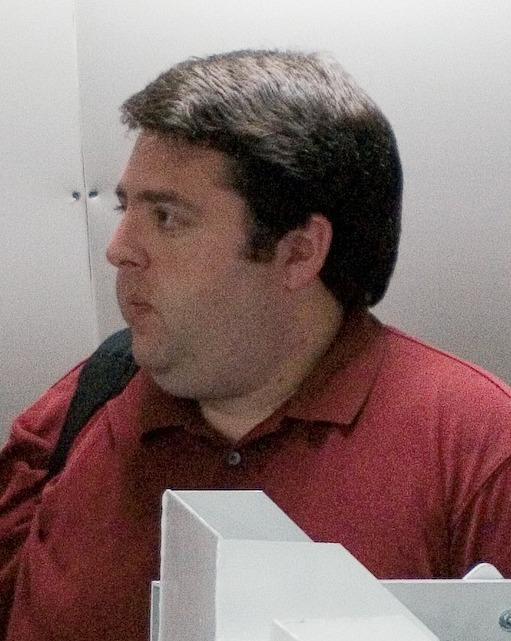
- Robert Pearlman in 2012
- Born: January 14, 1976 (age 50); Livingston, New Jersey
- Occupation: American space historian

Robert Zane Pearlman (born January 14, 1976) is an American space historian and the founder and editor of collectSPACE, a website devoted to news and information concerning space exploration and space-related artifacts and memorabilia, especially in popular culture. He is also a contributing writer to Space.com.

== Biography ==
Pearlman was born in Livingston, New Jersey but considers West Orange, New Jersey his hometown. He attended the University of Maryland, College Park from 1994 to 1997 studying astronomy, physics and English.

In 1996, he developed the website promoting Apollo 11 moonwalker Buzz Aldrin's first novel. From 1997 to 2003, Pearlman served as first the director of communications and later marketing director for Space Adventures, the first company to book privately financed spaceflight participants on flights to the International Space Station. He was communities producer for Space.com from 2000 to 2001. From 1998 to 2003, he was the on-air host for National Space Day webcasts from the National Air and Space Museum. In 1999, he founded collectSPACE, an online community and resource for space history enthusiasts.

Pearlman is a member of the US Space Walk of Fame Foundation Board of Directors, serves on the History Committee of the American Astronautical Society and on the nominating induction committee for the US Astronaut Hall of Fame. He is a director emeritus of the National Space Society, and former national chair of the Students for the Exploration and Development and Space. Pearlman is also a member of the Leadership Board of For All Moonkind, Inc.

In 2001, his work on collectSPACE earned Pearlman the Collector of the Year Award from the Universal Autograph Collectors Club. In 2009, he was inducted into the United States Space Camp Hall of Fame, in part for his work on collectSPACE. Pearlman lives in the Nassau Bay area of Houston, Texas.

== See also ==
- Apollo 11 lunar sample display
- Apollo 17 lunar sample display

== Bibliography ==
- Dubbs, Chris; Realizing Tomorrow: The Path to Private Spaceflight; Outward Odyssey: A People's History of Spacecraft; U of Nebraska Press, 2011; ISBN 0803216106
