= Sweden lunar sample displays =

Commemorative plaques gifted in 1970 and 1973

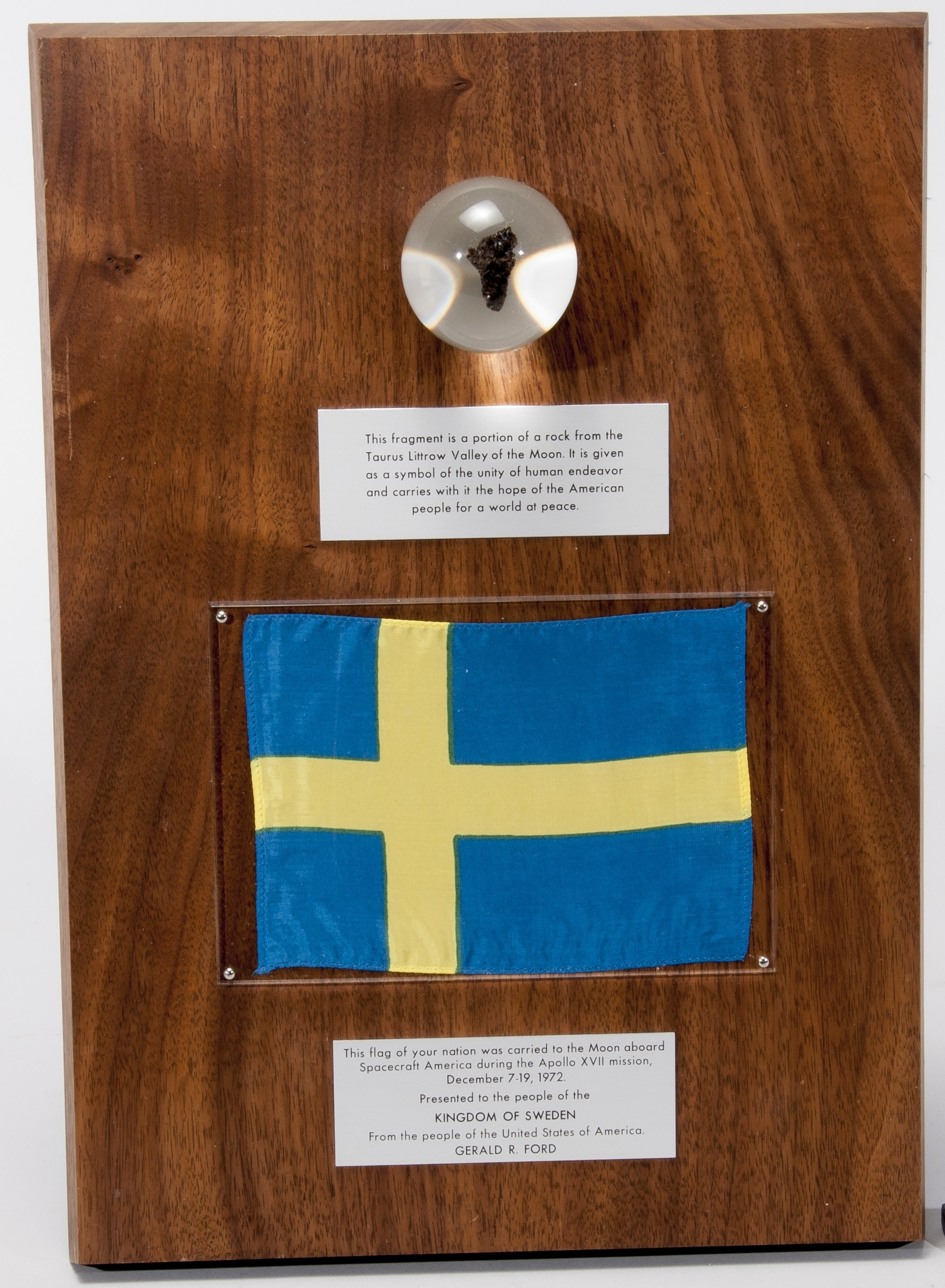
The Swedish Apollo 17 lunar sample display consisting of a Moon rock fragment from a lava Moon stone.

The Sweden goodwill lunar displays are two commemorative plaques consisting of tiny fragments of Moon specimens brought back with the Apollo 11 and Apollo 17 lunar missions. These plaques were given to the people of Sweden by United States President Richard Nixon as goodwill gifts.

== Description ==
=== Apollo 11 ===
At the request of Nixon, NASA had about 250 presentation plaques made following Apollo 11 in 1969. Each included about four rice-sized particles of Moon dust from the mission totaling about 50 mg. The Apollo 11 lunar sample display has an acrylic plastic button containing the Moon dust mounted with the recipient's country or state flag that had been to the Moon and back. All 135 countries received the display, as did the 50 states of the United States and the U.S. provinces and the United Nations.

The plaques were given as gifts by Nixon in 1970.

=== Apollo 17 ===
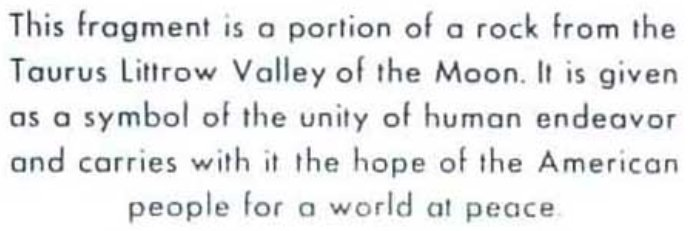
Message on Apollo 17 plaque

The sample Moon rock collected during the Apollo 17 mission was later named lunar basalt 70017, and dubbed the Goodwill rock. Pieces of the rock weighing about 1.14 grams were placed inside a piece of acrylic lucite, and mounted, along with a flag of the country which would receive it, that had flown on Apollo 17.

In 1973 Nixon had the plaques sent to 135 countries, and to the United States with its territories, as a goodwill gesture.

== History ==
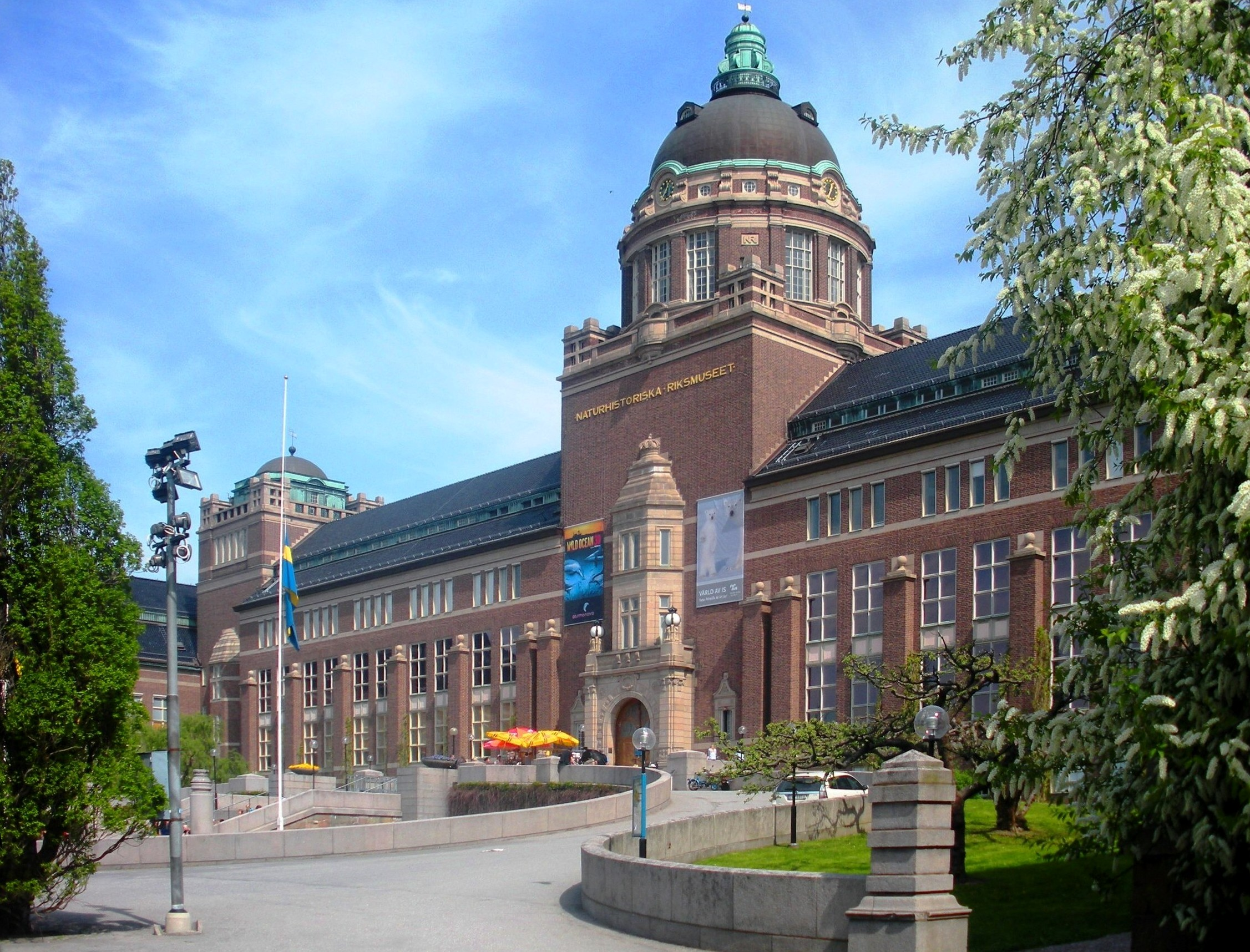
Swedish Museum of Natural History

The Apollo 17 display is at the National Museum of Science and Technology.

The Apollo 11 plaque display given to Sweden was stolen from the Swedish Museum of Natural History in Stockholm on September 7, 2002.

== See also ==
- List of Apollo lunar sample displays
