= Malta lunar sample displays =

The Malta lunar sample displays are two commemorative plaques consisting of small fragments of Moon specimen brought back with the Apollo 11 and Apollo 17 lunar missions and were given to the people of Malta by United States President Richard Nixon as goodwill gifts.

== Description ==
=== Apollo 11 ===
At the request of Nixon, NASA had about 250 presentation plaques made following Apollo 11 in 1969. Each included about four rice-sized particles of Moon dust from the mission totaling about 50 mg. The Apollo 11 lunar sample display has an acrylic plastic button containing the Moon dust mounted with the recipient's country or state flag that had been to the Moon and back. All 135 countries received the display, as did the 50 states of the United States and the U.S. provinces and the United Nations.

The plaques were given as gifts by Nixon in 1970.

=== Apollo 17 ===
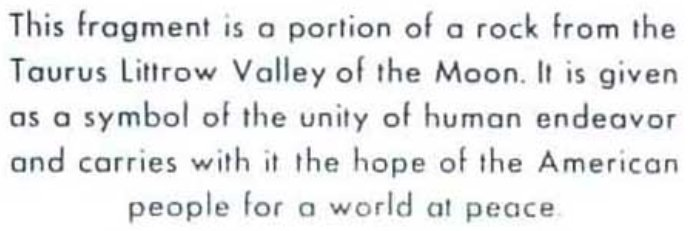
Message on Apollo 17 plaque

The sample Moon rock collected during the Apollo 17 mission was later named lunar basalt 70017, and dubbed the Goodwill rock. Pieces of the rock weighing about 1.14 grams were placed inside a piece of acrylic lucite, and mounted, along with a flag of the country which would receive it, that had flown on Apollo 17.

In 1973 Nixon had the plaques sent to 135 countries, and to the United States with its territories, as a goodwill gesture.

== History ==
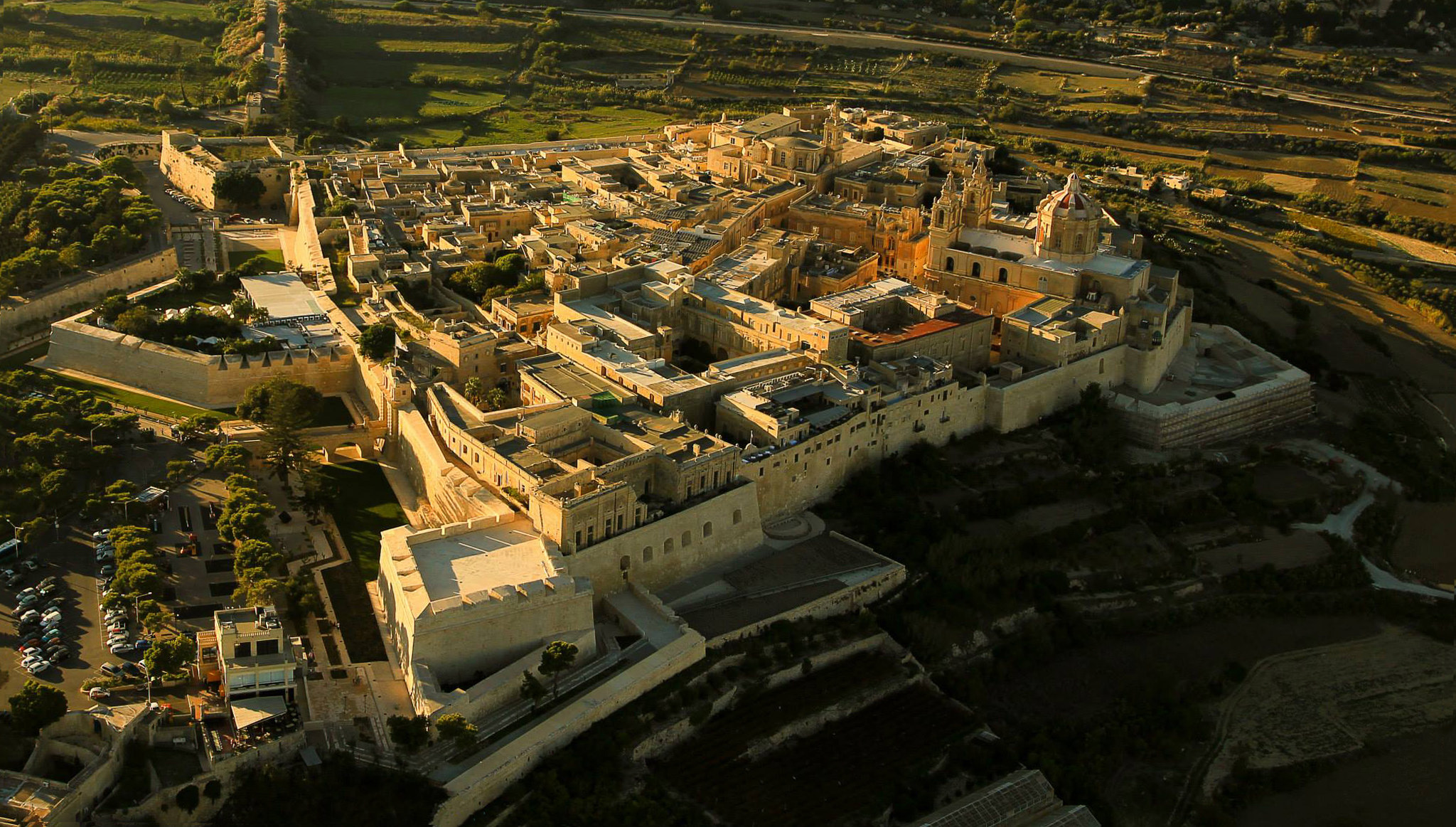
A 2014 aerial view of Mdina and its walls

The Maltese Apollo 17 display was stolen from the Museum of Natural History in Mdina in 2004. The Maltese flag that had flown on the Apollo 17 mission was left behind. As of 2012, the Apollo 17 Maltese "goodwill Moon rock" is still missing.

The Maltese Apollo 11 display given to Malta is housed in the Gozo Museum of Natural Science in Gozo, Malta.

== See also ==
- List of Apollo lunar sample displays
