= Netherlands lunar sample displays =

Gift from the US to the Netherlands

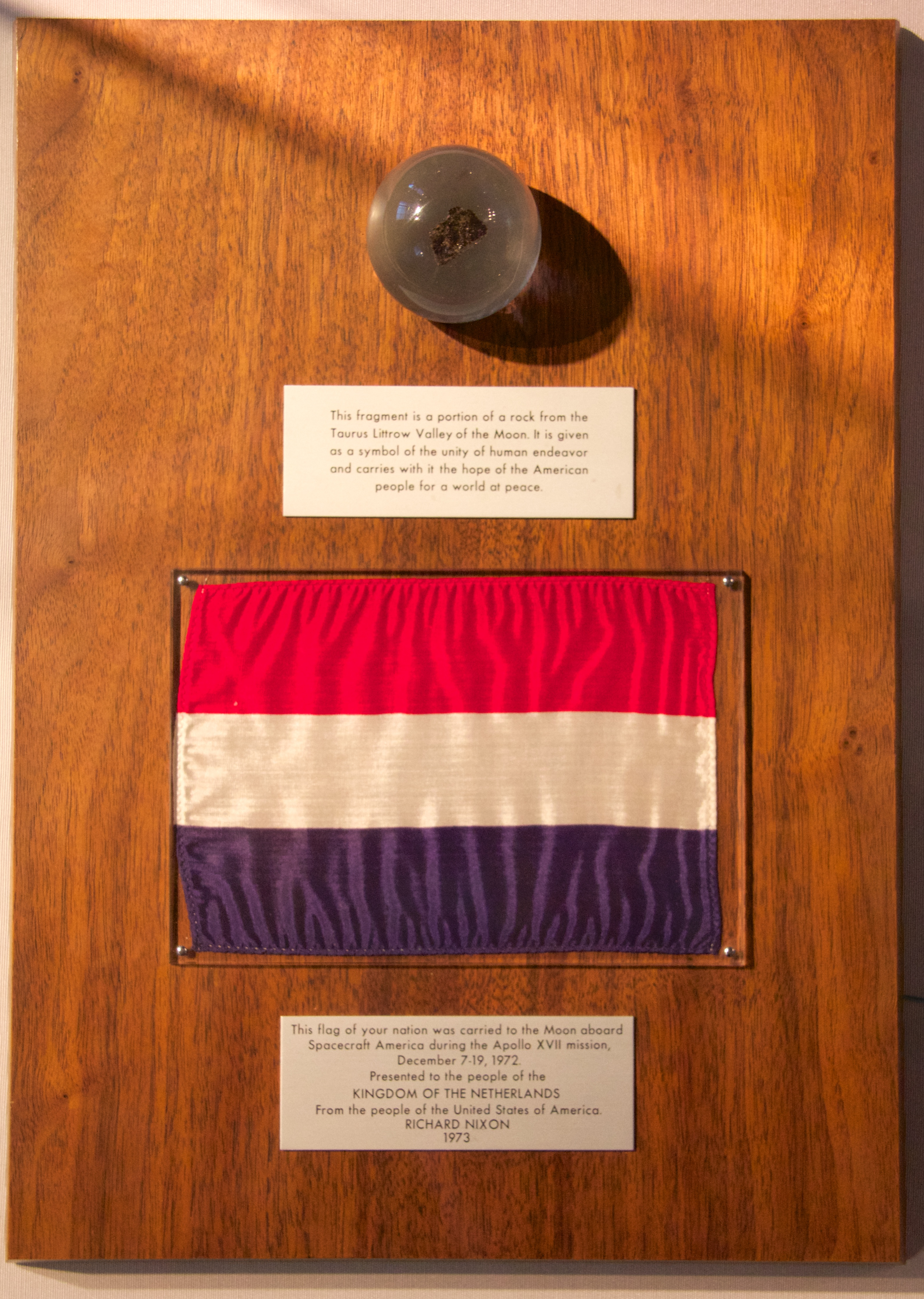
Netherlands Apollo 17 display

The Netherlands lunar sample displays are two commemorative plaques consisting of small fragments of Moon specimens brought back with the Apollo 11 and Apollo 17 Moon missions and given to the people of the Netherlands by President Richard Nixon as goodwill gifts.

== Description ==
=== Apollo 11 ===
At the request of Nixon, NASA had about 250 presentation plaques made following Apollo 11 in 1969. Each included about four rice-sized particles of Moon dust from the mission totaling about 50 mg. The Apollo 11 lunar sample display has an acrylic plastic button containing the Moon dust mounted with the recipient's country or state flag that had been to the Moon and back. All 135 countries received the display, as did the 50 states of the United States and the U.S. provinces and the United Nations.

The plaques were given as gifts by Nixon in 1970.

=== Apollo 17 ===
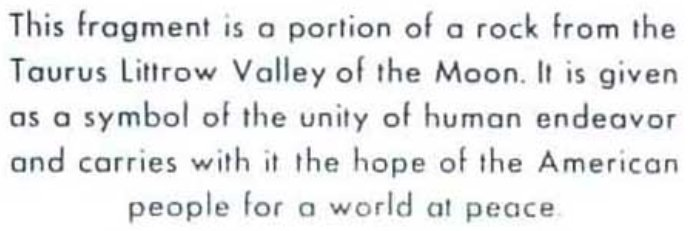
Message on Apollo 17 plaque

The sample Moon rock collected during the Apollo 17 mission was later named lunar basalt 70017, and dubbed the Goodwill rock. Pieces of the rock weighing about 1.14 grams were placed inside a piece of acrylic lucite, and mounted, along with a flag of the country which would receive it, that had flown on Apollo 17.

In 1973 Nixon had the plaques sent to 135 countries, and to the United States with its territories, as a goodwill gesture.

== History ==
According to Moon rock researcher Robert Pearlman, both the Netherlands Apollo 11 and Apollo 17 lunar sample displays are in the National Museum of the History of Science and Medicine in Leiden, Netherlands.

The Rijksmuseum of the Netherlands said in 1992 that it received a so called "moon rock" from the estate of Netherlands Prime Minister Willem Drees. As it turned out, the prime minister had misidentified and marked the object as a moon rock after he received it from the then US ambassador William Middendorf, who had gotten it from the U.S. State Department. The museum put the object on display and identified it as a moon rock after verifying its authenticity first via a phone call with NASA. When it was subsequently examined years later it was found to be just a piece of petrified wood. It's important to note that NASA, the US space agency, never claimed to have given Drees a moon rock, was not the source of the petrified wood piece, never had it in their possession nor gave it to the prime minister.

== See also ==
- List of Apollo lunar sample displays
- Stolen and missing Moon rocks
