= California lunar sample displays =

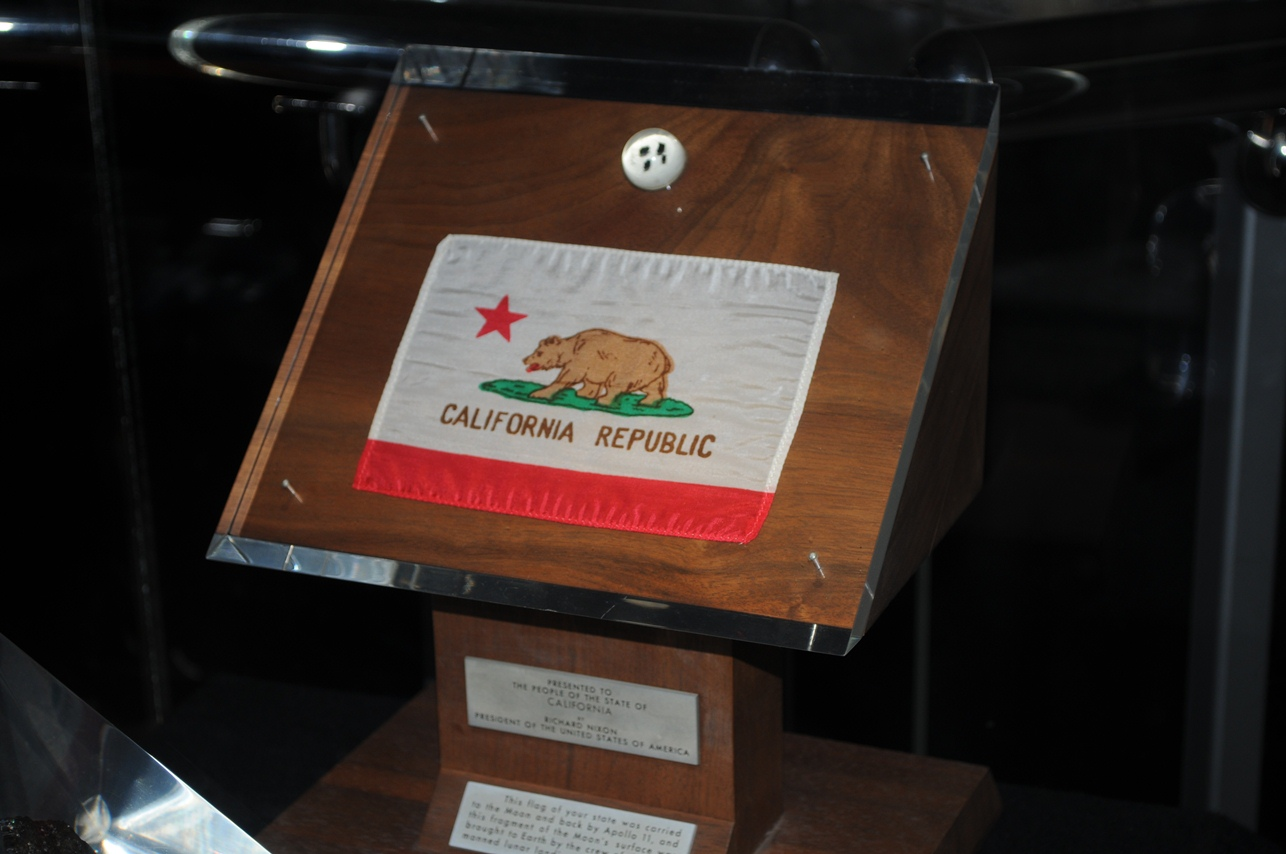
Apollo 11 lunar sample display

The California lunar sample displays are two commemorative plaques consisting of small fragments of Moon specimen brought back with the Apollo 11 and Apollo 17 lunar missions and given in the 1970s to the people of the state of California by United States President Richard Nixon as goodwill gifts.

== Description ==
=== Apollo 11 ===
At the request of Nixon, NASA had about 250 presentation plaques made following Apollo 11 in 1969. Each included about four rice-sized particles of Moon dust from the mission totaling about 50 mg. The Apollo 11 lunar sample display has an acrylic plastic button containing the Moon dust mounted with the recipient's country or state flag that had been to the Moon and back. All 135 countries received the display, as did the 50 states of the United States and the U.S. provinces and the United Nations.

The plaques were given as gifts by Nixon in 1970.

=== Apollo 17 ===
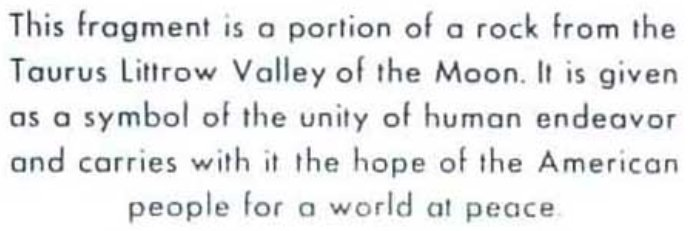
Message on Apollo 17 plaque

The sample Moon rock collected during the Apollo 17 mission was later named lunar basalt 70017, and dubbed the Goodwill rock. Pieces of the rock weighing about 1.14 grams were placed inside a piece of acrylic lucite, and mounted, along with a flag of the country which would receive it, that had flown on Apollo 17.

In 1973 Nixon had the plaques sent to 135 countries, and to the United States with its territories, as a goodwill gesture.

== History ==
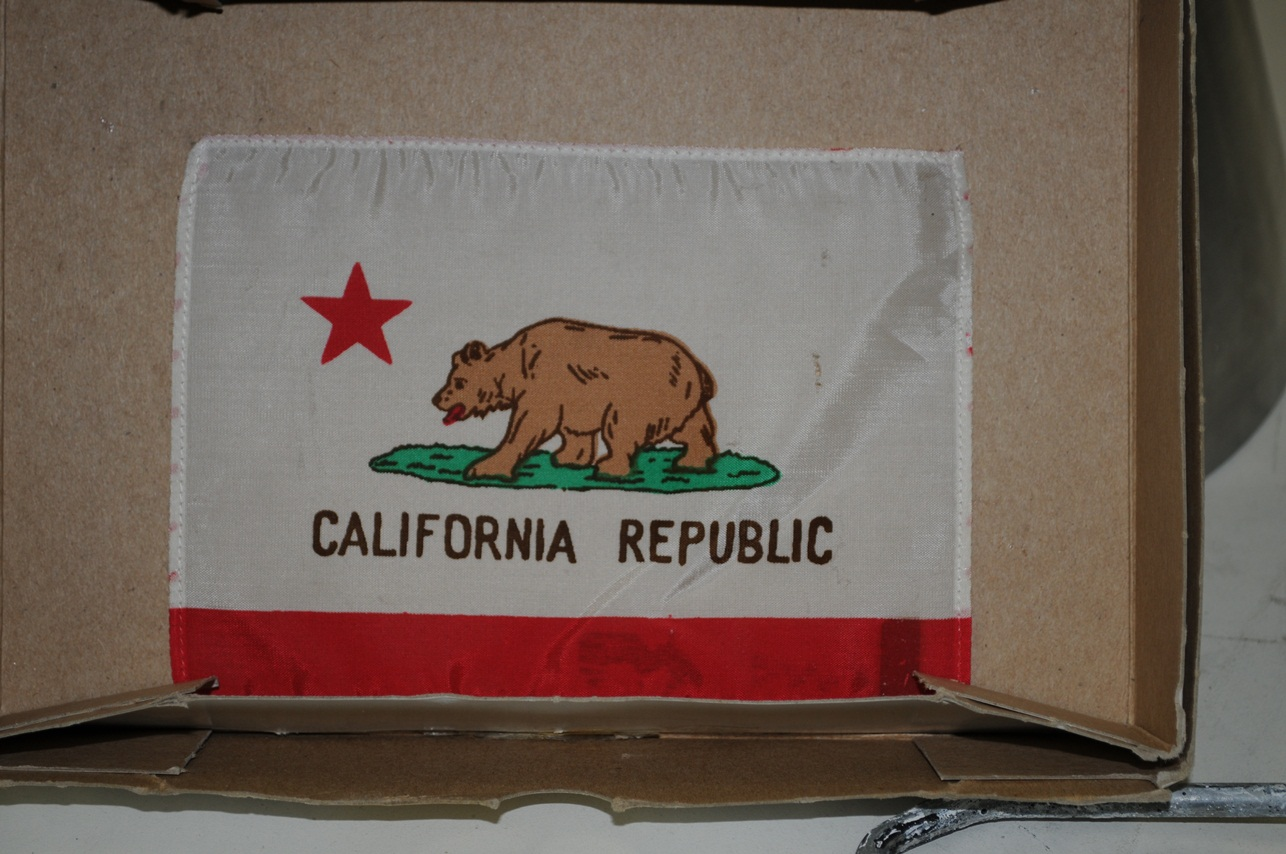
Recovered flag of Apollo 17 goodwill lunar display from museum fire of Feb. 22–23, 1978

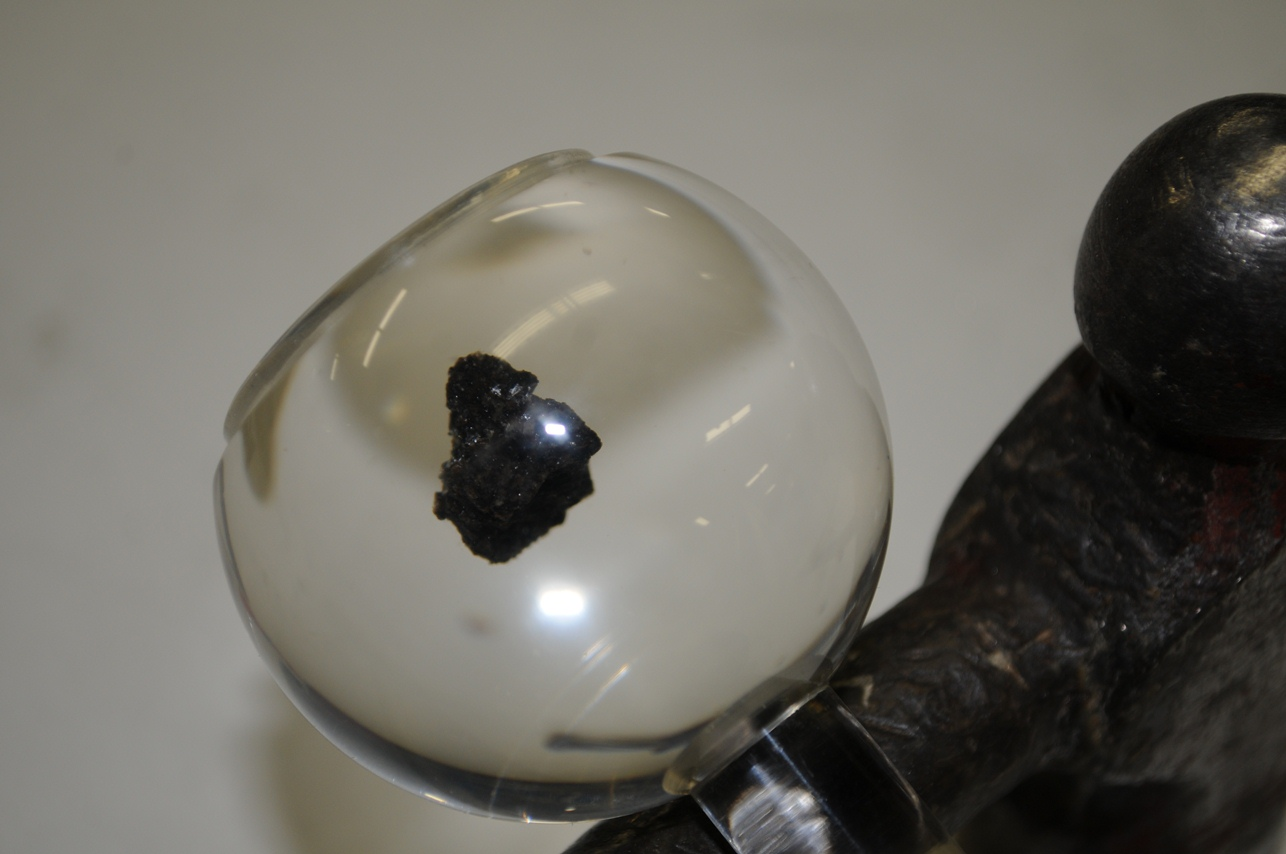
"Moon rock" of the goodwill lunar display recovered from the fire of Feb. 22–23, 1978

The California Apollo 17 lunar sample display burned in a 1978 fire at the San Diego Aero-Space Museum. The damaged plaque is stored at the San Diego Air & Space Museum.

According to Moon rocks researcher Robert Pearlman, the California Apollo 11 display is also housed in the San Diego Air & Space Museum.

== See also ==
- List of Apollo lunar sample displays
