= North Carolina lunar sample displays =

Small fragments of Moon specimen

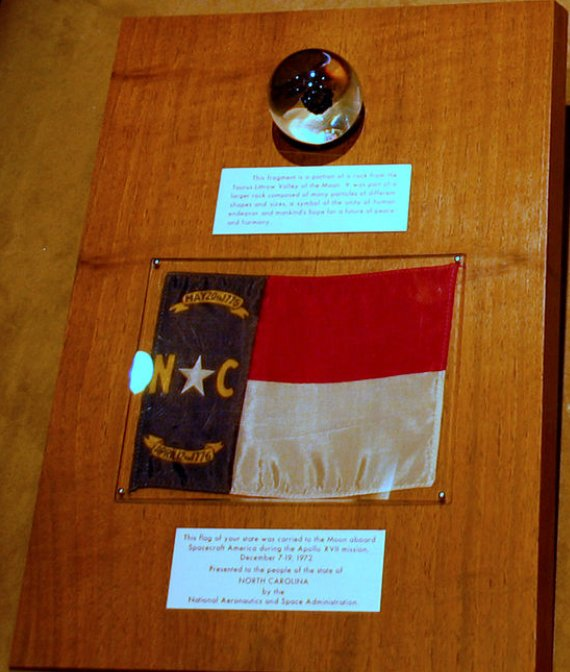
North Carolina Apollo 17 lunar sample display

The North Carolina lunar sample displays are part of two commemorative plaques consisting of small fragments of Moon specimen brought back with the Apollo 11 and Apollo 17 lunar missions and given in the 1970s to the people of the state of North Carolina by United States President Richard Nixon as goodwill gifts.

== Description ==
=== Apollo 11 ===
At the request of Nixon, NASA had about 250 presentation plaques made following Apollo 11 in 1969. Each included about four rice-sized particles of Moon dust from the mission totaling about 50 mg. The Apollo 11 lunar sample display has an acrylic plastic button containing the Moon dust mounted with the recipient's country or state flag that had been to the Moon and back. All 135 countries received the display, as did the 50 states of the United States and the U.S. provinces and the United Nations.

The plaques were given as gifts by Nixon in 1970.

=== Apollo 17 ===
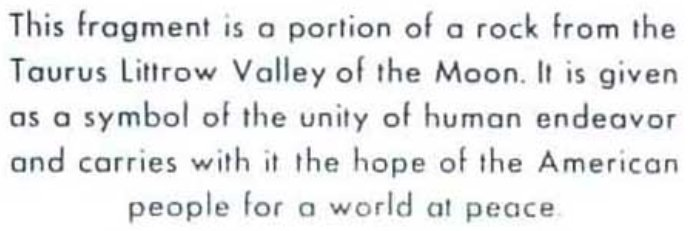
Message on Apollo 17 plaque

The sample Moon rock collected during the Apollo 17 mission was later named lunar basalt 70017, and dubbed the Goodwill rock. Pieces of the rock weighing about 1.14 grams were placed inside a piece of acrylic lucite, and mounted, along with a flag of the country which would receive it, that had flown on Apollo 17.

In 1973 Nixon had the plaques sent to 135 countries, and to the United States with its territories, as a goodwill gesture.

== History ==
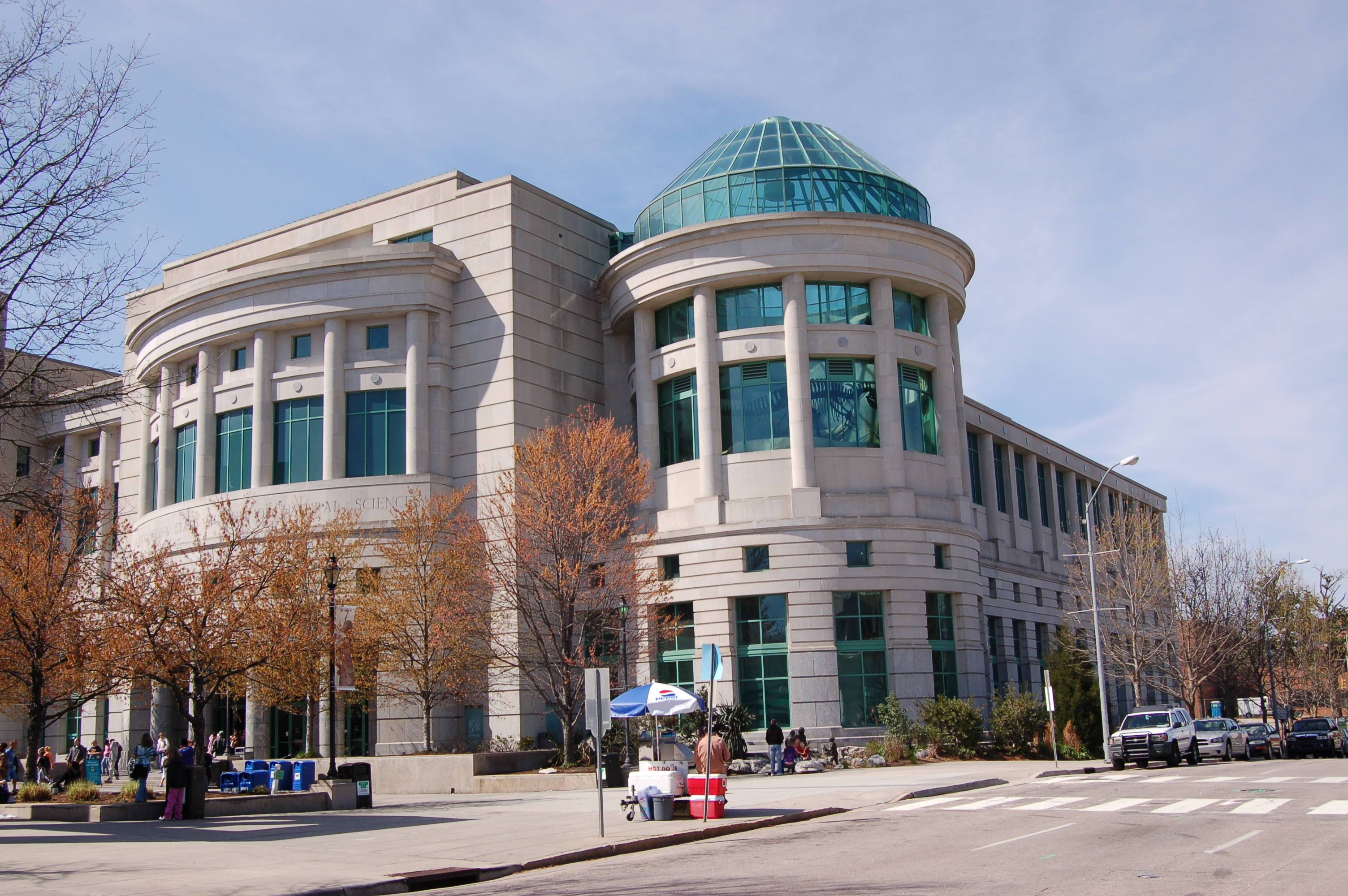
North Carolina Museum of Natural Sciences

The North Carolina Apollo 17 "goodwill Moon rocks" plaque display that was given to the state of North Carolina in 1973 was found in a drawer at the North Carolina Department of Commerce when a new employee came across it in a desk drawer in his new office. The new employee was a colleague of Christopher Brown, professor at North Carolina State University, and loaned the display to Brown. In 2010 Brown presented it to the North Carolina Museum of Natural Sciences for public exhibition in the museum's new wing, where the North Carolina Apollo 11 lunar sample plaque display was already on display.

The Apollo 11 sample display is in the collection of the North Carolina Museum of History in Raleigh. It is not on public exhibition.

== See also ==
- List of Apollo lunar sample displays
