= Ireland lunar sample displays =

The Ireland lunar sample displays are two commemorative plaques consisting of small fragments of Moon rock brought back to Earth by the Apollo 11 and Apollo 17 lunar missions and given to the people of Ireland by United States President Richard Nixon as goodwill gifts.

== Apollo 11 samples ==
At the request of Nixon, NASA had about 250 presentation plaques made following Apollo 11 in 1969. Each included about four rice-sized particles of Moon dust from the mission totaling about 50 mg. The Apollo 11 lunar sample display has an acrylic plastic button containing the Moon dust mounted with the recipient's country or state flag that had been to the Moon and back. All 135 countries received the display, as did the 50 states of the United States and the U.S. provinces and the United Nations.

The plaques were given as gifts by Nixon in 1970.

=== Loss ===
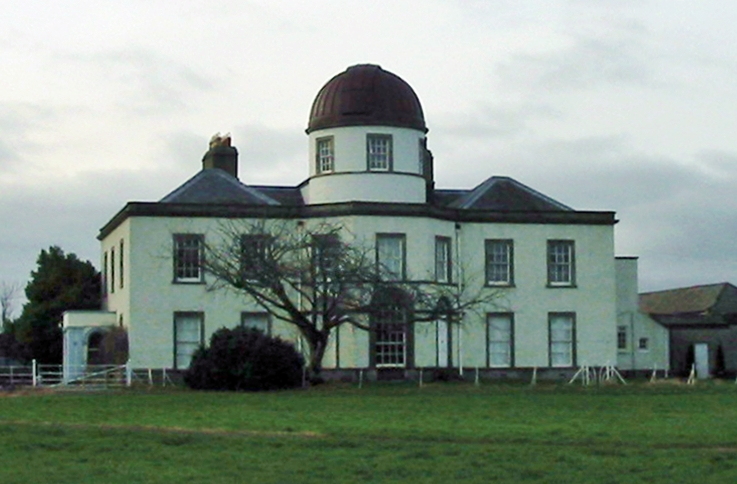
Dunsink Observatory

The Ireland lunar sample was displayed at the Dunsink Observatory in Dublin until a 1977 fire. Afterwards, debris was removed to the dump at the Finglas landfill. The lunar display was among this rubble and was accidentally thrown away. Joseph Gutheinz, a former NASA employee and self-appointed private investigator of the Apollo Moon rock displays, called the discarded Moon rocks a "pot of gold under a dump".

== Apollo 17 samples ==
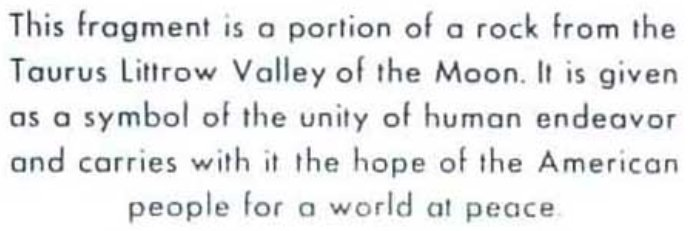
Message on Apollo 17 plaque

The sample Moon rock collected during the Apollo 17 mission was later named lunar basalt 70017, and dubbed the Goodwill rock. Pieces of the rock weighing about 1.14 grams were placed inside a piece of acrylic lucite, and mounted, along with a flag of the country which would receive it, that had flown on Apollo 17.

In 1973 Nixon had the plaques sent to 135 countries, and to the United States with its territories, as a goodwill gesture.

== See also ==
- List of Apollo lunar sample displays
