= Hawaii lunar sample displays =

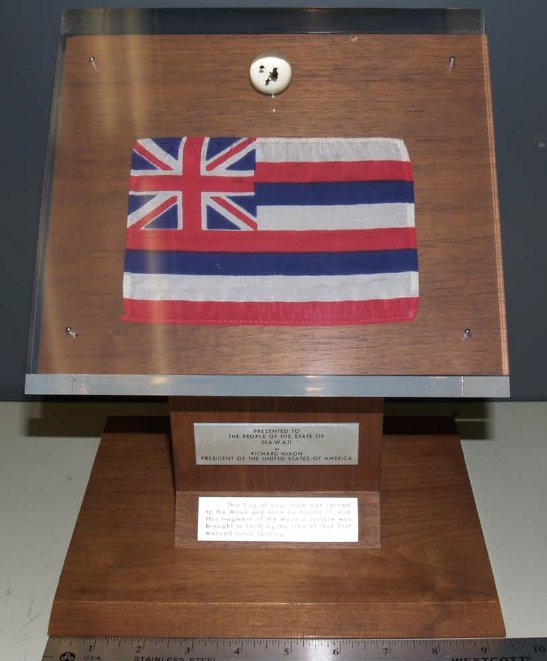
Apollo 11 lunar sample display

The Hawaii lunar sample displays are two commemorative plaques consisting of small fragments of Moon specimen brought back with the Apollo 11 and Apollo 17 lunar missions and given in the 1970s to the people of the state of Hawaii by United States President Richard Nixon as goodwill gifts.

== Description ==
=== Apollo 11 ===
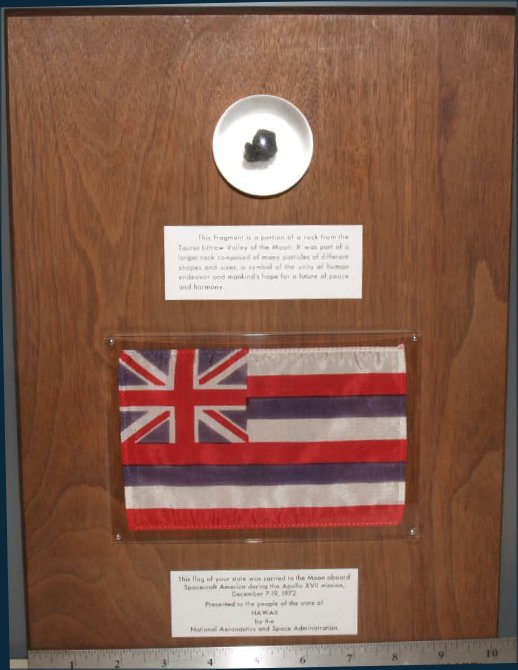
Apollo 17 lunar sample display

At the request of Nixon, NASA had about 250 presentation plaques made following Apollo 11 in 1969. Each included about four rice-sized particles of Moon dust from the mission totaling about 50 mg. The Apollo 11 lunar sample display has an acrylic plastic button containing the Moon dust mounted with the recipient's country or state flag that had been to the Moon and back. All 135 countries received the display, as did the 50 states of the United States and the U.S. provinces and the United Nations.

The plaques were given as gifts by Nixon in 1970.

=== Apollo 17 ===
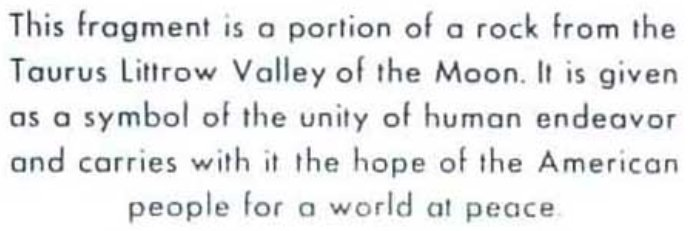
Message on Apollo 17 plaque

The sample Moon rock collected during the Apollo 17 mission was later named lunar basalt 70017, and dubbed the Goodwill rock. Pieces of the rock weighing about 1.14 grams were placed inside a piece of acrylic lucite, and mounted, along with a flag of the country which would receive it, that had flown on Apollo 17.

In 1973 Nixon had the plaques sent to 135 countries, and to the United States with its territories, as a goodwill gesture.

== History ==
Joseph Gutheinz, a former NASA employee and self-appointed private investigator of the Apollo lunar sample displays, reported in 2009 that he did know where Hawaii's Apollo 11 or Apollo 17 "goodwill Moon rocks" plaque displays were. The displays had been stored in a locked cabinet in the governor's office and were located during an inventory in 2010, according to a spokesperson for the governor. The governor's office records showed they had secured both displays, but their exact location was unclear. A senior adviser for the governor's office said they knew all along they were there someplace. The displays were not on exhibit as of 2010.

== See also ==
- List of Apollo lunar sample displays
