= Spain lunar sample displays =

The Spain lunar sample displays are two commemorative plaques consisting of tiny fragments of Moon specimens brought back with the Apollo 11 and Apollo 17 lunar missions. These plaques were given to the people of Spain by United States President Richard Nixon as goodwill gifts.

== Description ==
=== Apollo 11 ===
At the request of Nixon, NASA had about 250 presentation plaques made following Apollo 11 in 1969. Each included about four rice-sized particles of Moon dust from the mission totaling about 50 mg. The Apollo 11 lunar sample display has an acrylic plastic button containing the Moon dust mounted with the recipient's country or state flag that had been to the Moon and back. All 135 countries received the display, as did the 50 states of the United States and the U.S. provinces and the United Nations.

The plaques were given as gifts by Nixon in 1970.

=== Apollo 17 ===
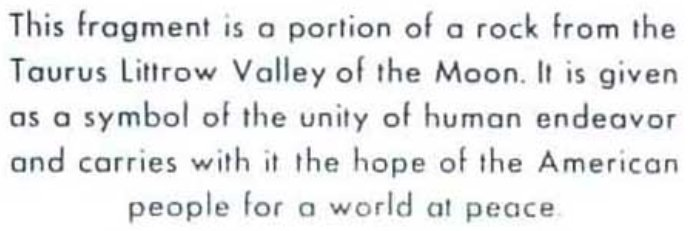
Message on Apollo 17 plaque

The sample Moon rock collected during the Apollo 17 mission was later named lunar basalt 70017, and dubbed the Goodwill rock. Pieces of the rock weighing about 1.14 grams were placed inside a piece of acrylic lucite, and mounted, along with a flag of the country which would receive it, that had flown on Apollo 17.

In 1973 Nixon had the plaques sent to 135 countries, and to the United States with its territories, as a goodwill gesture.

== History ==
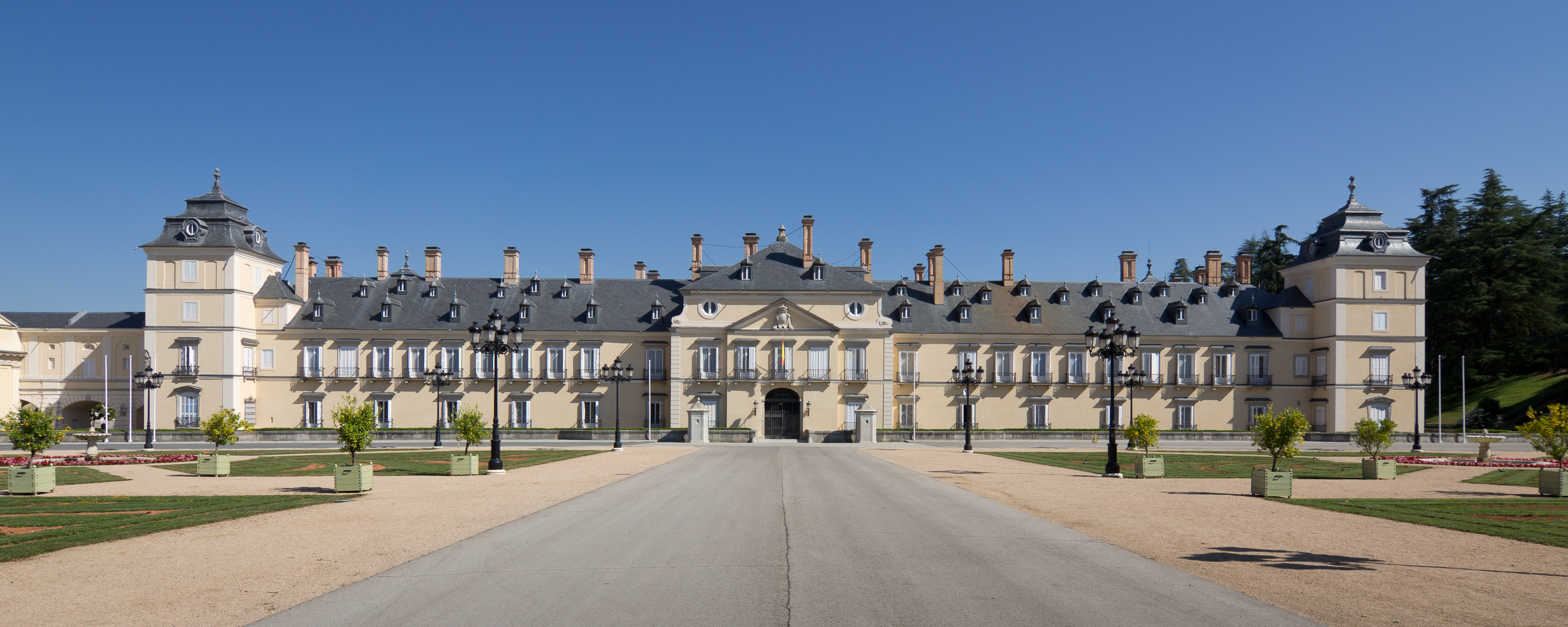
El Pardo Palace

The whereabouts of the Spanish Apollo 11 lunar sample are unknown.

Spanish newspaper El Mundo reported on July 20, 2009, that Franco's grandson, Francisco Franco Martinez Bordiú, claimed the Spanish Apollo 11 lunar sample was gifted to his grandfather personally. It was kept at El Pardo Palace in Franco's office. He said his mother lost the display after Franco's death.

The Apollo 17 commemorative plaque is on display at the Naval Museum in Madrid. Henry Kissinger, Secretary of State during the Nixon administration, gave the Apollo 17 lunar samples to Luis Carrero Blanco and the family eventually donated it to the museum.

== See also ==
- List of Apollo lunar sample displays
