= List of Apollo lunar sample displays =

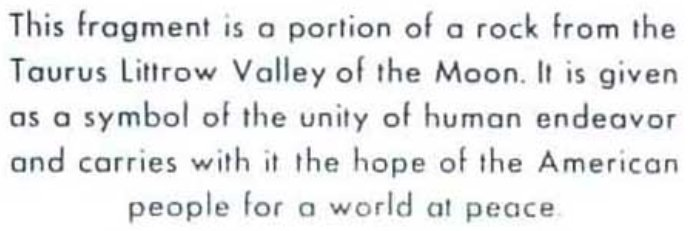
Apollo 17 Goodwill message

This is a list of lunar sample displays from the Apollo program that were distributed through the United States and around the world. They include samples from the Apollo 11 and Apollo 17 missions conducted by NASA in 1969 and 1972.

The Apollo 11 mission to the surface of the Moon returned a few dozen pounds/kilos of lunar material (mainly rock and dust), and the US put about 0.05 grams in small display cases and gave one apiece to the 50 U.S. states, to the nations of the world, and to political entities like the U.S. territories under administration. This was done again with an Apollo 17 sample (Lunar basalt 70017). There are a few samples from Apollo 15 on display.

== United States ==
Listing
| Giftee | Apollo 11 | Apollo 17 | Apollo 15 |
| Alabama | Alabama Department of Archives and History, Montgomery | | |
| Alaska | Alaska State Museum, Juneau | | |
| American Samoa | Jean P. Haydon Museum, Pago Pago | - | |
| Arizona | Arizona Historical Society, Tucson | University of Arizona Mineral Museum, Tucson | |
| Arkansas | Arkansas Museum of Discovery, Little Rock | | |
| California | San Diego Air & Space Museum, San Diego | | |
| Colorado | Colorado State Capitol | Colorado School of Mines Geology Museum, Golden | |
| Connecticut | Museum of Connecticut History, Hartford | | |
| Delaware | Unknown - stolen in 1977 | Delaware Division of Historical and Cultural Affairs | |
| District of Columbia | District of Columbia Office of Public Records | - | |
| Florida | Museum of Florida History, Tallahassee | | |
| Georgia | Georgia State Capitol, Atlanta | Fernbank Museum of Natural History, Atlanta | Tellus Science Museum, Cartersville |
| Guam | Guam Museum, Hagatna | - | |
| Hawaii | Hawaii State Archives | | |
| Idaho | Idaho State Historical Society, Boise | | |
| Illinois | Illinois State Museum, Springfield | | |
| Indiana | Indiana State Museum, Indianapolis | | |
| Iowa | State Historical Museum, Des Moines | | |
| Kansas | Kansas Museum of History, Topeka | Kenneth Spencer Research Library, Lawrence | |
| Kentucky | Kentucky Historical Society, Frankfort | | |
| Louisiana | Louisiana Art and Science Museum, Baton Rouge | Louisiana State Museum, New Orleans | |
| Maine | Maine State Museum, Augusta | | |
| Maryland | Maryland State Archives, Annapolis | | |
| Massachusetts | Museum of Science, Boston | | |
| Michigan | Michigan Historical Museum, Lansing | Unknown - missing since 1972 | Calvin University, Grand Rapids |
| Minnesota | Minnesota Historical Society, Saint Paul | | |
| Mississippi | Department of Archives and History, Jackson | | |
| Missouri | Missouri State Museum, Jefferson City | | |
| Montana | Montana Historical Society, Helena | | |
| Nebraska | University of Nebraska State Museum, Lincoln | | |
| Nevada | Nevada State Museum, Carson City | | |
| New Hampshire | McAuliffe-Shepard Discovery Center, Concord | | |
| New Jersey | New Jersey State Museum, Trenton | Unknown - missing since 1976 | |
| New Mexico | Palace of Governors, Santa Fe | Roswell Museum and Art Center, Roswell | |
| New York | Unknown | New York State Museum, Albany | |
| North Carolina | North Carolina Museum of History, Raleigh | North Carolina Museum of Natural Sciences, Raleigh | |
| North Dakota | State Historical Society, Bismarck | | |
| Ohio | Ohio History Center, Columbus | | |
| Oklahoma | Oklahoma History Center, Oklahoma City | | |
| Oregon | Oregon State Capitol, Salem | Oregon Museum of Science and Industry, Portland | |
| Pennsylvania | State Museum of Pennsylvania, Harrisburg | | |
| Puerto Rico | La Fortaleza, San Juan | - | |
| Rhode Island | State Library, Providence | State Archives, Providence | |
| South Carolina | Governor's Mansion, Columbia | South Carolina State Museum, Columbia | |
| South Dakota | South Dakota State Historical Society, Pierre | W.H. Over Museum, Vermillion | |
| Tennessee | Tennessee State Museum, Nashville | Pink Palace Museum, Memphis | |
| Texas | Museum of Texas Tech University, Lubbock | Texas State History Museum, Austin | |
| Utah | Clark Planetarium, Salt Lake City | Natural History Museum of Utah, Salt Lake City | |
| Vermont | Vermont Historical Society, Barre | | |
| Virginia | Library of Virginia, Richmond | Science Museum of Virginia, Richmond | |
| Washington | Washington State Historical Society, Tacoma | | |
| West Virginia | West Virginia State Museum, Charleston | | |
| Wisconsin | Wisconsin Historical Museum, Madison | | |
| Wyoming | Wyoming State Capitol, Cheyenne | Wyoming State Museum, Cheyenne | |

== International ==
The display cases included a lunar sample and small flag of the respective political entity that had been to the Moon and back. Approximately 135 displays were gifted to nations of the world at that time, so nations created since then are not included and some displays have been inherited from past nations

Listing
| Giftee | Apollo 11 | Apollo 17 | Apollo 15 | | |
Afghanistan
| Albania | | | | | |
Algeria
Andorra
| Argentina | Galileo Galilei planetarium, Buenos Aires | | | | |
| Australia | National Archives of Australia, Canberra | National Museum of Australia, Canberra | | | |
| Austria | Technisches Museum Wien, Vienna | Naturhistorisches Museum, Vienna | | | |
| Bangladesh | Bangabandhu Military Museum | | | | |
Barbados
| Belgium | Royal Belgian Institute for Natural Sciences, Brussels | | | | |
Bhutan
| Bolivia | | Planetario Max Schreier, La Paz | | | |
Botswana
| Brazil | Unknown | Bagé | | | |
| Bulgaria | | National Museum of Natural History, Sofia | | | |
| Burma | | National Museum of Myanmar (Yangon) | | | |
Burundi
Cameroon
| Canada | Unknown | Canada Science and Technology Museum | | | |
| Cambodia | | National Museum of Cambodia | | | |
Central African Republic
| Ceylon (Sri Lanka) | Colombo | | | | |
Chad
| Chile | Eduardo Frei Montalva's Historic House Museum, Santiago | Museo Nacional de Historia Natural, Santiago | | | |
| China | Unknown | Beijing Planetarium, Beijing (Note: The Apollo 17 luna sample was brought to China by National Security Advisor Zbigniew Brzezinski in May 1978 as a gift to Hua Guofeng, paramount leader of China. According to reports from Chinese media, the 1.14-gram lunar sample was divided into two halves: one was sent to scientists in China Academy of Sciences for research, from which around 40 scientific papers were published; another, 0.5-gram weight, was preserved in Beijing Planetarium.) | | | |
| Colombia | Bogotá Planetarium, Bogotá | | | | |
Congo (Brazzaville)
Congo (Kinshasa)
| Costa Rica | Museo Nacional de Costa Rica, San Jose | | | | |
Cuba
Cyprus
| Czechoslovakia | Vojenský historický ústav, Prague | | | | |
Dahomey
| Denmark | Natural History Museum of Denmark, Copenhagen | | | | |
| Dominican Republic | Museo Nacional de Historia Natural, Santo Domingo | | | | |
Ecuador
| Egypt | Egyptian Geological Museum, Cairo | | | | |
| El Salvador | | MUNA, Zona Rosa | | | |
Equatorial Guinea
Ethiopia
| Finland | Urho Kekkonen Museum Tamminiemi, Helsinki | GTK, Otaniemi | | | |
| France | Muséum d'histoire naturelle, Nantes | Palais de la Découverte, Paris | | | |
Gabon
Gambia
| Germany | Naturmuseum Senckenberg, Frankfurt | Deutsches Museum, Munich | Technik Museum Speyer, Speyer | Haus der Geschichte, Bonn | Rieskrater Museum, Nördlingen |
Ghana
| Greece | National Archeological Museum, Athens | | | | |
| Guatemala | Ministry of Culture and Sport, Guatemala City | | | | |
| Guyana | | National Museum of Guyana, Georgetown | | | |
Haiti
| Honduras | Unknown | Tegucigalpa | | | |
| Hungary | Magyar Természettudományi Múzeum, Budapest | | | | |
| Iceland | | The Exploration Museum, Húsavík | | | |
| India | | Parliament Museum, New Delhi | | | |
Indonesia
Iran
Iraq
| Ireland | Dunsink (Note: Kept at Dunsink Observatory until that was damaged in a 1977 fire, after which it is presumed to have been among the debris dumped in the adjacent landfill site.) | National Museum of Ireland | | | |
| Israel | Israel State Archives, Jerusalem | Eretz Israel Museum, Tel Aviv (presumed) | | | |
| Italy | | Museo Nazionale Della Scienza E Della Tecnologia "Leonardo da Vinci", Milan | | | |
| Jamaica | Jamaica Archives & Records Department, Spanish Town | | | | |
| Japan | National Museum, Tokyo | | | | |
Jordan
Kenya
| Korea | Presidential Archives, Sejong | National Science Museum, Daejeon | | | |
Kuwait
| Laos | Royal Palace Museum, Luang Prabang | | | | |
Lebanon
Lesotho
Liberia
Libya
| Liechtenstein | Schatzkammer Liechtenstein, Vaduz | | | | |
Luxembourg
Madagascar
Malawi
| Malaysia | Natural History Museum, Putrajaya | | | | |
| Maldives | National Museum, Male | | | | |
Mali
| Malta | Gozo Museum | | | | |
Mauritania
| Mauritius | National History Museum, Mahebourg | | | | |
| Mexico | Universum, Museo de las Ciencias, Mexico City | | | | |
Monaco
Mongolia
Morocco
Muscat and Oman
Nauru
| Nepal | National Museum of Nepal, Kathmandu | | | | |
| Netherlands (Dutch) | National Museum of the History of Science and Medicine, Leiden | | | | |
| New Zealand | Museum of New Zealand | | | | |
Nicaragua
Niger
Nigeria
| Norway | Trondheim Science Museum | Natural History Museum at the University of Oslo | | | |
Pakistan
Panama
Paraguay
Peru
Philippines
| Poland | Olsztyńskie Planetarium i Obserwatorium Astronomiczne, Olsztyn | | | | |
Portugal
| Romania | Muzeul Naţional de Istorie a României, Bucharest | | | | |
| Rwanda | | Kandt House Museum of Natural History, Kigali | | | |
San Marino
Saudi Arabia
Senegal
| Sierra Leone | Sierra Leone National Museum, Freetown | | | | |
| Singapore | Singapore Science Centre | | | | |
| Solomon Islands | | National Museum | | | |
Somalia
| South Africa | Old Parliament Bldg., Cape Town | Transvaal Museum, Pretoria | | | |
Southern Yemen
| Soviet Union | Memorial Museum of Cosmonautics, Moscow | | | | |
| Spain | | Museo Naval, Madrid | | | |
Sudan
Swaziland
| Sweden | | National Museum of Science and Technology, Stockholm | | | |
| Switzerland | Swiss Federal Institute of Technology, Zurich | Swiss Museum of Transport, Lucerne | | | |
Syria
| Taiwan | National Museum of Natural Science, Taichung | | | | |
Tanzania
Thailand
Togo
Trinidad and Tobago
Tunisia
| Turkey | | Natural History Museum, Ankara | | | |
Uganda
| United Kingdom | Waiting area, 10 Downing Street, London | Natural History Museum, LondonNational Space Centre, Leicester | | | |
Upper Volta
| Uruguay | Boiso Lanza Air Base | | | | |
| Vatican City | Vatican Museum | Vatican Observatory | | | |
Venezuela
Vietnam
Yemen
| Yugoslavia | Museum of Yugoslav History, Belgrad | | | | |
Zambia.
United Nations

== See also ==
- Apollo 11 goodwill messages (Messages by nations left on the Moon)
- Stolen and missing Moon rocks
