= Yoshiokaite =

Mineral discovered by the Apollo 14 crew

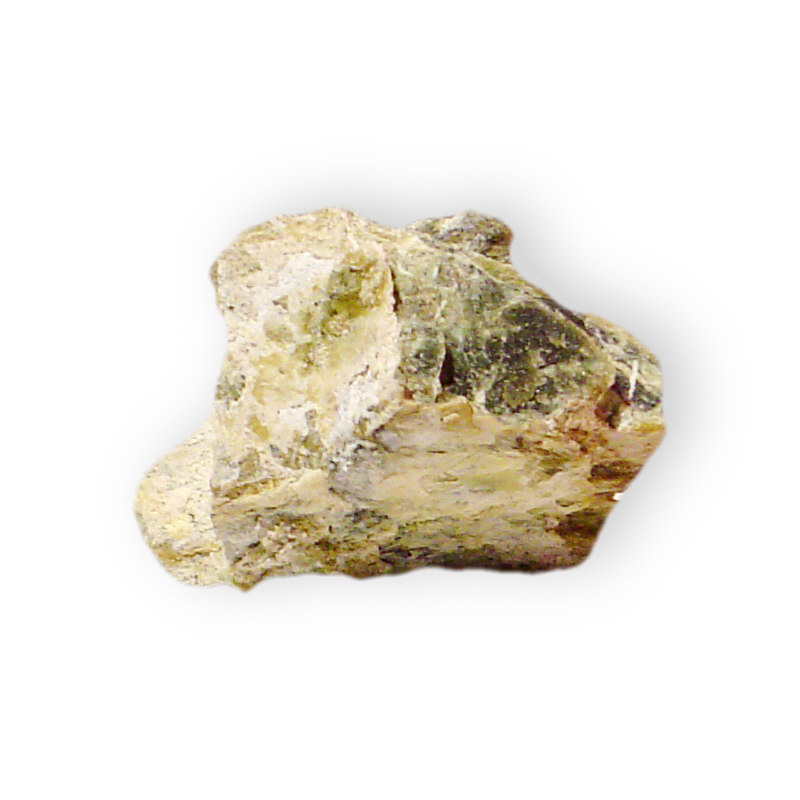

General
- Category: Tectosilicate
- Formula: (Ca_{8-(x/2)}[]_{x/2}Al_{16-x}Si_{x}O_{32})
- IMA symbol: Yos
- Strunz classification: 8/J.02-60
- Crystal system: Trigonal
- Crystal class: Rhombohedral (3̅) (same H-M symbol)
- Space group: P3̅
- Unit cell: a = 9.939 Å,c = 8.254 Å

Identification
- Color: Colorless
- Crystal habit: Devitrified glass
- Cleavage: Poor on {101}
- Luster: Vitreous
- Streak: white
- Optical properties: Uniaxial positive
- Birefringence: δ=0.060

Yoshiokaite, a mineral formed as shocked crystal fragments in devitrified glass, was discovered in lunar regolith breccia collected from a trench by the Apollo 14 crew in 1971. Although there have been other minerals (armalcolite and tranquillityite) that have been originally discovered on the Moon, yoshiokaite is the first new mineral with origin related to lunar highlands. Yoshiokaite is considered to be a member of the feldspathoid group.

Yoshiokaite was named after mineralogist, Takashi Yoshioka, who synthesized a metastable phase solid solution between $\ce{CaAl2Si2O8}$ and $\ce{CaAl2O4}$ with a nepheline-like structure and formula. Yoshioka's research on the synthetic phase helped understand the probable origins of the mineral. Yoshiokaite was approved as a mineral in 1989 by the Commission on New Minerals and Mineral Names of the International Mineralogical Association.

== Occurrence ==
The regolith breccia, sample 14076, containing the small crystals of yoshiokaite was collected at the bottom of a 30-cm-deep trench about 224 m from the Apollo landing site, Fra Mauro Base. Sample 14076 was described as having two distinct parts, the regolith breccia that was common of the local Apollo 14 regolith and the unknown part (called exotic) that was very high in Al with a very small ratio of fine-grained iron metal to ferrous oxide suggesting that it is from an older unknown regolith. The exotic portion of sample 14076 is described having the composition of glass that has undergone devitrification which is considered to be uncommon with glasses found elsewhere on the Moon. The devitrified glass may be caused by shock melting of anorthite. The anorthositic percentage of yoshiokaite along with remote-sensing evidence adds to the suggestion that there are pure anorthositic crusts common on the Moon. Unfortunately, the purest anorthositic crust is found on the far side of the Moon.

== Physical properties ==
Yoshiokaite is a colorless, transparent mineral with a vitreous luster and white streak. It is hexagonal, although most crystals found in the regolith breccia are distorted due to strain, likely from shock impact. Its crystals are characterized by having poor cleavage along {100}. Devitrified glasses with 30 wt% $\ce{SiO2}$ or less have interlocking crystals that are angular and anhedral with no preferred orientation up to 235 $\mu m$ in size. Devitrified glass with 34 wt% $\ce{SiO2}$ are spherical with positive elongation fibers and plumose crystals with inclined extinction. Shock-induced lamellae sets at {201} and {200}.

== Crystallography properties ==
Yoshiokaite has a trigonal crystal system with either a $P3$ and$P\bar{3}$ space group. Crystal cell parameters are a = 9.939 Å and c = 8.245 Å (ratio a:c = 1:0.83), The unit cell volume is equal to 705.35 Å. It is uniaxial positive with refractive index values $n_\omega$= 1.560 - 1.580 and $n_\varepsilon$= 1.620 - 1.640 with a max birefringence of $\delta$= 0.060 and a moderate surface relief.

Powder X-Ray Diffraction data:

d-spacing	Intensity
8.57 Å	(100)
2.979 Å	(91)
3.718 Å	(79)
2.871 Å	(78)
1.158 Å	(51)
2.062 Å	(41)
4.123 Å	(36)

== Chemical properties ==
Crystals and devitrified glass that are high in silica (>34 wt% $\ce{SiO2}$) form plumose or spherical crystals that are enriched in Al and Si but are lower in content of Mg, Fe, and Ti. Lower silica crystals and glasses (30 wt% - 27 wt% $\ce{SiO2}$) are enriched in Ca but have lower contents of Mg, Al, and Si. Devitrified glass with less than 27 wt.% $\ce{SiO2}$ show varied chemistry in intergranular regions although these regions are generally very small (<0.5 $\mu m$). Yoshiokaite's chemical content can be represented on a $\ce{CaO-Al2O3-SiO2}$ ternary diagram.

== See also ==
- List of minerals
