= Moon rock =

Rocks on or from the Moon

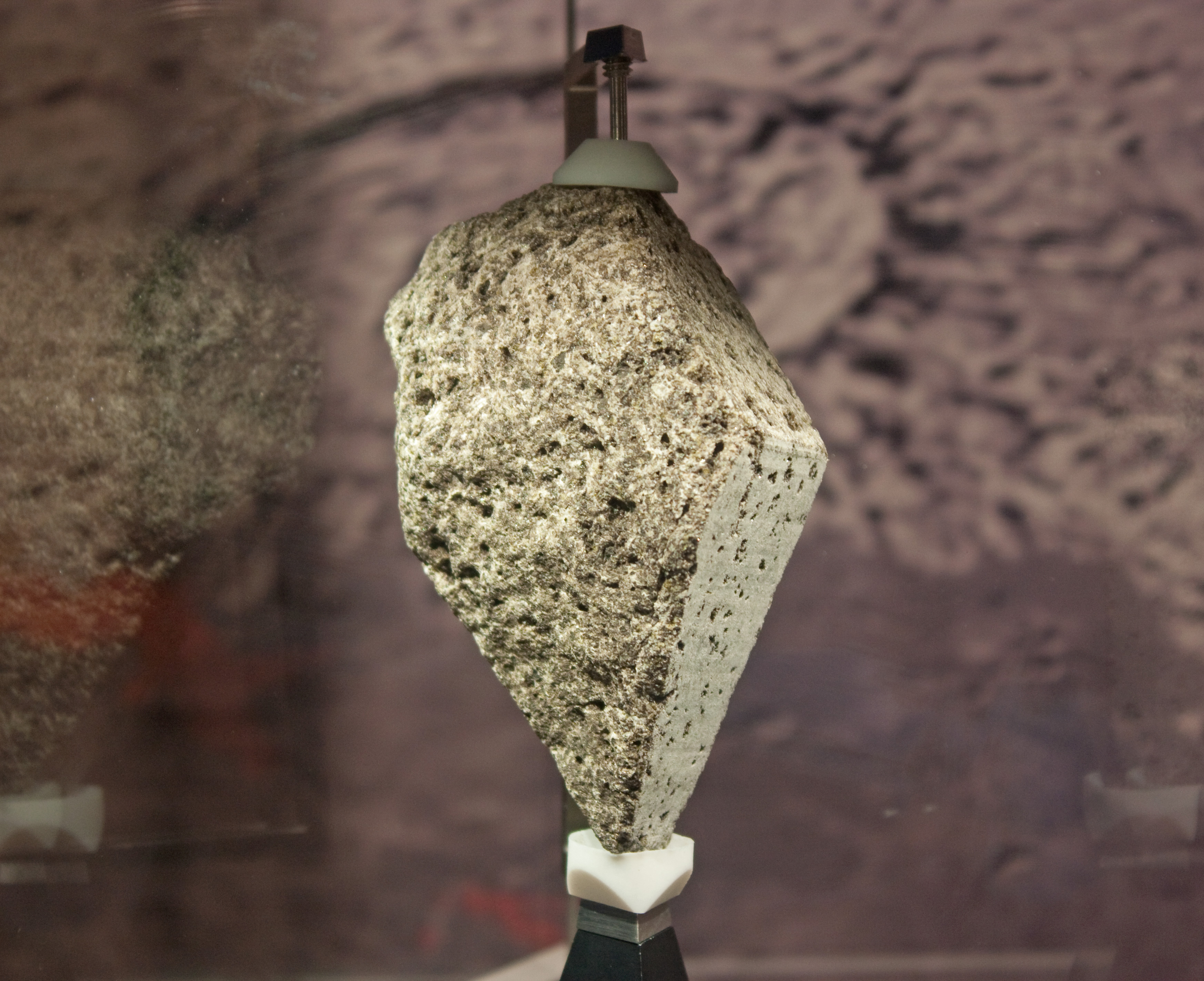
Olivine basalt collected from the rim of Hadley Rille in 1971 by the crew of Apollo 15

Moon rock or lunar rock is rock originating from Earth's Moon. This includes lunar material collected during the course of human exploration of the Moon, and rock that has been ejected naturally from the Moon's surface and landed on Earth as lunar meteorites.

== Sources ==
Moon rocks on Earth come from four sources: those collected by six United States Apollo program crewed lunar landings from 1969 to 1972; those collected by three Soviet uncrewed Luna probes in the 1970s; those collected by the Chinese Lunar Exploration Program's uncrewed probes; and rocks that were ejected naturally from the lunar surface before falling to Earth as lunar meteorites.

=== Apollo program ===
Six Apollo missions collected 2,200 samples of material weighing 381 kilograms (840 lb) through the use of the Apollo Lunar Sample Return Container, and processed into more than 110,000 individually cataloged samples.

Mission	Site	Sample mass returned	Year
Apollo 11	Mare Tranquillitatis	21.55 kg (47.51 lb)	1969
Apollo 12	Ocean of Storms	34.30 kg (75.62 lb)	1969
Apollo 14	Fra Mauro formation	42.80 kg (94.35 lb)	1971
Apollo 15	Hadley–Apennine	76.70 kg (169.10 lb)	1971
Apollo 16	Descartes Highlands	95.20 kg (209.89 lb)	1972
Apollo 17	Taurus–Littrow	110.40 kg (243.40 lb)	1972

=== Luna program ===
Three Luna spacecraft returned with a total of 301 grams (10.6 oz) of samples.

Mission	Site	Sample mass returned	Year
Luna 16	Mare Fecunditatis	101 g (3.6 oz)	1970
Luna 20	Mare Fecunditatis	30 g (1.1 oz)	1972
Luna 24	Mare Crisium	170 g (6.0 oz)	1976

The Soviet Union abandoned its attempts at a crewed lunar program in the 1970s, but succeeded in landing three robotic Luna spacecraft with the capability to collect and return small samples to Earth. A combined total of less than half a kilogram of material was returned.

In 1993, three small rock fragments from Luna 16, weighing 200 mg, were sold for US$ 442,500 at Sotheby's (equivalent to $986,221 in 2025). In 2018, the same three Luna 16 rock fragments sold for US$ 855,000 at Sotheby's (equivalent to $1,096,226 in 2025).

=== Chang'e missions ===
Mission	Site	Sample mass returned	Year
Chang'e 5	Mons Rümker	1,731 g (3.8 lb)	2020
Chang'e 6	Southern Apollo crater	1,935.3 g (4.3 lb)	2024

In 2020, Chang'e 5, the fifth lunar exploration mission of the Chinese Lunar Exploration Program, returned approximately 1,731 g (61.1 oz) of rocks and dust from the Oceanus Procellarum, (the Ocean of Storms), the largest dark region on the Moon, visible on the western edge. The Chang'e-5 samples contain 'perplexing combination' of minerals and include the sixth new lunar mineral, named Changesite-(Y). This phosphate mineral characterized by colorless, transparent columnar crystals. Researchers estimated the peak pressure (11-40 GPa) and impact duration (0.1-1.0 second) of the collision that shaped the sample. Using shock wave models, they estimated the resulting crater to be between 3 and 32 kilometers wide, depending on the impact angle.

The follow-up mission to Chang'e 5, Chang'e 6, reached the Moon on May 8, 2024, and entered lunar orbit for 20 days to find an appropriate landing site. On 1 June 2024, the lander separated from the orbiter and landed on a mare unit at the southern part of the Apollo crater (36.1°S, 208.3°E). The mission objective was to collect about 2 kg of material from the far side of the Moon and bring it back to Earth. The Chang'e-6 probe withstood the high temperatures and collected the samples by drilling into the Moon's surface and scooping soil and rocks with a mechanical arm, according to a statement from the China National Space Administration (CNSA). The samples were placed in the ascent vehicle, which docked with the Chang'e 6 orbiter-return vehicle on June 6, 2024 China's Chang'e 6 lunar probe, carrying the first lunar rocks ever collected from the far side of the Moon, landed in China's Inner Mongolia region on June 25, 2024.

=== Lunar meteorites ===
More than 370 lunar meteorites have been collected on Earth, representing more than 30 different meteorite finds (no falls), with a total mass of over 1,090 kilograms (2,400 lb). Some were discovered by scientific teams (such as ANSMET) searching for meteorites in Antarctica, with most of the remainder discovered by collectors in the desert regions of northern Africa and Oman. A Moon rock known as "NWA 12691", which weighs 13.5 kilograms (30 lb), was found in the Sahara Desert at the Algerian and Mauritanian borders in January 2017, and went on sale for $2.5 million in 2020.

== Dating ==
Rocks from the Moon have been measured by radiometric dating techniques. They range in age from about 3.16 billion years old for the basaltic samples derived from the lunar maria, up to about 4.44 billion years old for rocks derived from the highlands. Based on the age-dating technique of "crater counting," the youngest basaltic eruptions are believed to have occurred about 1.2 billion years ago, but scientists do not possess samples of these lavas. In contrast, the oldest ages of rocks from the Earth are between 3.8 and 4.28 billion years.

== Composition ==
Common lunar minerals
Mineral	Elements	Lunar rock appearance
Plagioclase feldspar	Calcium (Ca); Aluminium (Al); Silicon (Si); Oxygen (O)	White to transparent gray; usually as elongated grains.
Pyroxene	Iron (Fe), Magnesium (Mg); Calcium (Ca); Silicon (Si); Oxygen (O)	Maroon to black; the grains appear more elongated in the maria and more square in the highlands.
Olivine	Iron (Fe); Magnesium (Mg); Silicon (Si); Oxygen (O)	Greenish color; generally, it appears in a rounded shape.
Ilmenite	Iron (Fe), Titanium (Ti); Oxygen (O)	Black, elongated square crystals.

Moon rocks fall into two main categories: those found in the lunar highlands (terrae), and those in the maria. The terrae consist dominantly of mafic plutonic rocks. Regolith breccias with similar protoliths are also common. Mare basalts come in three distinct series in direct relation to their titanium content: high-Ti basalts, low-Ti basalts, and Very Low-Ti (VLT) basalts.

Almost all lunar rocks are depleted in volatiles and are completely lacking in hydrated minerals common in Earth rocks. In some regards, lunar rocks are closely related to Earth's rocks in their isotopic composition of the element oxygen. The Apollo Moon rocks were collected using a variety of tools, including hammers, rakes, scoops, tongs, and core tubes. Most were photographed prior to collection to record the condition in which they were found. They were placed inside sample bags and then a Special Environmental Sample Container for return to the Earth to protect them from contamination. In contrast to the Earth, large portions of the lunar crust appear to be composed of rocks with high concentrations of the mineral anorthite. The mare basalts have relatively high iron values. Furthermore, some of the mare basalts have very high levels of titanium (in the form of ilmenite).

=== Highlands rocks ===
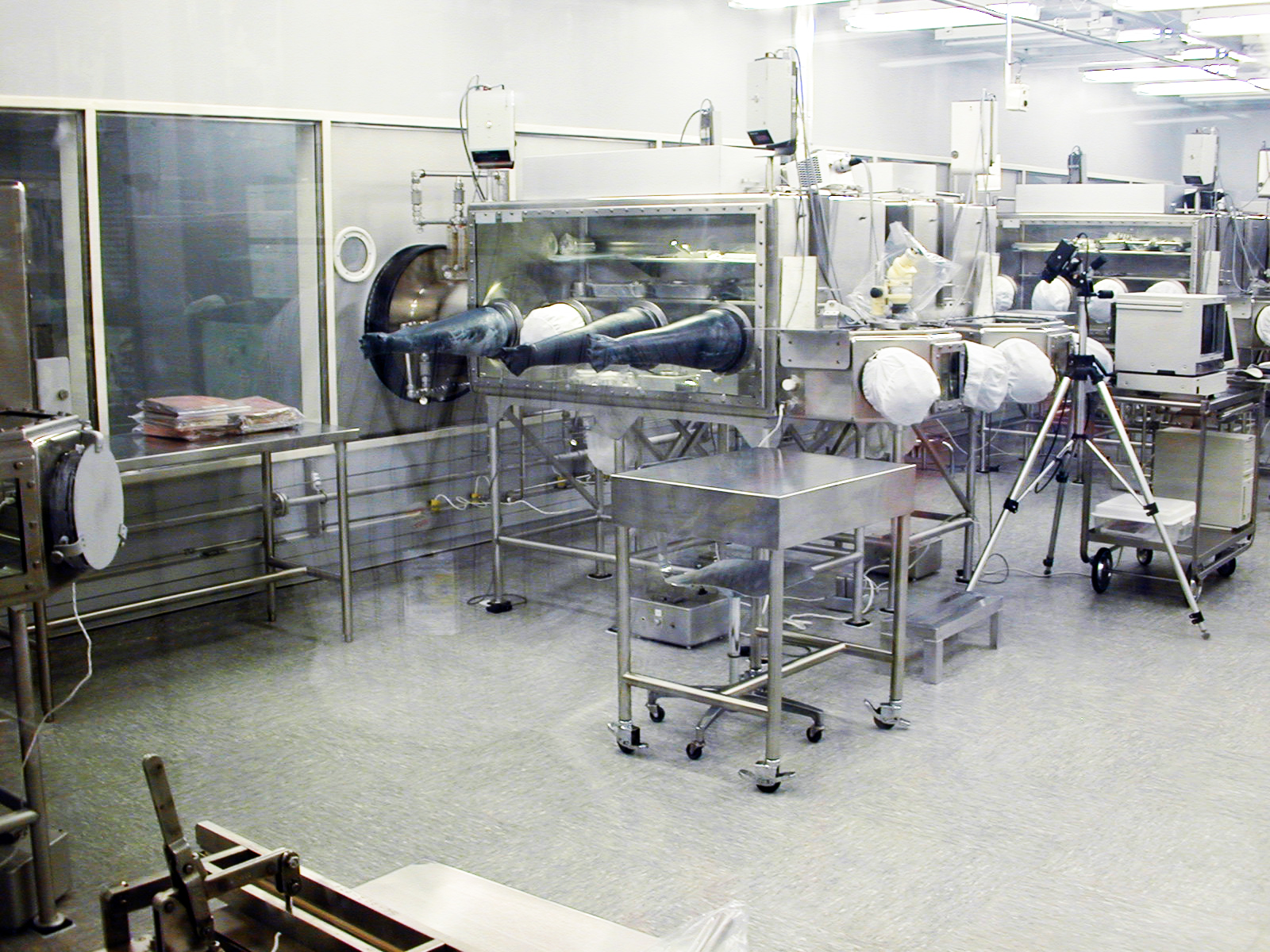
Processing facility in Lunar Sample Building at JSC

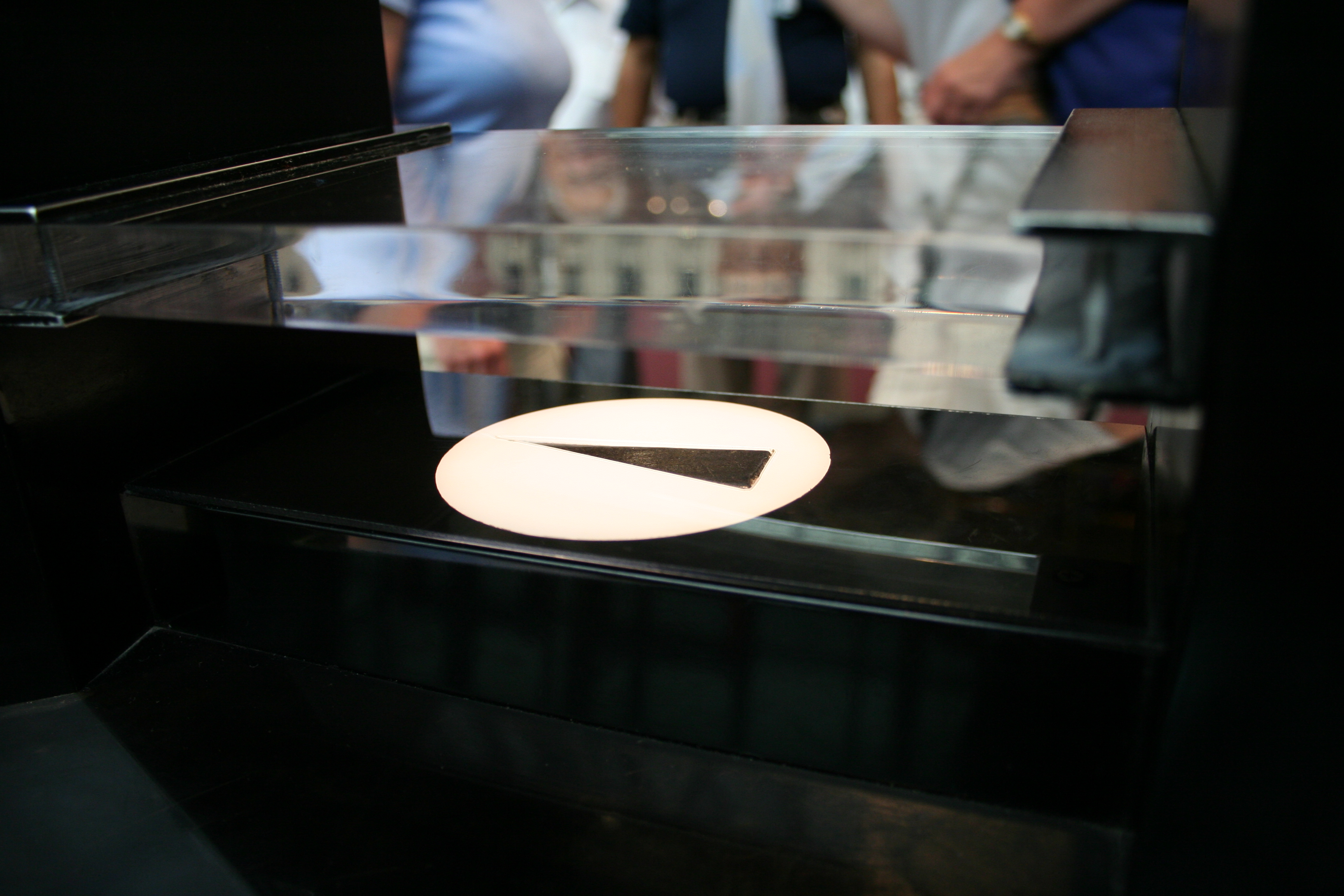
Slice of Moon rock at the National Air and Space Museum in Washington, DC

Mineral composition of Highland rocks
	Plagioclase	Pyroxene	Olivine	Ilmenite
Anorthosite	90%	5%	5%	0%
Norite	60%	35%	5%	0%
Troctolite	60%	5%	35%	0%

Primary igneous rocks in the lunar highlands compose three distinct groups: the ferroan anorthosite suite, the magnesian suite, and the alkali suite.

Lunar breccias, formed largely by the immense basin-forming impacts, are dominantly composed of highland lithologies because most mare basalts post-date basin formation (and largely fill these impact basins).

- The ferroan anorthosite suite consists almost exclusively of the rock anorthosite (>90% calcic plagioclase) with less common anorthositic gabbro (70-80% calcic plagioclase, with minor pyroxene). The ferroan anorthosite suite is the most common group in the highlands, and is inferred to represent plagioclase flotation cumulates of the lunar magma ocean, with interstitial mafic phases formed from trapped interstitial melt or rafted upwards with the more abundant plagioclase framework. The plagioclase is extremely calcic by terrestrial standards, with molar anorthite contents of 94–96% (An94–96). This reflects the extreme depletion of the bulk Moon in alkalis (Na, K) as well as water and other volatile elements. In contrast, the mafic minerals in this suite have low Mg/Fe ratios that are inconsistent with calcic plagioclase compositions. Ferroan anorthosites have been dated using the internal isochron method at circa 4.4 Ga.
- The magnesian suite (or "Mg-suite") consists of dunites (>90% olivine), troctolites (olivine-plagioclase), and gabbros (plagioclase-pyroxene) with relatively high Mg/Fe ratios in the mafic minerals and a range of plagioclase compositions that are still generally calcic (An86–93). These rocks represent later intrusions into the highlands crust (ferroan anorthosite) at round 4.3–4.1 Ga. An interesting aspect of this suite is that analysis of the trace element content of plagioclase and pyroxene requires equilibrium with a KREEP-rich magma, despite the refractory major element contents.
- The alkali suite is so-called because of its high alkali content—for Moon rocks. The alkali suite consists of alkali anorthosites with relatively sodic plagioclase (An70–85), norites (plagioclase-orthopyroxene), and gabbronorites (plagioclase-clinopyroxene-orthopyroxene) with similar plagioclase compositions and mafic minerals more iron-rich than the magnesian suite. The trace element content of these minerals also indicates a KREEP-rich parent magma. The alkali suite spans an age range similar to the magnesian suite.
- Lunar granites are relatively rare rocks that include diorites, monzodiorites, and granophyres. They consist of quartz, plagioclase, orthoclase or alkali feldspar, rare mafics (pyroxene), and rare zircon. The alkali feldspar may have unusual compositions unlike any terrestrial feldspar, and they are often Ba-rich. These rocks apparently form by the extreme fractional crystallization of magnesian suite or alkali suite magmas, although liquid immiscibility may also play a role. U-Pb date of zircons from these rocks and from lunar soils have ages of 4.1–4.4 Ga, more or less the same as the magnesian suite and alkali suite rocks. In the 1960s, NASA researcher John A. O'Keefe and others linked lunar granites with tektites found on Earth although many researchers refuted these claims. According to one study, a portion of lunar sample 12013 has a chemistry that closely resembles javanite tektites found on Earth.
- Lunar breccias range from glassy vitrophyre melt rocks, to glass-rich breccia, to regolith breccias. The vitrophyres are dominantly glassy rocks that represent impact melt sheets that fill large impact structures. They contain few clasts of the target lithology, which is largely melted by the impact. Glassy breccias form from impact melt that exit the crater and entrain large volumes of crushed (but not melted) ejecta. It may contain abundant clasts that reflect the range of lithologies in the target region, sitting in a matrix of mineral fragments plus glass that welds it all together. Some of the clasts in these breccias are pieces of older breccias, documenting a repeated history of impact brecciation, cooling, and impact. Regolith breccias resemble the glassy breccias but have little or no glass (melt) to weld them together. As noted above, the basin-forming impacts responsible for these breccias pre-date almost all mare basalt volcanism, so clasts of mare basalt are very rare. When found, these clasts represent the earliest phase of mare basalt volcanism preserved.

=== Mare basalts ===
Mineral composition of mare basalts
	Plagioclase	Pyroxene	Olivine	Ilmenite
High titanium content	30%	54%	3%	18%
Low titanium content	30%	60%	5%	5%
Very low titanium content	35%	55%	8%	2%

Mare basalts are named as such because they frequently constitute large portions of the lunar maria. These typically contain 18–21 percent FeO by weight, and 1–13 percent TiO_{2}. They are similar to terrestrial basalts, but have many important differences; for example, mare basalts show a large negative europium anomaly. The type location is Mare Crisium sampled by Luna 24.

- KREEP Basalts (and borderline VHK (Very High K) basalts) have extraordinary potassium content. These contain 13–16 percent Al_{2}O_{3}, 9–15 percent FeO, and are enriched in magnesium and incompatible elements (potassium, phosphorus and rare earth elements) 100–150 times compared to ordinary chondrite meteorites. These are commonly encountered around the Oceanus Procellarum, and are identified in remote sensing by their high (about 10 ppm) thorium contents. Most of incompatible elements in KREEP basalts are incorporated in the grains of the phosphate minerals apatite and merrillite.

== Curation and availability ==
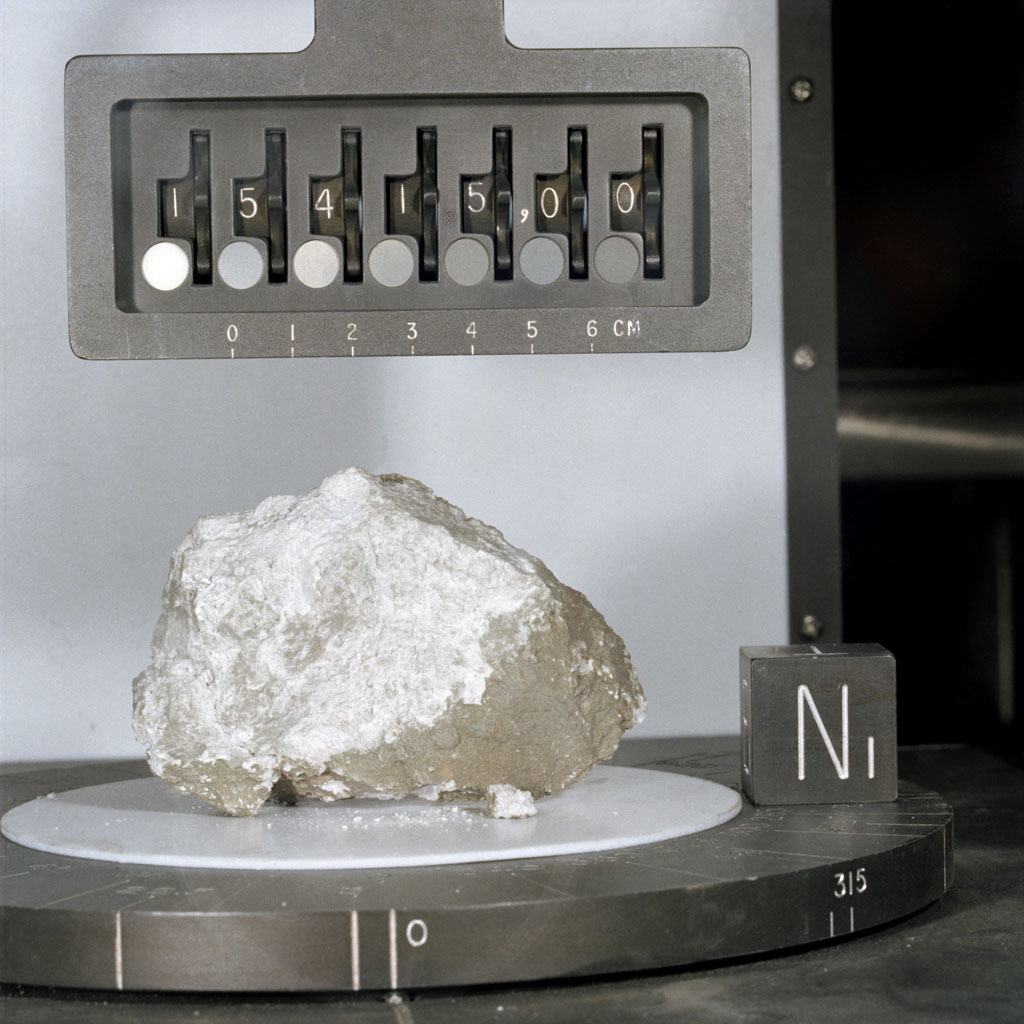
Genesis Rock returned by the Apollo 15 mission

The main repository for the Apollo Moon rocks is the Lunar Sample Laboratory Facility at the Lyndon B. Johnson Space Center in Houston, Texas. For safekeeping, there is also a smaller collection stored at White Sands Test Facility in Las Cruces, New Mexico. Most of the rocks are stored in nitrogen to keep them free of moisture. They are handled only indirectly, using special tools.

Some Moon rocks from the Apollo missions are displayed in museums, and a few allow visitors to touch them. One of these, called the Touch Rock, is displayed in the Smithsonian National Air and Space Museum in Washington, D.C. The idea of having touchable Moon rocks at a museum was suggested by Apollo scientist Farouk El-Baz, who was inspired by his childhood pilgrimage to Mecca where he touched the Black Stone (which in Islam is believed to be sent down from the heavens).

Moon rocks collected during the course of lunar exploration are currently considered priceless. In 2002, a safe was stolen from the Lunar Sample Building that contained minute samples of lunar and Martian material. The samples were recovered, and NASA estimated their value during the ensuing court case at about $1 million for 10 oz (280 g) of material.

Naturally transported Moon rocks in the form of lunar meteorites are sold and traded among private collectors.

== Goodwill Moon rocks ==
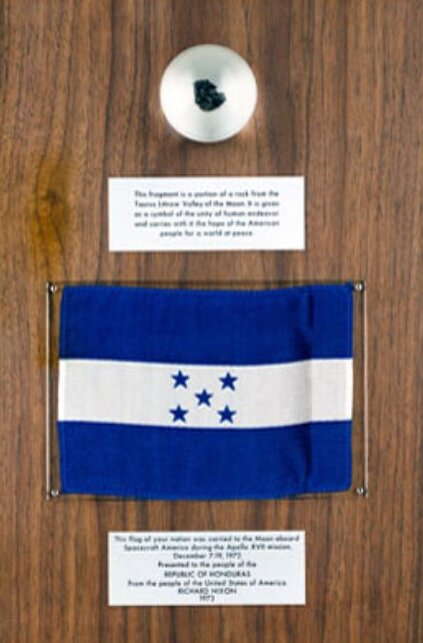
Honduras plaque

Apollo 17 astronauts Eugene Cernan and Harrison Schmitt picked up a rock "composed of many fragments, of many sizes, and many shapes, probably from all parts of the Moon". This rock was later labeled sample 70017. President Nixon ordered that fragments of that rock should be distributed in 1973 to all 50 US states and 135 foreign heads of state, as a goodwill gesture. The fragments were presented encased in an acrylic sphere, mounted on a wood plaque which included the recipients' flag which had also flown aboard Apollo 17. Many of the presentation Moon rocks are now unaccounted for, having been stolen or lost.

== Discoveries ==
Four minerals were discovered from the Moon: armalcolite, tranquillityite, pyroxferroite, and changesite-(Y). Armalcolite was named for the three astronauts on the Apollo 11 mission: Armstrong, Aldrin and Collins.

== Stolen and missing Moon rocks ==
Because of their rarity on Earth and the difficulty of obtaining more, Moon rocks have been frequent targets of theft and vandalism, and many have gone missing or were stolen.

== Gallery ==
A visitor touching a lunar sample at the Kennedy Space Center Visitor Complex

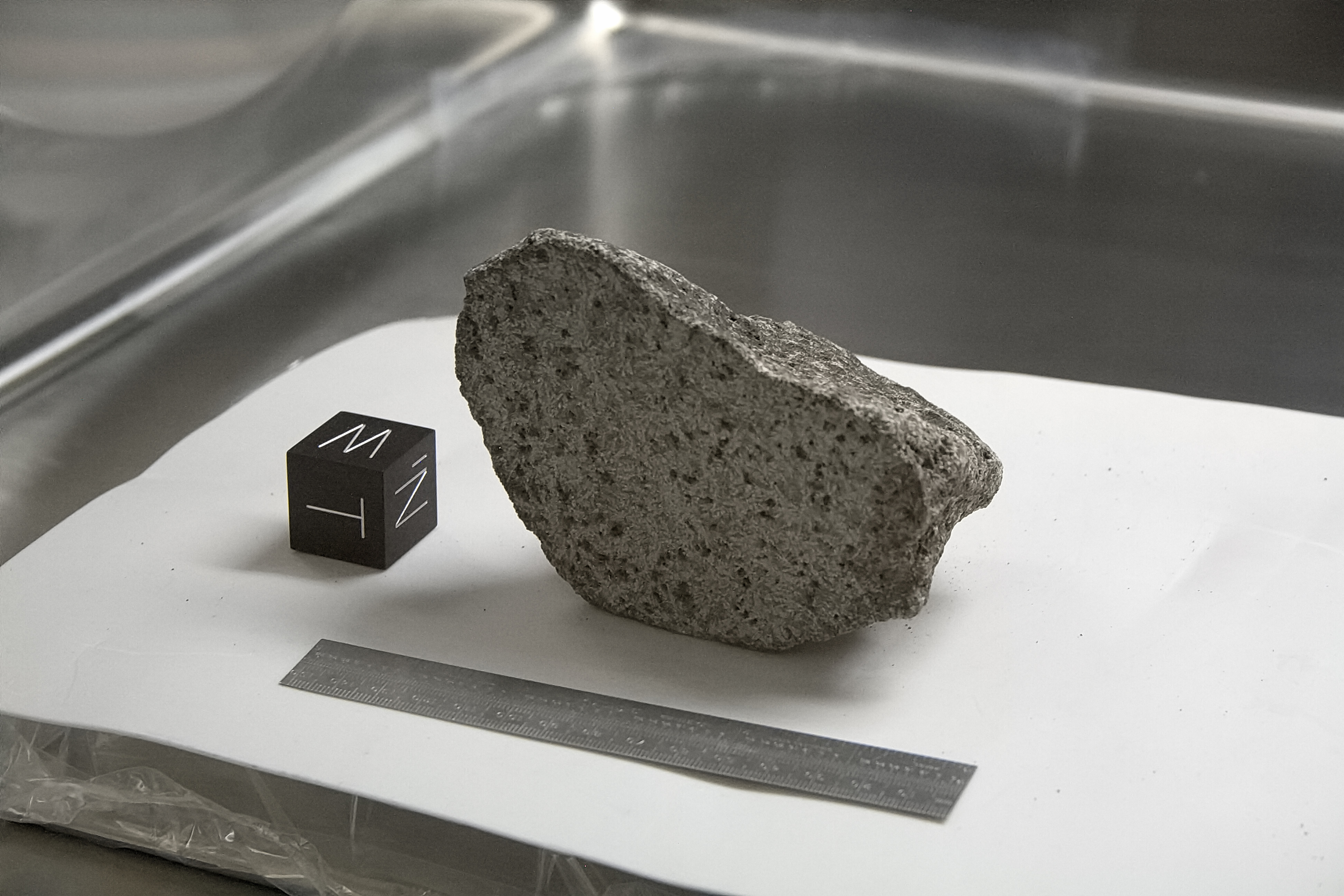
NASA Lunar sample 15555 on display at Space Center Houston Lunar Samples Vault, at NASA's Johnson Space Center

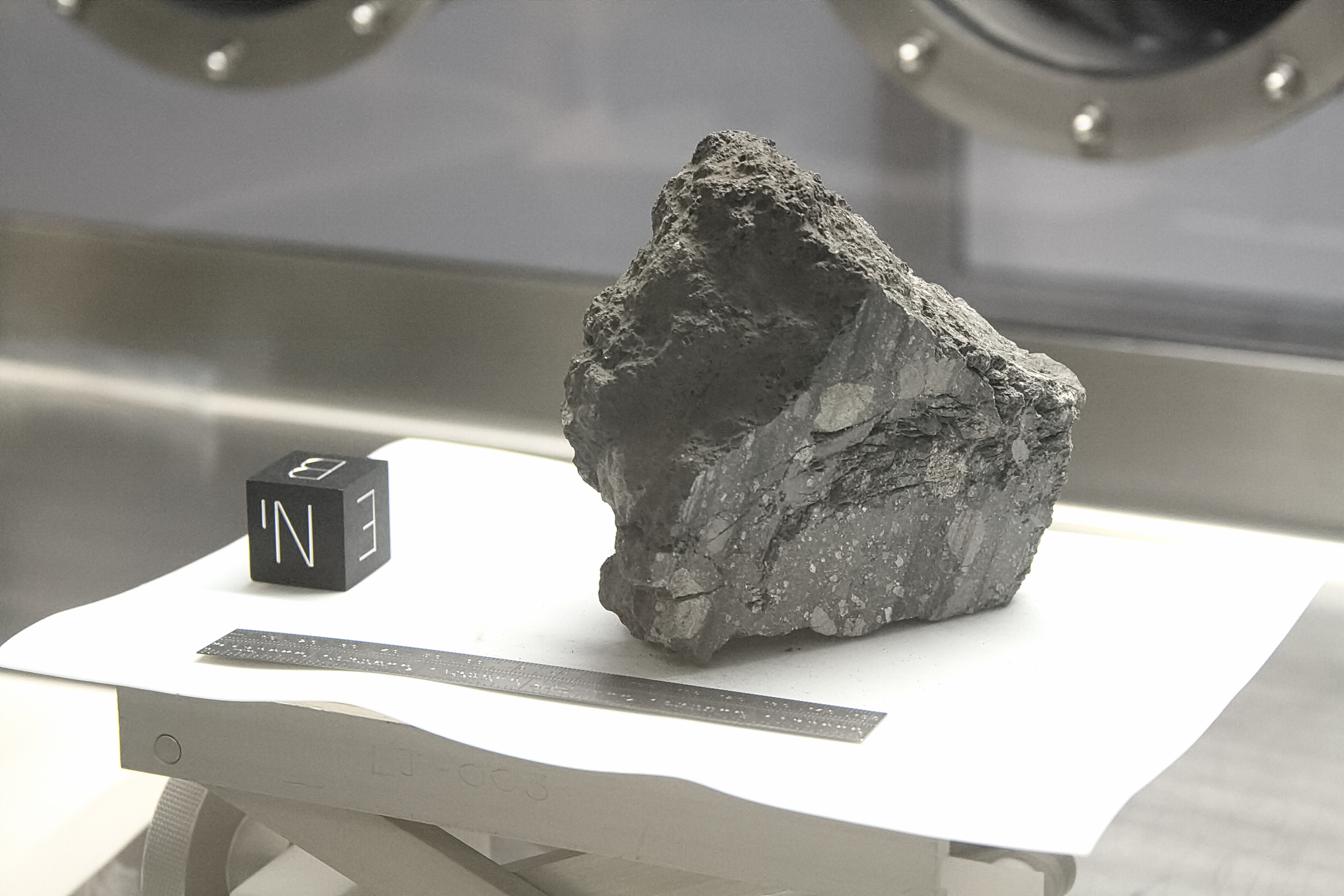
NASA Lunar sample 15498 on display at Space Center Houston Lunar Samples Vault, at NASA's Johnson Space Center

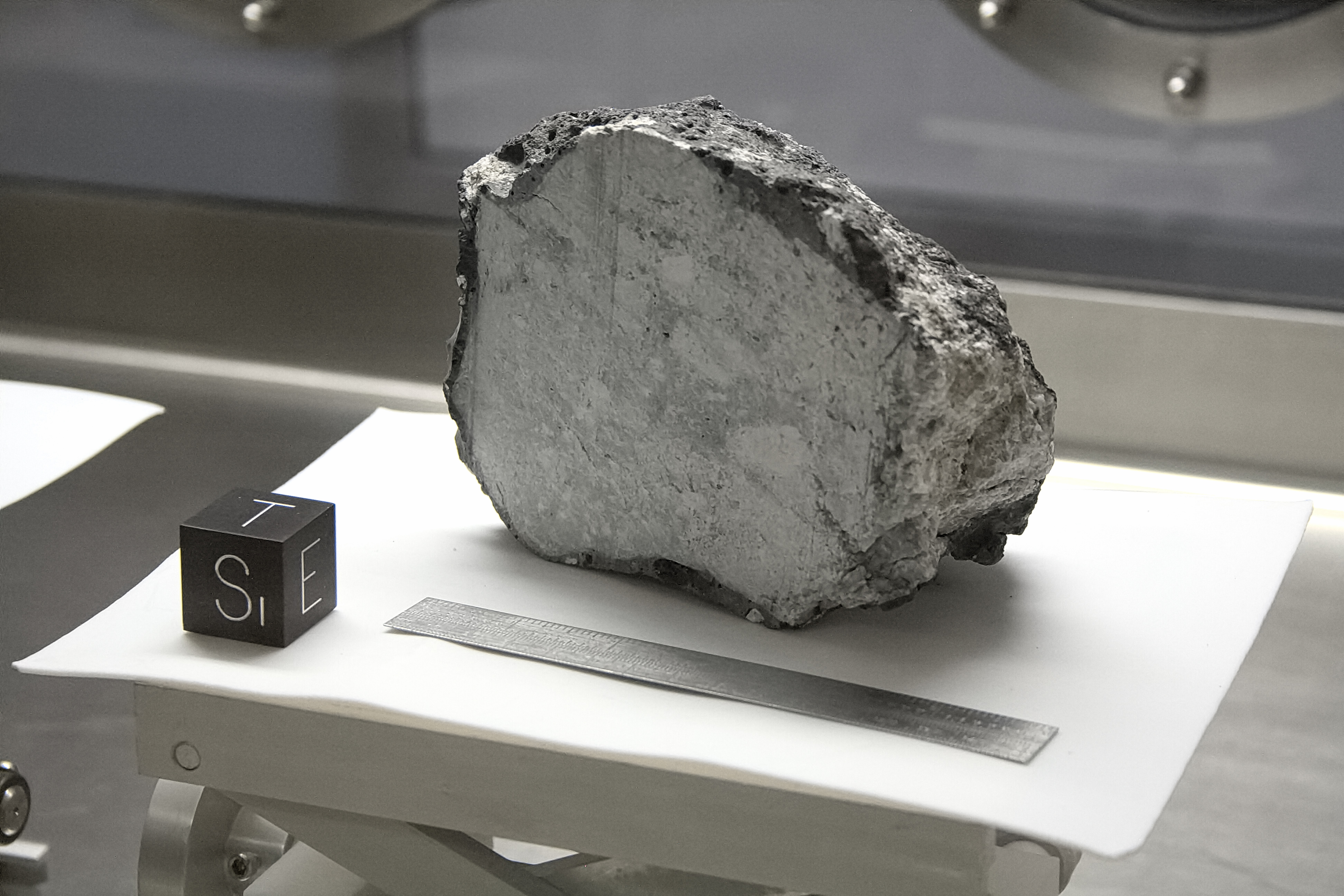
NASA Lunar sample 60015 on display at Space Center Houston Lunar Samples Vault, at NASA's Johnson Space Center

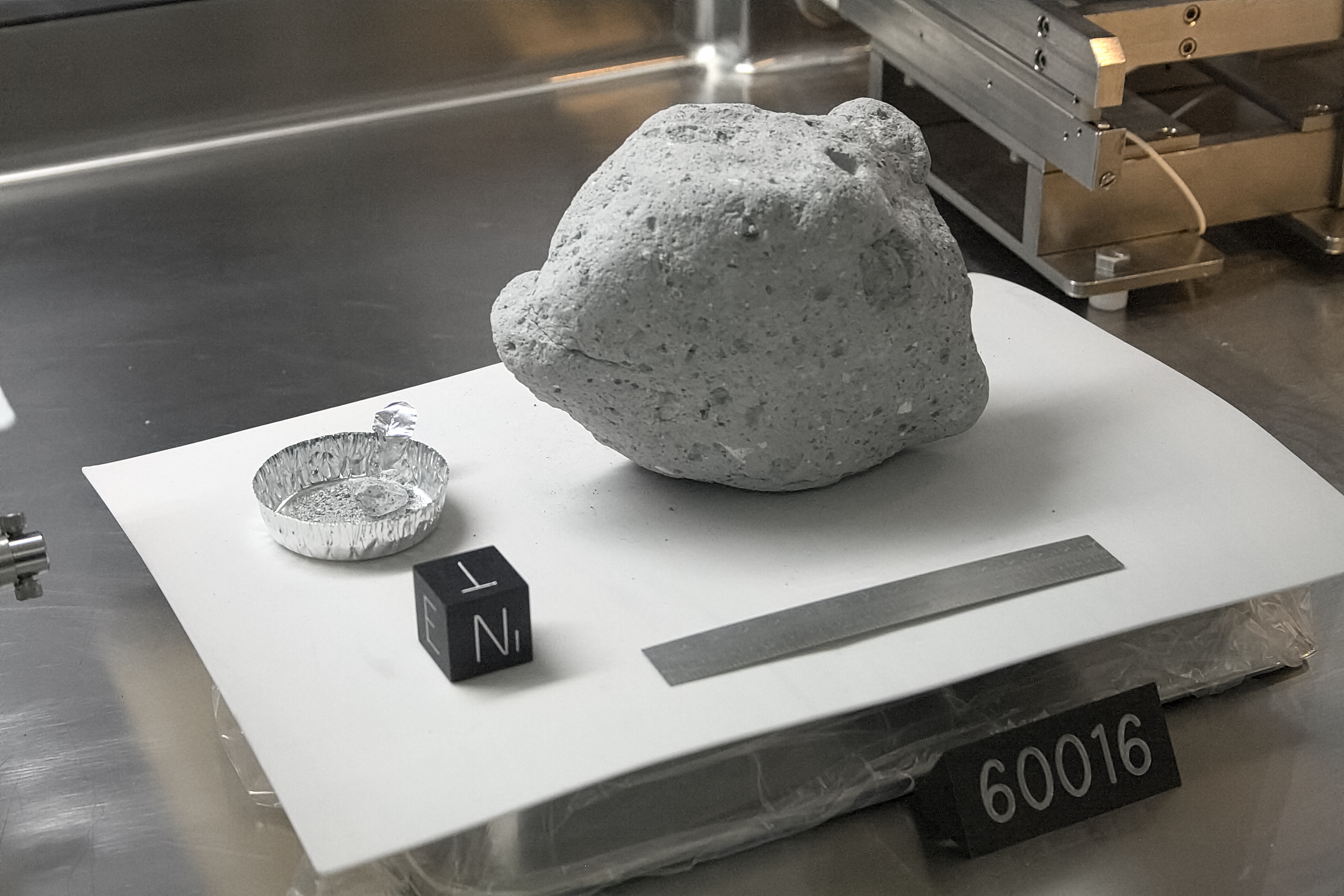
NASA Lunar sample 60016 on display at Space Center Houston Lunar Samples Vault, at NASA's Johnson Space Center

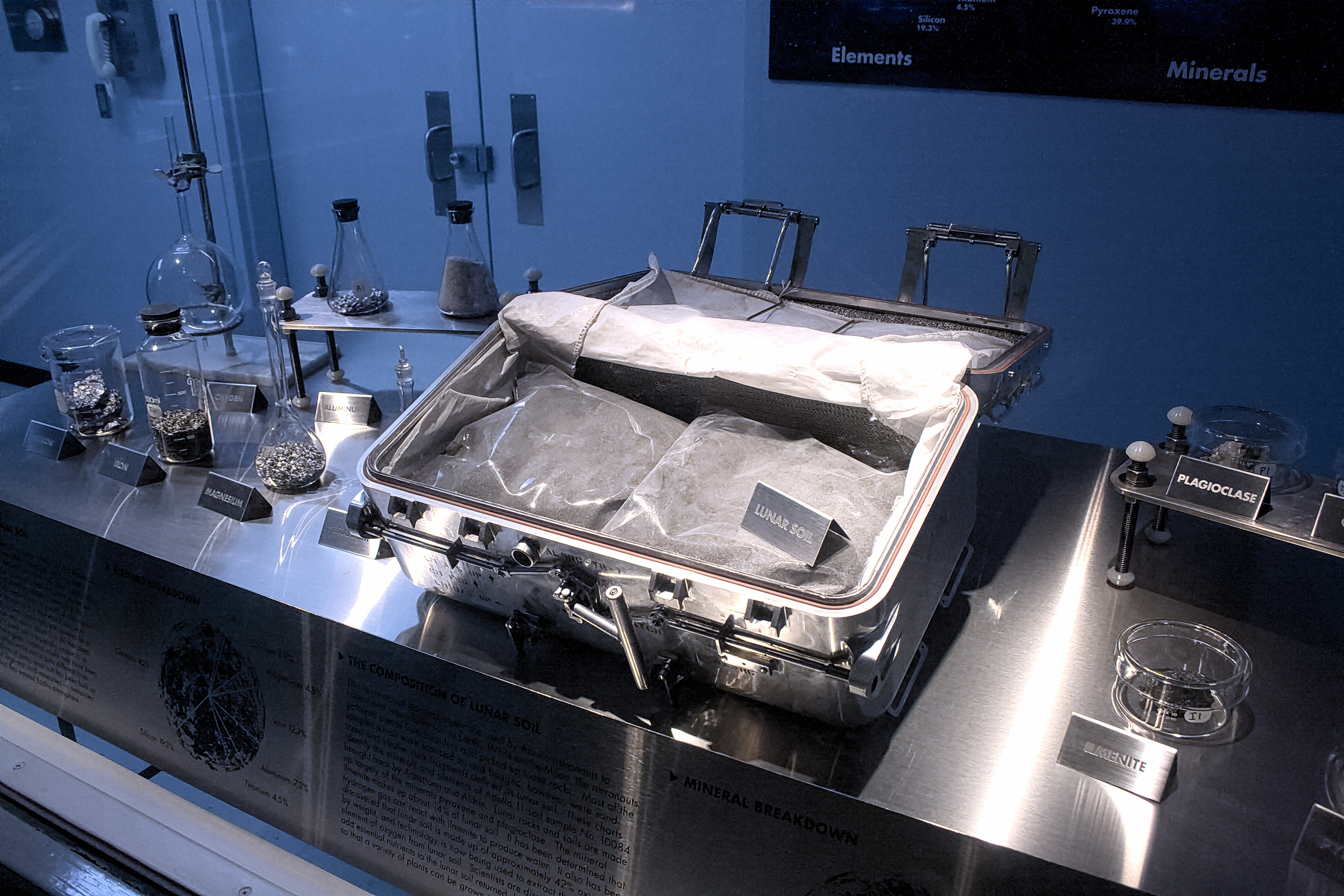
NASA Lunar Sample Return Container with Lunar soil on display at Space Center Houston Lunar Samples Vault, at NASA's Johnson Space Center

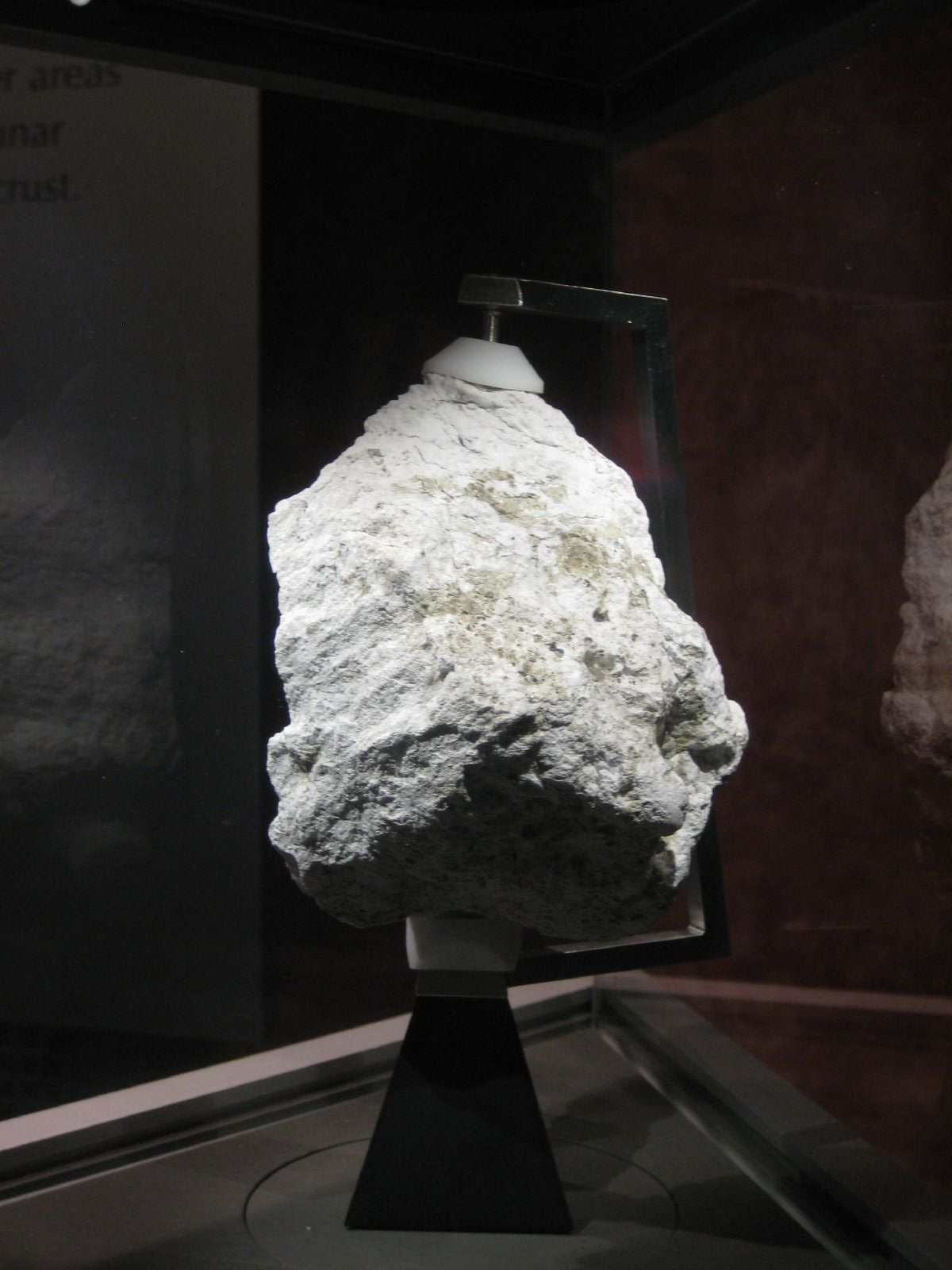
Lunar Ferroan Anorthosite #60025 (Plagioclase Feldspar). Collected by Apollo 16 from the Lunar Highlands near Descartes Crater. This sample is currently on display at the National Museum of Natural History in Washington, DC

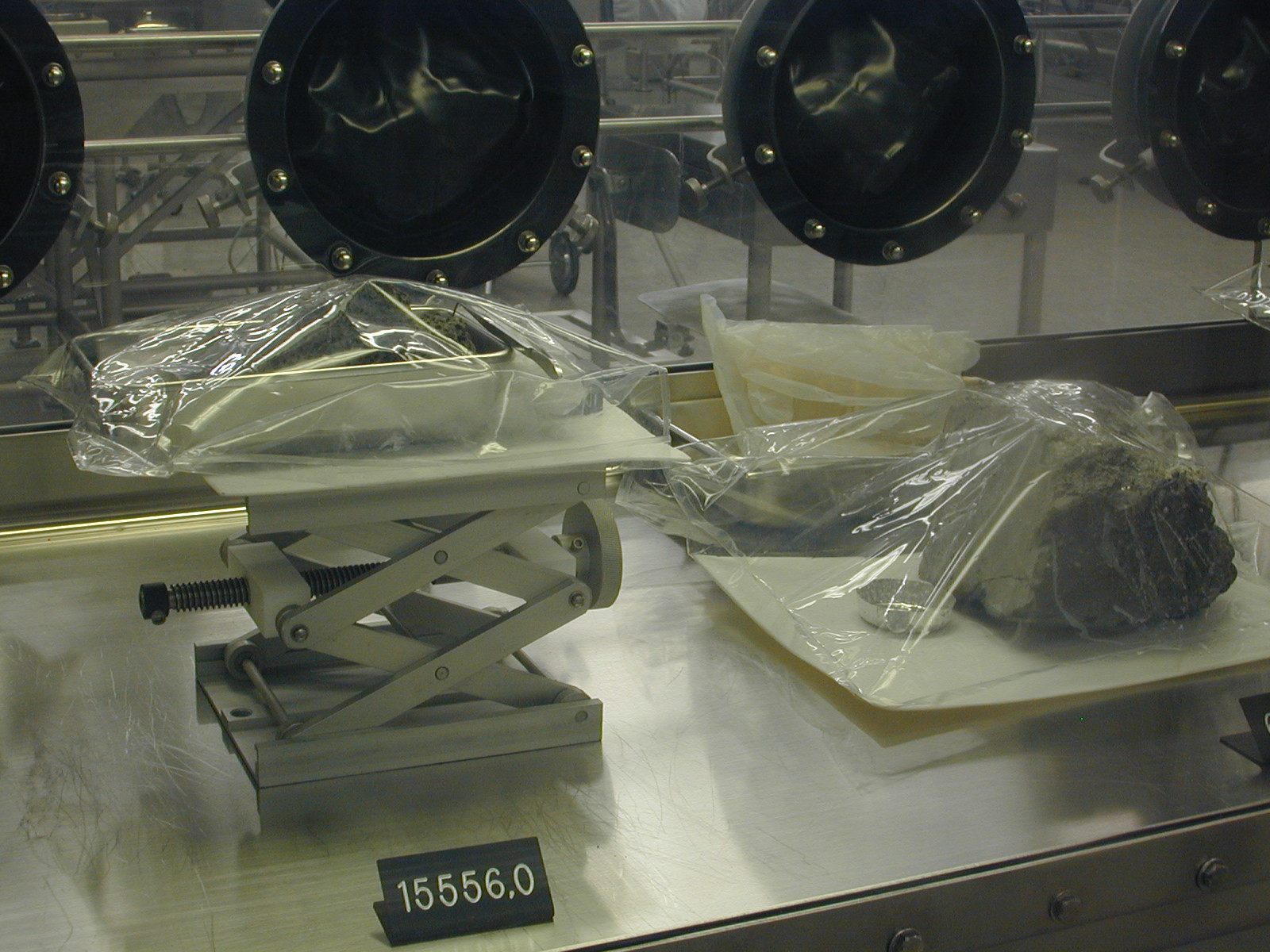
Samples in Lunar Sample Building at JSC

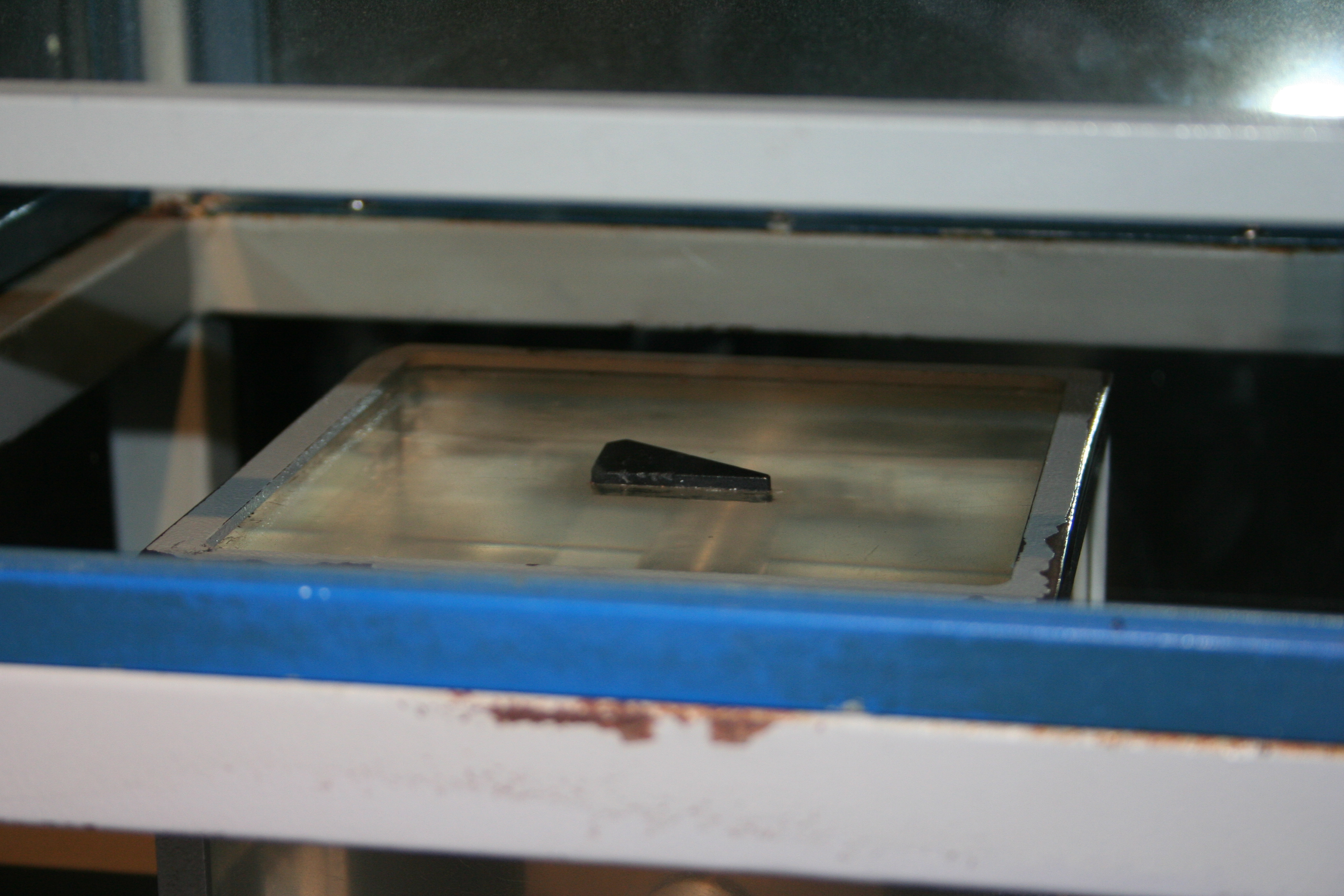
Moon rock on display for visitors to touch at the Apollo/Saturn V Center

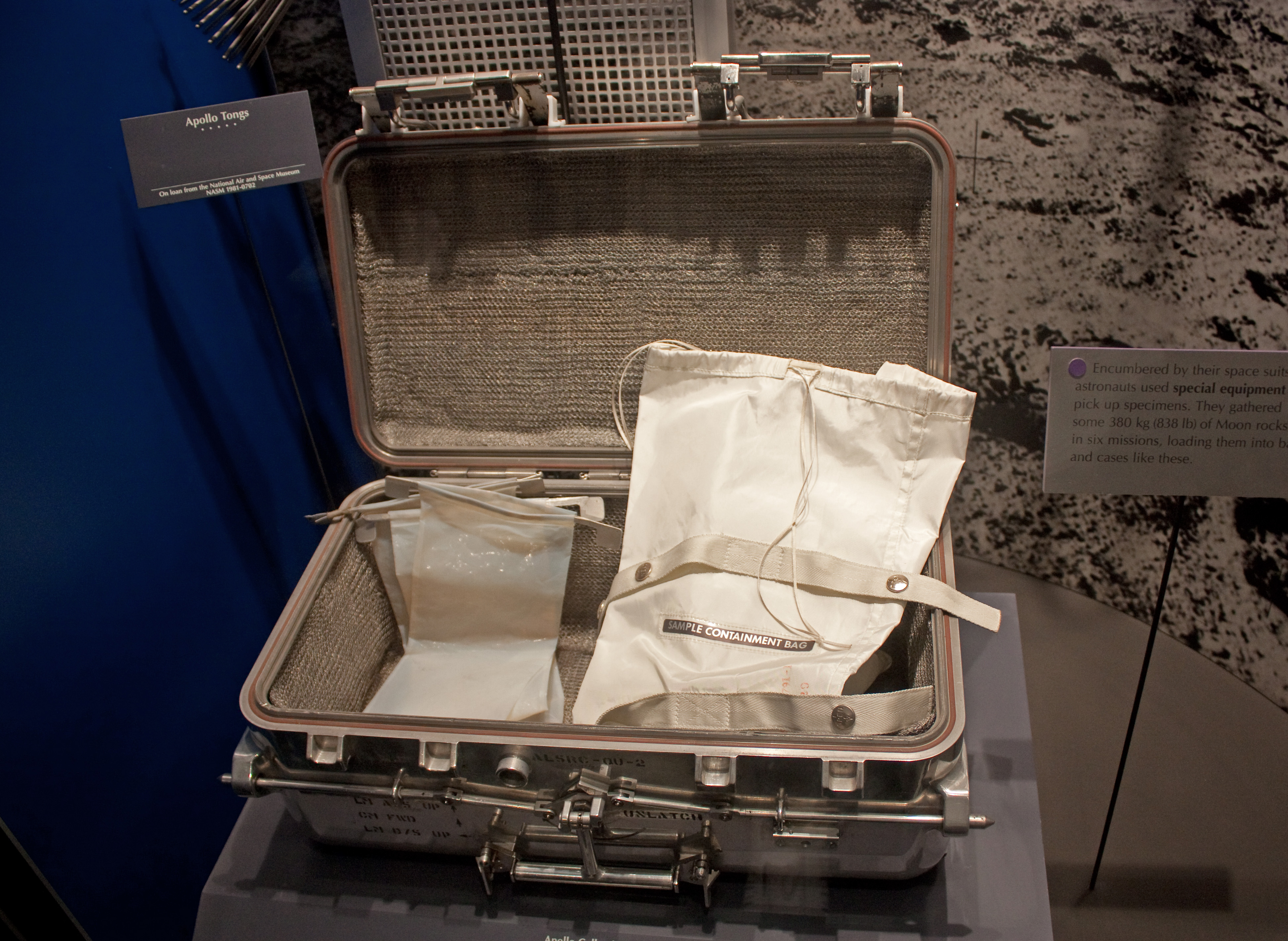
Sample collection case, containing collection bags for use on the surface, at the National Museum of Natural History

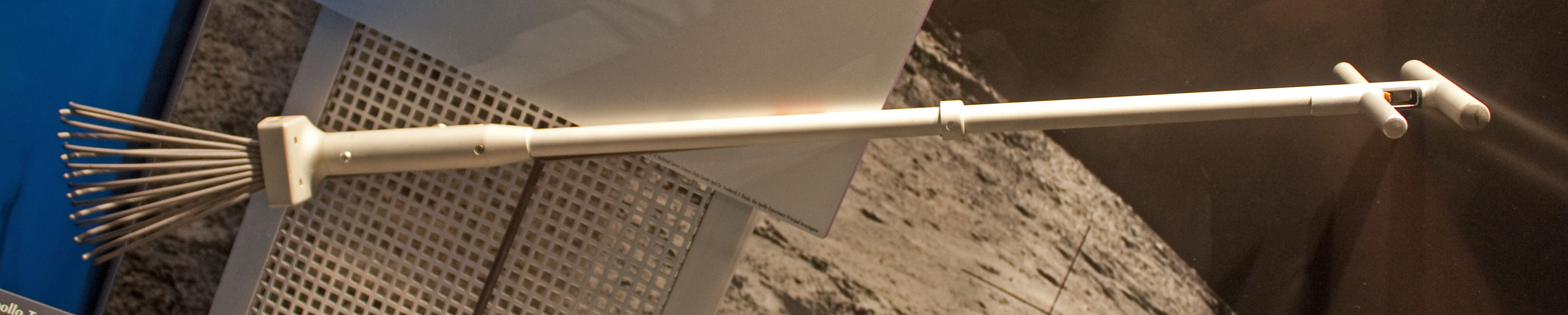
Tongs used to pick up Moon rocks

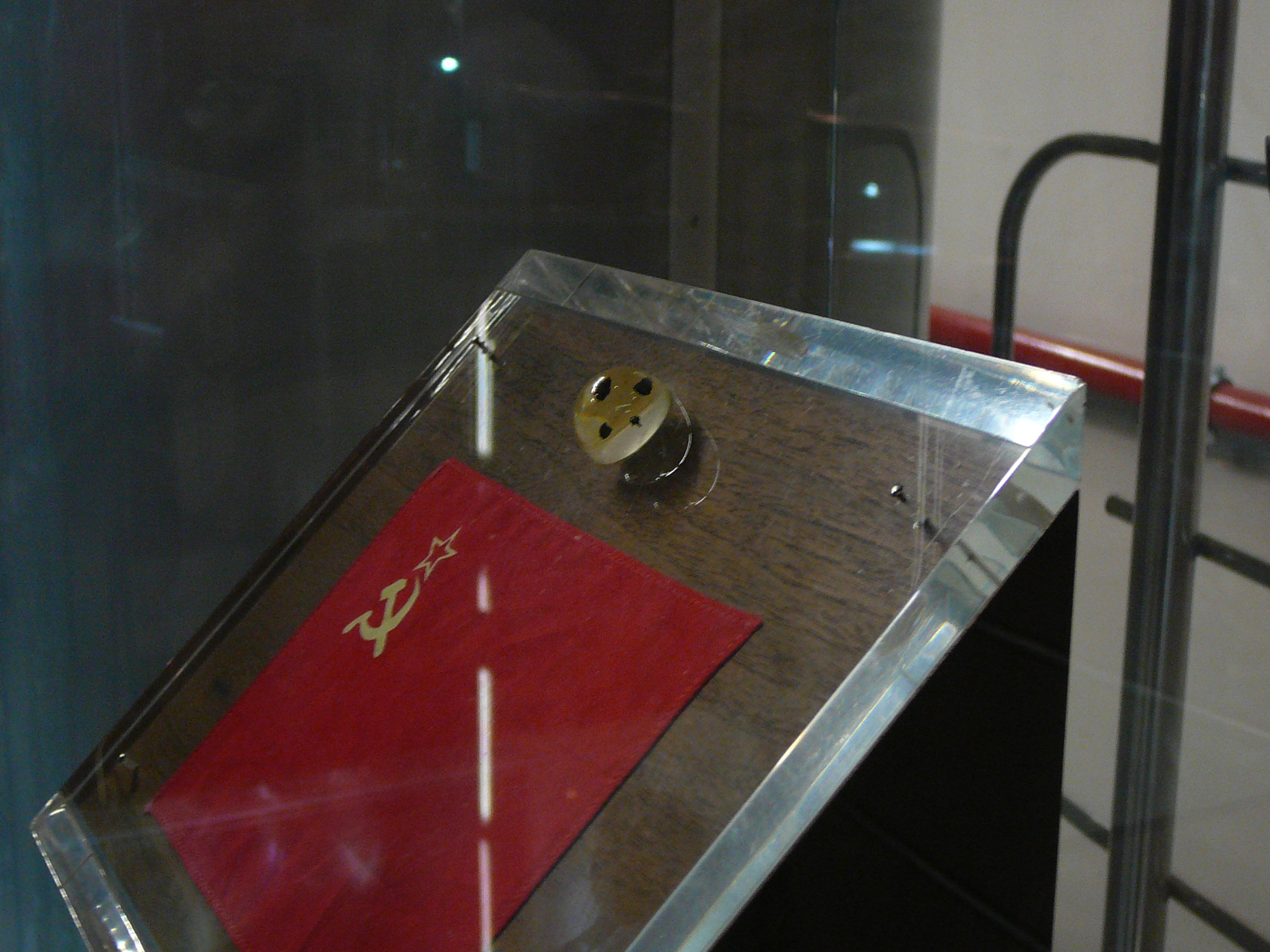
A piece of regolith from Apollo 11 presented to the Soviet Union and exhibited in the Memorial Museum of Cosmonautics in Moscow.

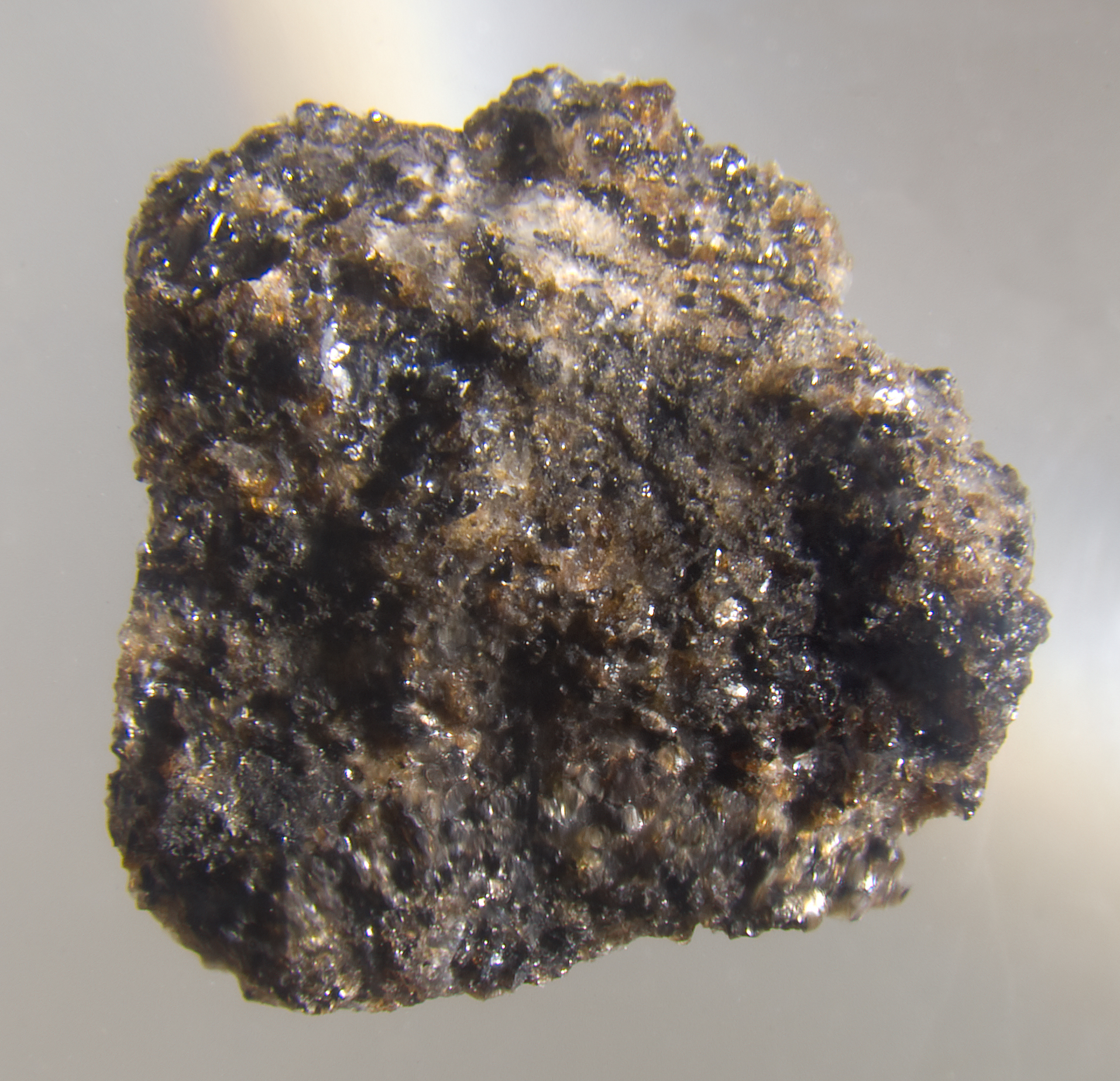
Apollo 17 "Goodwill Moonrock"

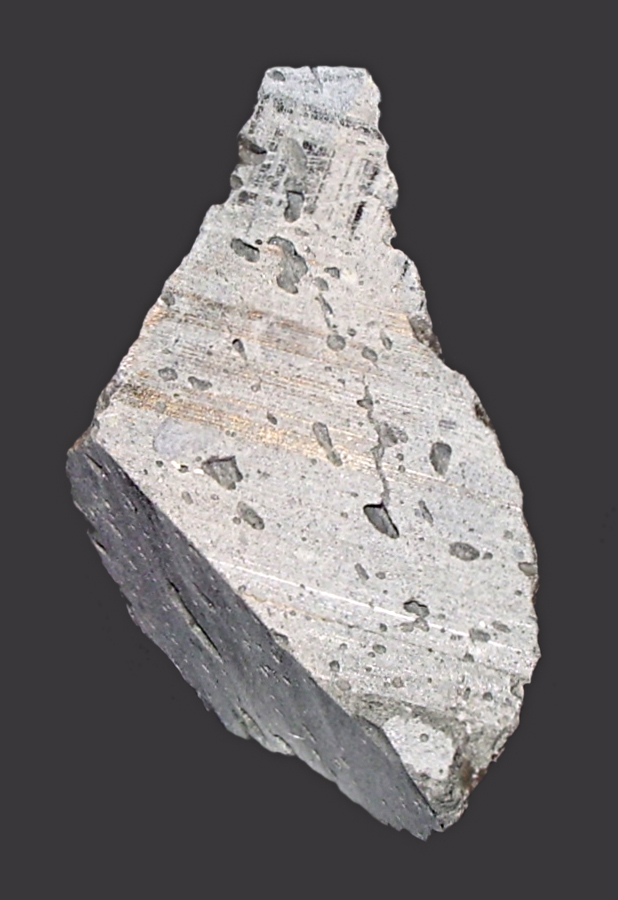
Cut fragment of Apollo 17 sample 76015, an impact melt breccia

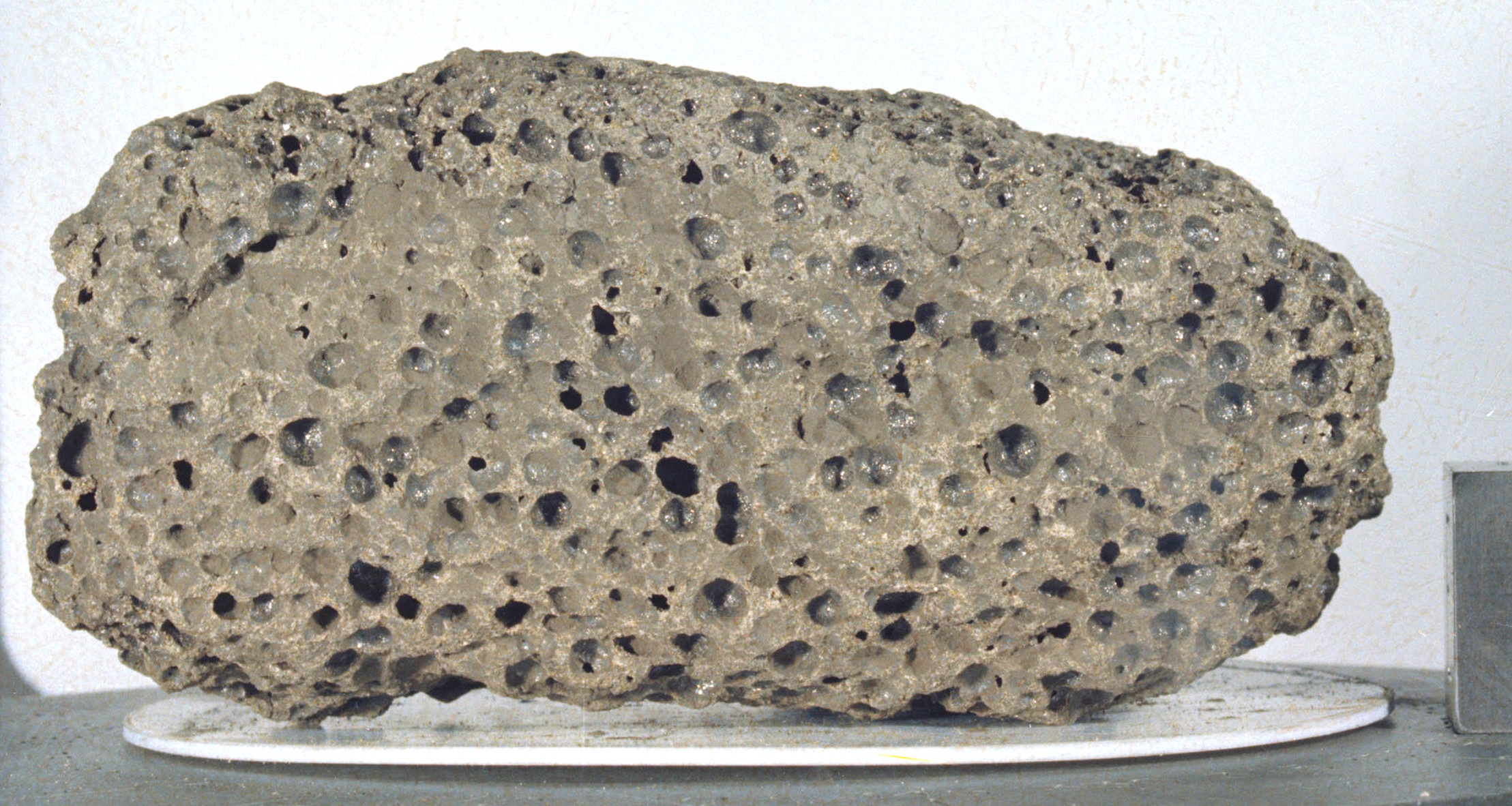
Sample 15016, the Seatbelt basalt

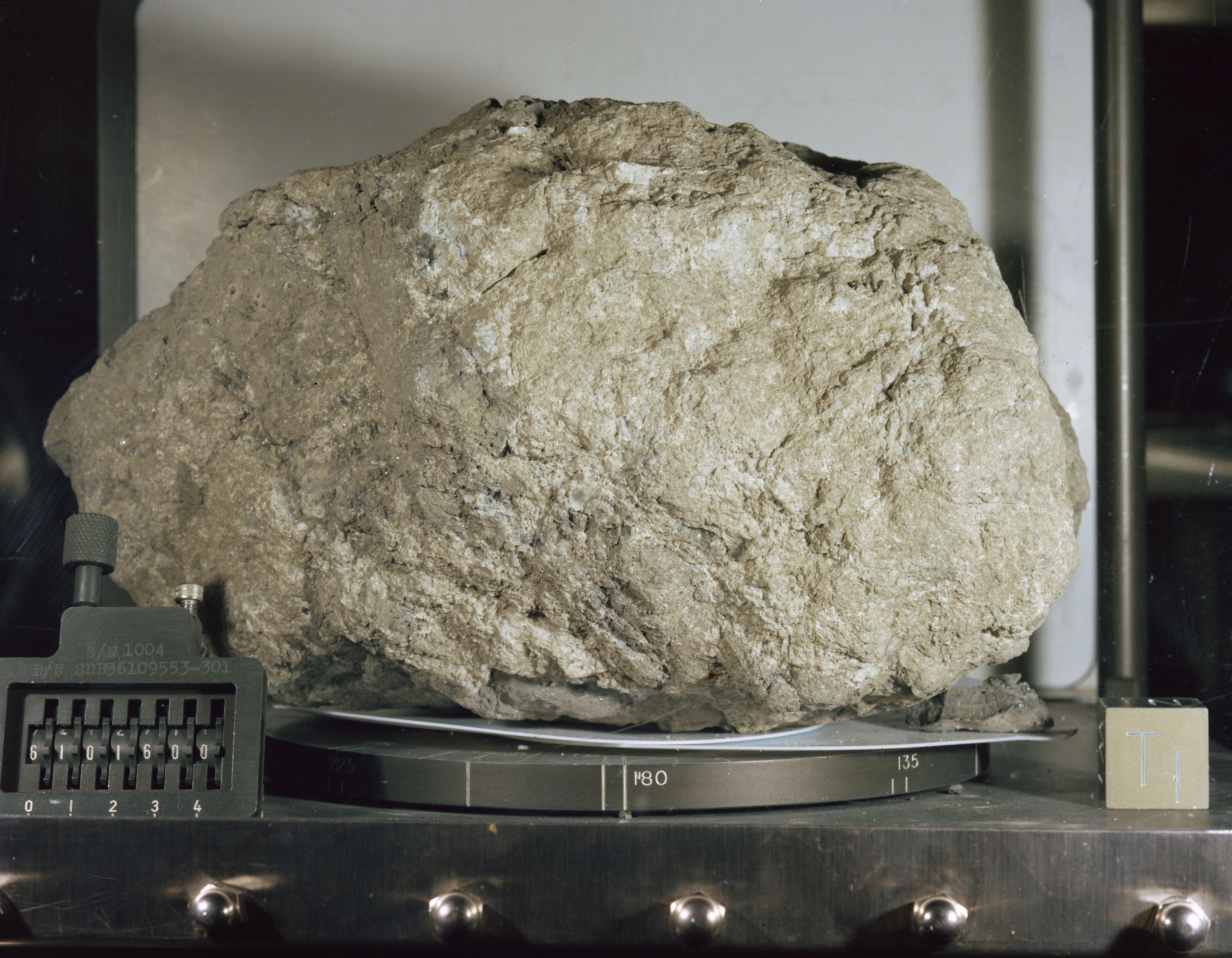
Apollo 16's sample 61016, better known as Big Muley, is the largest sample collected during the Apollo program

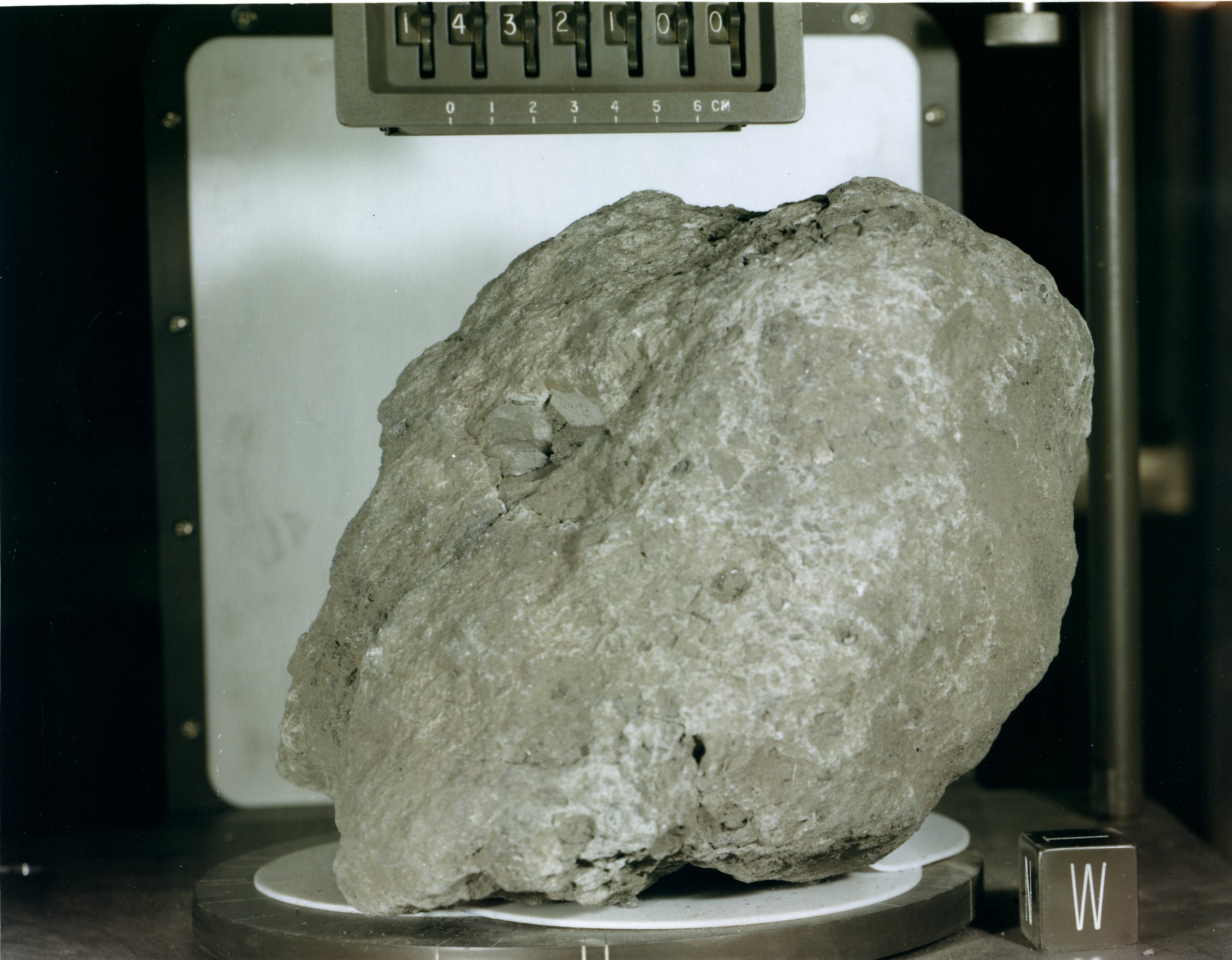
Big Bertha, collected on Apollo 14, is among the largest rock samples returned from the Moon (nearly 9 kilograms)

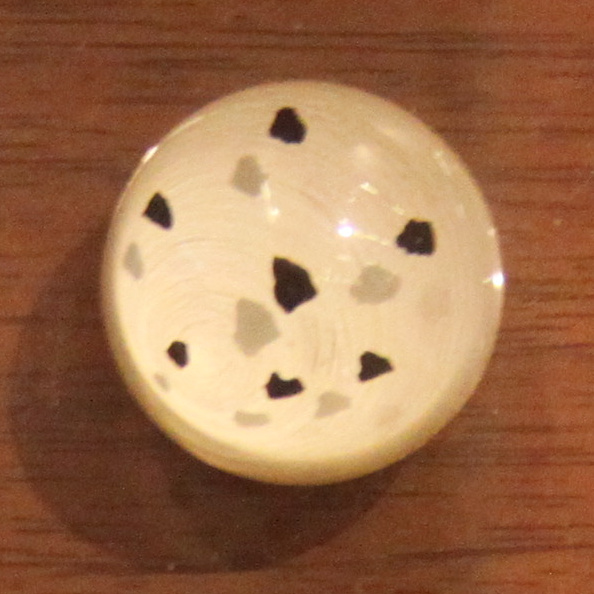
Moon rocks on display at the National Museum of China

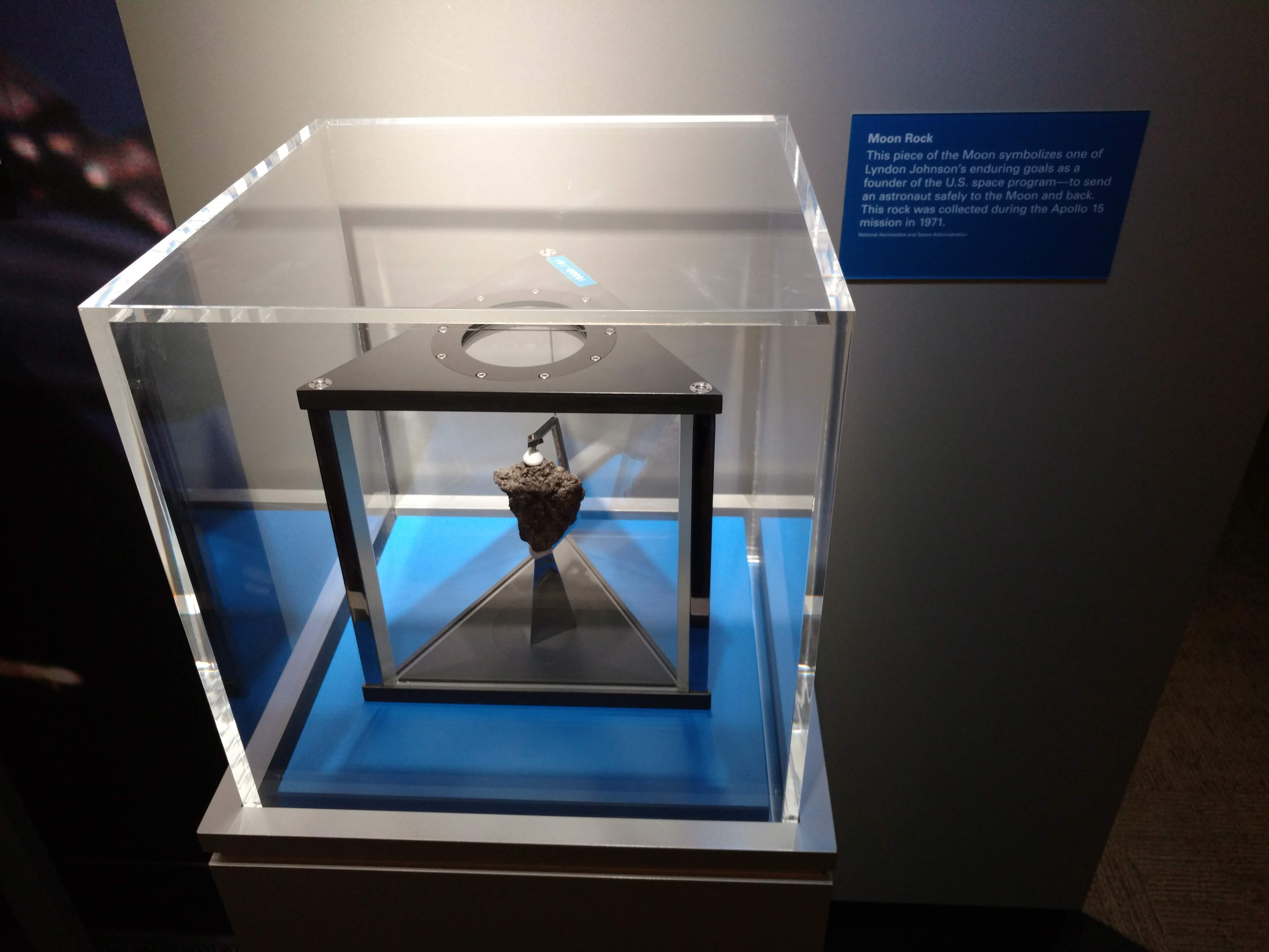
This Moon rock was collected during the Apollo 15 mission in 1971. Located at the Lyndon B. Johnson Presidential Library in Austin, Texas.

== See also ==
- Sample-return mission
- Bench Crater meteorite
- Geology of the Moon
- Hadley Rille meteorite
- Helium-3
- List of Apollo lunar sample displays
- List of individual rocks
- Lunar water
- Lunar Receiving Laboratory
- Lunar regolith simulant
- Lunar resources
- Lunar regolith
