= Pyroxmangite =

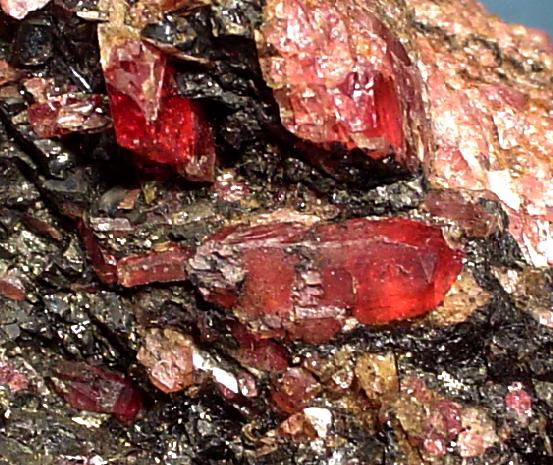
- Pyroxmangite from Chubu Region, Honshu Island, Japan

General
- Category: Inosilicate minerals (single chain)
- Group: Pyroxene group
- Series: Pyroxferroite-Pyroxmangite series
- Formula: MnSiO_{3}
- IMA symbol: Pxm
- Strunz classification: 9.DO.05
- Crystal system: Triclinic
- Crystal class: Pinacoidal (1̅) (same H-M symbol)
- Space group: C1̅
- Unit cell: a = 9.69 Å, b = 10.5 Å, c = 17.39 Å; α = 112.17°, β = 102.85°, γ = 82.93°; V = 1,596.00 Å^{3}; Z = 28

Identification
- Color: pink, red, brown
- Twinning: Lamellar on {010}, simple on {001}
- Cleavage: Perfect on {110}, {11̅0}, (110) ^ (11̅0) = 92° poor on {010}, {001}
- Fracture: hackly, uneven
- Tenacity: brittle
- Mohs scale hardness: 5 1/2 – 6
- Luster: vitreous, pearly
- Streak: colorless
- Diaphaneity: transparent, translucent
- Specific gravity: 3.8
- Birefringence: δ=0.018
- Other characteristics: morphology: tabular crystals, granular massive, grainy

Pyroxmangite has the general chemical formula of MnSiO_{3}. It is the high-pressure, low-temperature dimorph of rhodonite.

It was first described in 1913 and named for the mineral group, pyroxenes, and is known as the manganese member. It forms a series with pyroxferroite.

Pyroxmangite occurs in metamorphosed ore deposits rich in manganese. Associated minerals include spessartine, tephroite, alleghanyite, hausmannite, pyrophanite, alabandite, rhodonite and rhodochrosite.
