= Pyroxferroite =

Single chain inosilicate mineral

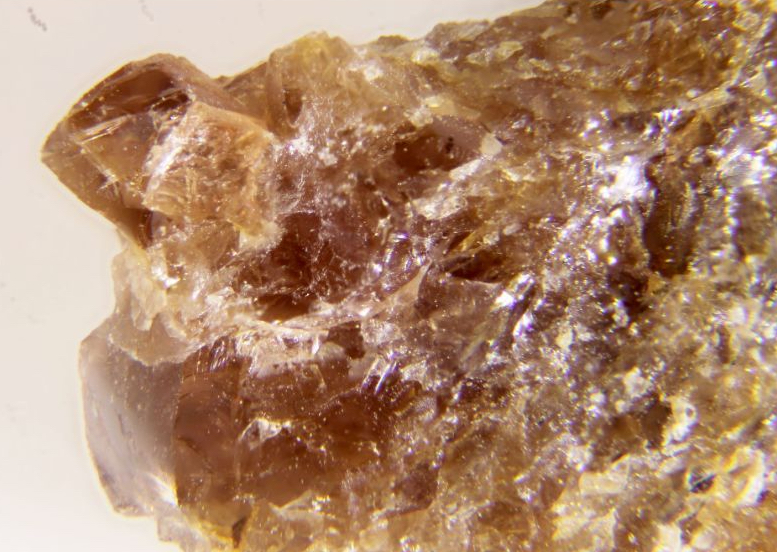
- Pyroxferroite

General
- Category: Inosilicate minerals (single chain)
- Group: Pyroxene group
- Series: Pyroxferroite-Pyroxmangite series
- Formula: (Fe^{2+},Ca)SiO_{3}
- IMA symbol: Pxf
- Strunz classification: 9.DO.05
- Crystal system: Triclinic
- Space group: P1̅ (no. 2)
- Unit cell: a = 6.6213 Å, b = 7.5506 Å, c = 17.3806 Å, α = 114.267°, β = 82.684°, γ = 94.756°, Z = 14

Identification
- Color: Yellow
- Cleavage: Good on (010), poor on (001)
- Mohs scale hardness: 4.5–5.5
- Luster: Vitreous
- Streak: White
- Specific gravity: 3.68–3.76 g/cm^{3} (measured)
- Optical properties: Biaxial (+)
- Refractive index: n_{α} = 1.748–1.756 n_{β} = 1.750–1.758 n_{γ} = 1.767–1.768
- Pleochroism: Faint; pale yellow to yellow-orange
- 2V angle: 34–40°

Pyroxferroite (Fe^{2+},Ca)SiO_{3} is a single chain inosilicate. It is mostly composed of iron, silicon and oxygen, with smaller fractions of calcium and several other metals. Together with armalcolite and tranquillityite, it is one of the three minerals which were discovered on the Moon during the 1969 Apollo 11 mission. It was then found in Lunar and Martian meteorites as well as a mineral in the Earth's crust. Pyroxferroite can also be produced by annealing synthetic clinopyroxene at high pressures and temperatures. The mineral is metastable and gradually decomposes at ambient conditions, but this process can take billions of years.

== Etymology ==
Pyroxferroite is named from pyroxene and ferrum (Latin for iron), as the iron-rich analogue of pyroxmangite. The word pyroxene, in turn comes from the Greek words for fire (πυρ) and stranger (ξένος). Pyroxenes were named this way because of their presence in volcanic lavas, where they are sometimes seen as crystals embedded in volcanic glass; it was assumed they were impurities in the glass, hence the name "fire strangers". However, they are simply early-forming minerals that crystallized before the lava erupted.

== Occurrence ==
Pyroxferroite was first discovered in 1969 in lunar rock samples from Tranquility Base, the Sea of Tranquility landing site of Apollo 11. Together with armalcolite and tranquillityite, it is one of the three minerals which were first found on the Moon. Later, pyroxferroite was detected in Lunar and Martian meteorites recovered in Oman. It also occurs in the Earth's crust, in association with clinopyroxene, plagioclase, ilmenite, cristobalite, tridymite, fayalite, fluorapatite and potassic feldspar, and forms series with pyroxmangite. Pyroxferroite has been found in the Isanago mine, in Kyoto Prefecture, Japan; near Iva, Anderson County, South Carolina, US; from Väster Silfberg, Värmland, Sweden; and Lapua, Finland. In the original lunar samples, pyroxferroite was associated with similar minerals, but also with troilite which is rare on Earth, but is common on the Moon and Mars.

== Synthesis ==
Synthetic pyroxferroite crystals can be produced by compressing synthetic clinopyroxene (composition Ca_{0.15}Fe_{0.85}SiO_{3}) to a pressure in the range of 10–17.5 kbar and heating it to 1130–1250 °C. It is metastable at low temperatures and pressures: at pressures below 10 kbar pyroxferroite converts to a mixture of olivine, pyroxene and a silicon dioxide phase, whereas at low temperatures, it transforms to a clinopyroxene. The presence of cristobalite, vesicular texture and some other petrographic observations indicate that the lunar pyroxferroite was produced upon rapid cooling from low-pressure and high-temperature (volcanic) conditions, i.e. that the mineral is metastable. However, the conversion rate is very slow and pyroxferroite can exist at low temperatures for periods longer than 3 billion years.

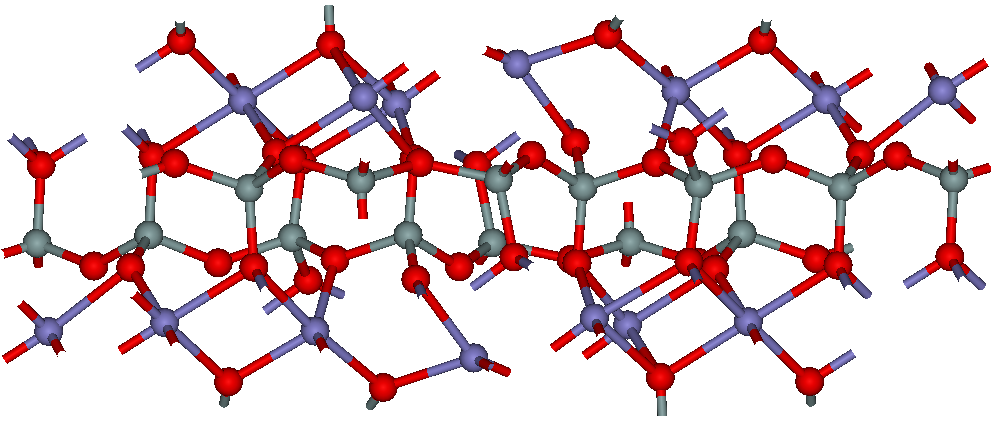
Crystal structure. Colors: blue – Fe, gray – Si, red – oxygen.

== Properties ==
The crystal structure of pyroxferroite contains silicon-oxygen chains with a repeat period of seven SiO_{4} tetrahedra. These chains are separated by polyhedra where a central metal atom is surrounded by 6 or 7 oxygen atoms; there are 7 inequivalent metal polyhedra in the unit cell. The resulted layers are parallel to (110) planes in pyroxferroite, whereas they are parallel to (100) planes in pyroxenes.

Chemical composition of pyroxferroite can be decomposed into elementary oxides as follows: FeO (concentration 44–48%), SiO_{2}(45–47%), CaO (4.7–6.1%), MnO (0.6–1.3%), MgO (0.3-1%), TiO_{2} (0.2–0.5%) and Al_{2}O_{3} (0.2–1.2%). Whereas magnesium is usually present at about 0.8%, in some samples it had an undetectably low concentration.
