= Apollo Lunar Sample Return Container =

Container used in the Apollo program

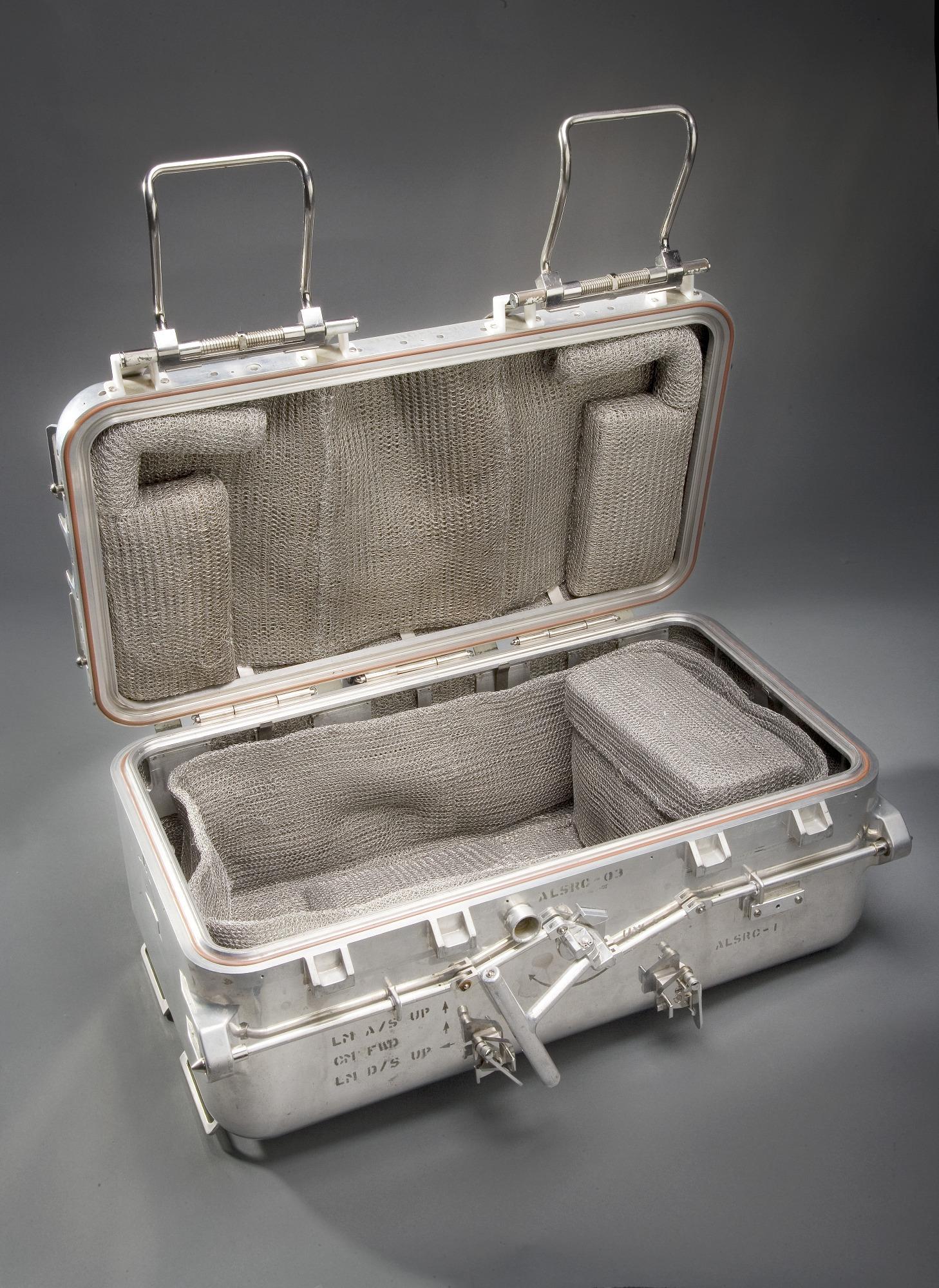
- Apollo Lunar Sample Return Container used on Apollo 11
- Operator: NASA
- Manufacturer: Union Carbide, Y-12 National Security Complex
- Instrument type: Storage and transport container
- Function: Preservation and safe return of lunar samples
- Began operations: Apollo 11
- Ceased operations: Apollo 17

Host spacecraft
- Spacecraft: Apollo Lunar Module

The Apollo Lunar Sample Return Container (ALSRC), colloquially referred to as the "rock box," was a specially designed aluminum container used during the Apollo program to collect, seal, and return lunar samples to Earth. ALSRC units flew on crewed Apollo lunar landing missions between 1969 and 1972.

== Design and purpose ==
The ALSRC was made of aluminum and incorporated a triple-seal system to prevent contamination of the lunar material and to maintain an internal vacuum. Its interior was lined with an aluminum mesh that cushioned rock and soil samples during transport.

To ensure airtight sealing, it employed knife-edge seals and high-temperature O-rings. The container featured toggle-lever latches and a T-bar, allowing astronauts with bulky pressurized gloves to secure it reliably on the lunar surface.

== Missions ==
During extravehicular activity (EVA), astronauts placed lunar rock and soil samples into numbered Teflon sample bags, then sealed the bags inside an ALSRC. Upon return to Earth, the containers were transferred to the Lunar Receiving Laboratory at the Johnson Space Center, where they were opened in nitrogen-purged gloveboxes to avoid terrestrial contamination. Some containers and their contents remained sealed for decades to allow for study with future analytical techniques. Several were only opened after 2019.

== Engineering and development ==
The ALSRC addressed challenges of lunar sample preservation, including exposure to vacuum, extreme temperatures, and vibration during launch and re-entry. NASA mechanical engineer Yvonne Y. Clark was noted for her contributions to the design and testing of the containers.

The aluminum boxes were cast, machined, and assembled by Union Carbide Corporation's Nuclear Division at the Y-12 National Security Complex in Oak Ridge, Tennessee, which was under contract with NASA, with a total of 16 being made.

== Legacy ==
A number of ALSRCs are preserved in museums. The container used on Apollo 11 is held by the National Air and Space Museum in Washington, D.C., while others are displayed at institutions including the San Diego Air & Space Museum.

== See also ==
- Apollo program
- Lunar sample
- Sample-return mission
- Lunar Sample Laboratory Facility
