= Yvonne Clark =

American engineer

Yvonne Young Clark
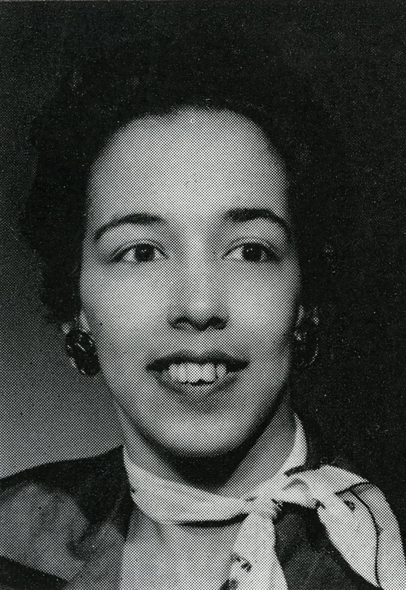
- Clark in c. 1961
- Born: April 13, 1929; Houston, Texas, U.S.
- Died: January 27, 2019 (aged 89); Nashville, Tennessee, U.S.
- Resting place: Cave Hill Cemetery; Louisville, Kentucky, U.S.
- Education: Howard University (BS); Vanderbilt University (MS)
- Scientific career
- Fields: Mechanical Engineering
- Institutions: Frankford Arsenal US. Army ammunition plant; RCA Camden; NASA; Westinghouse Defense and Space Center (now Northrop Grumman Electronic Systems); Ford glass plant; Tennessee State University

Yvonne Y. Clark (born Georgianna Yvonne Young; April 13, 1929 – January 27, 2019) was a pioneer for African-American and women engineers. Also known as Y.Y., she was the first woman to earn a Bachelor of Science degree in mechanical engineering at Howard University, the first woman to earn a master's degree in Engineering Management from Vanderbilt University, and the first woman to serve as a faculty member in the College of Engineering and Technology at Tennessee State University, afterward becoming a professor emeritus.

== Early life ==
Yvonne was born in 1929 in Houston, Texas and raised in Louisville, Kentucky. Her father, Dr. Coleman Milton Young Jr., was a physician/surgeon and her mother, Hortense Houston Young, was a librarian and journalist for the Louisville Defender. Her brother, C. Milton Young, III, became a physician. Yvonne Clark was the great-granddaughter of Joshua Houston on her mother's side. As a child she had a love for building and fixing things. Yvonne chose to pursue engineering due to a childhood dream of becoming a pilot.

== Education ==
Yvonne Clark's aspirations to become a pilot led her to pursue an engineering path at Central High School, but the mechanical drawing teacher did not allow her to enroll in the class at school because she was a girl. Clark circumvented this setback by enrolling in a summer course with a different teacher. She took an aeronautics class in high school and joined the school's Civil Air Patrol, where she learned to shoot and had flying lessons in a simulator.

In 1945 she graduated from Central High in just two years at age 16 and spent the next two years studying at Girls Latin School in Boston. Clark was accepted to the University of Louisville but was unable to attend due to segregation. Clark then became the first woman to earn a degree in mechanical engineering from Howard University, where she was a captain of the cheerleading squad and the only female in her mechanical engineering class of almost entirely returned World War II veterans. After she graduated in 1951, she found that "the engineering job market wasn't very receptive to women, particularly women of color."

Clark was the first African-American woman to earn a master's degree in Engineering Management from Vanderbilt University in 1972, after having sent the first African-American students to their engineering department earlier. Her thesis was titled "Designing procedures for materials flow management in major rebuild projects in the glass industry."

== Career ==
Yvonne's first job after gaining her degree was in the Frankford Arsenal Gauge Lab, a U.S. Army ammunition plant in Philadelphia. She then moved to a small record label, RCA Camden, in New Jersey, where she designed factory equipment. Clark returned to the South to get married, and became the first female member of the Tennessee State University mechanical engineering department, joining the faculty in 1956. She twice chaired the department, initially from 1965 until 1970 and then starting in 1977, and held the position for 11 years. She retired as a professor.

Clark worked industry jobs during her summers which is when she did her work for NASA, Westinghouse, and Ford. In 1971 Clark worked at the Nashville Glass Plant of Ford Motor Company while working towards her master's degree at Vanderbilt, where she was their first female engineer.

Clark helped to start Tennessee State's chapter of Pi Tau Sigma, a mechanical engineering society. She encouraged women to become engineers and reported in 1997 that 25% of the students in her department were female.

== Research ==
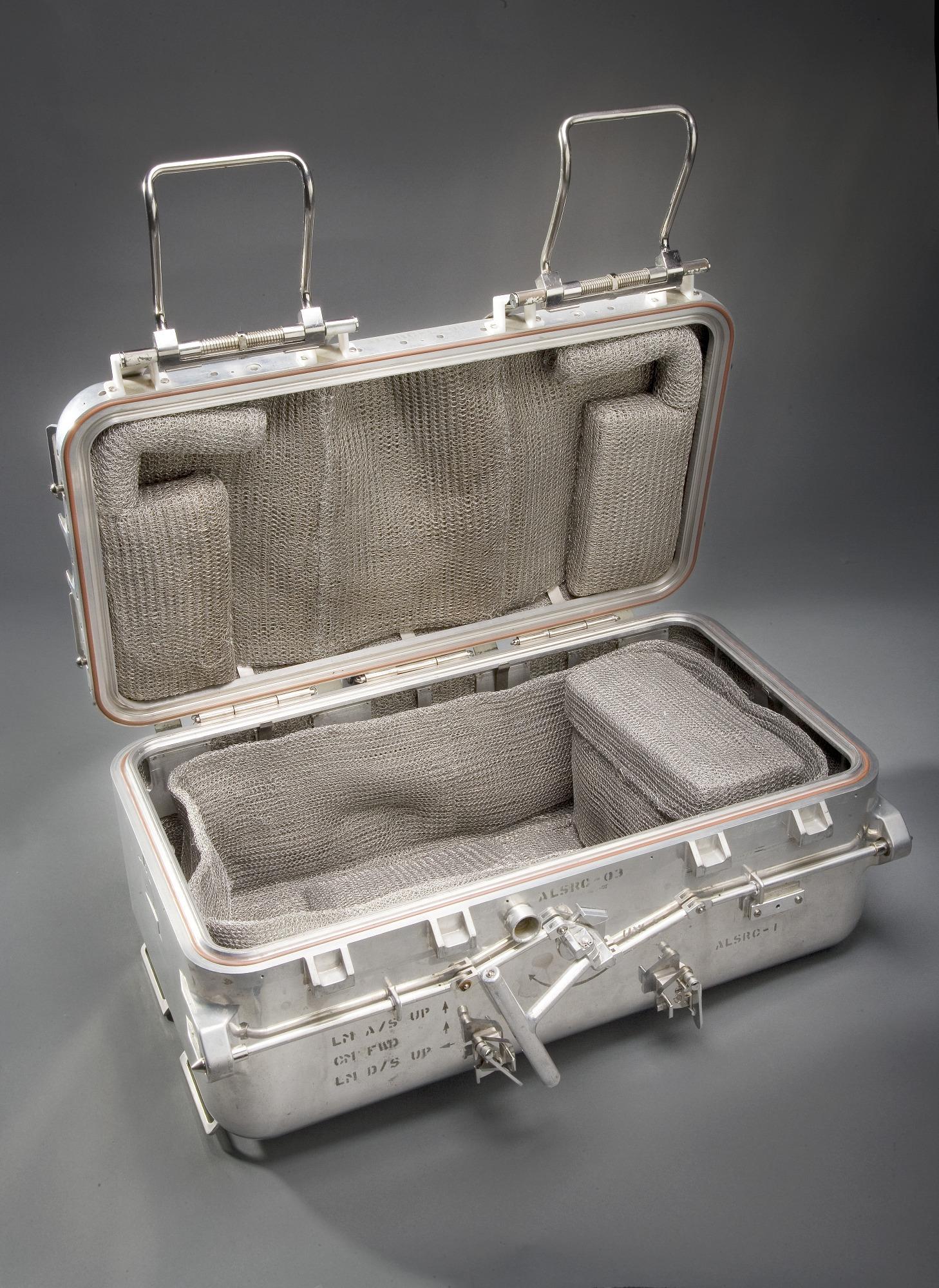
Apollo Lunar Sample Return Container (ALSRC) aluminum box with a triple seal.

Clark spent many summers at Frankford Arsenal researching recoilless weapons in the Dynamic Analysis Branch. There, she researched the movements of missiles and rockets. In the summer of 1963 Clark was hired to work for NASA at the George C. Marshall Air and Space Flight Center in Huntsville, Alabama, where she investigated the cause of hot spots identified in Saturn V engines. She then spent a summer at the NASA Manned Spacecraft Center in Houston, helping design the Apollo Lunar Sample Return Containers used on Apollo 11 that Neil Armstrong used to bring moon samples back to Earth. The research focused on ensuring the materials used to make the container would be able to withstand the extreme temperature differences of the moon while maintaining the ambient pressure of the moon as to not change any properties of the samples.

Clark did further research that discovered methods for revitalizing and modernizing part of the inner city through the Westinghouse's Defense and Space Center in Baltimore, Maryland. As of the 1990s, her research focused on refrigerants. She served as the main investigator for the research project "Experimental Evaluation of the Performance of Alternative Refrigerants in Heat Pump Cycles," funded by the Department of Energy's Oak Ridge National Laboratory. Clark was also the student division team leader for the NASA funded project at TSU called the Center for Automated Space Science.

== Personal life ==
Yvonne Clark is known for her achievements as an engineer and teacher, her family attribute some of her exceptional ability to persevere through adversity or her "rhino skin" to growing up with a congenital stutter.

Yvonne Young married William F. Clark Jr., a biochemistry teacher at Meharry Medical College, in 1955. Her husband was originally from Raleigh, North Carolina. They had a son in 1956 and a daughter in 1968. Her daughter, Carol Lawson, interviewed Clark for the Society of Women Engineers in 2007. Clark's granddaughter, Paris Lawson, is a sideline reporter for the Oklahoma City Thunder. Yvonne Young Clark died at her home in Nashville on January 27, 2019.

== Awards ==
- Member and Executive Committee, Society of Women Engineers (1952–)
- Fellow of the Society of Women Engineers (1984–)
- Mechanism of the Year Award given by the TSU student Chapter of ASME for her unyielding support to her students. (1990)
- Women of Color Technology Award for Educational Leadership, by U.S. Black Engineers (1977)
- Adult Black Achievers Award by the Northwest Family YMCA for being a role model and mentor to the youth of today. (1977)
- Distinguished Engineering Educator Award (1998)
- Distinguished Service Award by the Tennessee Society of Professional Engineers (TSPE) for her outstanding leadership to her profession and contributions to the community. (2001)
- President's Distinguished University Award from TSU for 50 years of loyalty, dedication, and determination during her career in academia (2006)
- Educator of the Year Award by Delta Sigma Theta sorority, Nashville Alumnae chapter (2008)
- Member, American Society of Engineering Education
- Member, American Society of Mechanical Engineers
