= Tranquillityite =

Silicate mineral

General
- Category: Silicate mineral (nesosilicate group)
- Formula: (Fe^{2+})_{8}Ti_{3}Zr_{2} Si_{3}O_{24}
- IMA symbol: Trq
- Strunz classification: 9.AG.90
- Dana classification: 78.07.16.01 (Unclassified silicates)
- Crystal system: Hexagonal; Unknown space group
- Unit cell: a = 11.69, c = 22.25 [Å] Z = 6; V = 2,633.24 Å^{3}

Identification
- Color: Gray, dark red-brown in transmitted light
- Crystal habit: Lath shaped grains generally found as inclusions in other minerals or interstitial (<0.1% in weight)
- Luster: Submetalic
- Diaphaneity: Opaque to semitransparent
- Density: 4.7 ± 0.1 g/cm^{3}
- Optical properties: Biaxial
- Refractive index: n_{α} = 2.120
- Pleochroism: No
- 2V angle: 40°
- Common impurities: Y, Hf, Al, Cr, Nb, Nd, Mn, Ca

Tranquillityite is a silicate mineral with formula (Fe^{2+})_{8}Ti_{3}Zr_{2} Si_{3}O_{24}. It is mostly composed of iron, oxygen, silicon, zirconium and titanium with smaller fractions of yttrium and calcium. It is named after the Mare Tranquillitatis (Sea of Tranquility), the place on the Moon where the rock samples were found during the 1969 Apollo 11 mission. It was the last mineral brought from the Moon which was thought to be unique, with no counterpart on Earth, until it was discovered in Australia in 2011.

== Discovery ==
In 1970, materials scientists found a new unnamed Fe-Ti-Zr silicate mineral containing rare earths and Y in lunar rock sample 10047. The first detailed analysis of the mineral was published in 1971 and the name "tranquillityite" was proposed and later accepted by the International Mineralogical Association. It was later found in lunar rock samples from all Apollo missions. Samples were dated using Pb/Pb ion probe techniques.

Together with armalcolite and pyroxferroite, it is one of the three minerals which were first discovered on the Moon, before terrestrial occurrences were found. Fragments of tranquillityite were later found in Northwest Africa, in the NWA 856 Martian meteorite.

Terrestrial occurrences of tranquillityite were found in six localities in the Pilbara region of Western Australia in 2011. The Australian occurrences include a number of Proterozoic to Cambrian age diabase and gabbro dikes and sills. It occurs as interstitial grains with zirconolite, baddeleyite, and apatite associated with late stage intergrowths of quartz and feldspar.

== Properties ==
Tranquillityite forms thin stripes up to 15 by 65 micrometres in size in basaltic rocks, where it was produced at a late crystallization stage. It is associated with troilite, pyroxferroite, cristobalite and alkali feldspar. The mineral is nearly opaque and appears dark red-brown in thin crystals. The analyzed samples contain less than 10% impurities (Y, Al, Mn, Cr, Nb and other rare-earth element) and up to 0.01% (100 ppm) of uranium. Presence of a significant amount of uranium allowed scientists to estimate the age of tranquillityite and some associated minerals in Apollo 11 samples as 3710 million years using the uranium–lead dating technique.

Irradiation by alpha particles generated by uranium decay is believed to be the origin of the predominantly amorphous metamict structure of tranquillityite. Its crystals were obtained by annealing the samples at 800 °C (1,470 °F) for 30 minutes. Longer annealing did not improve the crystalline quality, and annealing at higher temperatures resulted in spontaneous fracture of samples.

The crystals were initially found to have a hexagonal crystal structure with the lattice parameters, a = 1.169 nm, c = 2.225 nm and three formula units per unit cell, but later reassigned a face-centered cubic structure (fluorite-like). A tranquillityite-like crystalline phase has been synthesized by mixing oxide powders in an appropriate ratio, determined from the chemical analysis of the lunar samples, and annealing the mixture at 1,500 °C (2,730 °F). This phase was not pure, but intergrown with various intermetallic compounds.

== See also ==
- Armalcolite
- Pyroxferroite
