= Armalcolite =

Oxide mineral

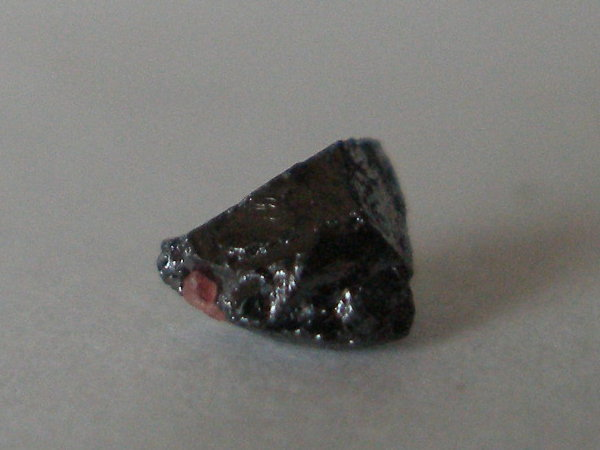
- Armalcolite from Myanmar (grain size 5 mm)

General
- Category: Titanium mineral
- Formula: (Mg,Fe^{2+})Ti_{2}O_{5}
- IMA symbol: Arm
- Strunz classification: 4.CB.15
- Crystal system: Orthorhombic
- Crystal class: Dipyramidal (mmm); H-M symbol: (2/m 2/m 2/m)
- Space group: Bbmm
- Unit cell: a = 9.743(30) b = 10.023(20) c = 3.738(30) [Å], Z = 5

Identification
- Color: Gray to tan in reflection, opaque
- Mohs scale hardness: <5
- Luster: Metallic
- Specific gravity: 4.64 g/cm^{3} (measured)
- Optical properties: Biaxial

Armalcolite (/ˌɑːrˈmɑːlkəlaɪt/) is a titanium-rich mineral with the chemical formula (Mg,Fe^{2+})Ti_{2}O_{5}. It was first found at Tranquility Base on the Moon in 1969 during the Apollo 11 mission, and is named for Armstrong, Aldrin and Collins, the three Apollo 11 astronauts. Together with tranquillityite and pyroxferroite, it is one of three new minerals that were discovered on the Moon. Armalcolite was later identified at various locations on Earth and has been synthesized in the laboratory. (Tranquillityite and pyroxferroite were also later found at various locations on Earth). The synthesis requires low pressures, high temperatures and rapid quenching from about 1,000 °C to the ambient temperature. Armalcolite breaks down to a mixture of magnesium-rich ilmenite and rutile at temperatures below 1,000 °C, but the conversion slows down with cooling. Because of this quenching requirement, armalcolite is relatively rare and is usually found in association with ilmenite and rutile, among other minerals.

== Occurrence ==
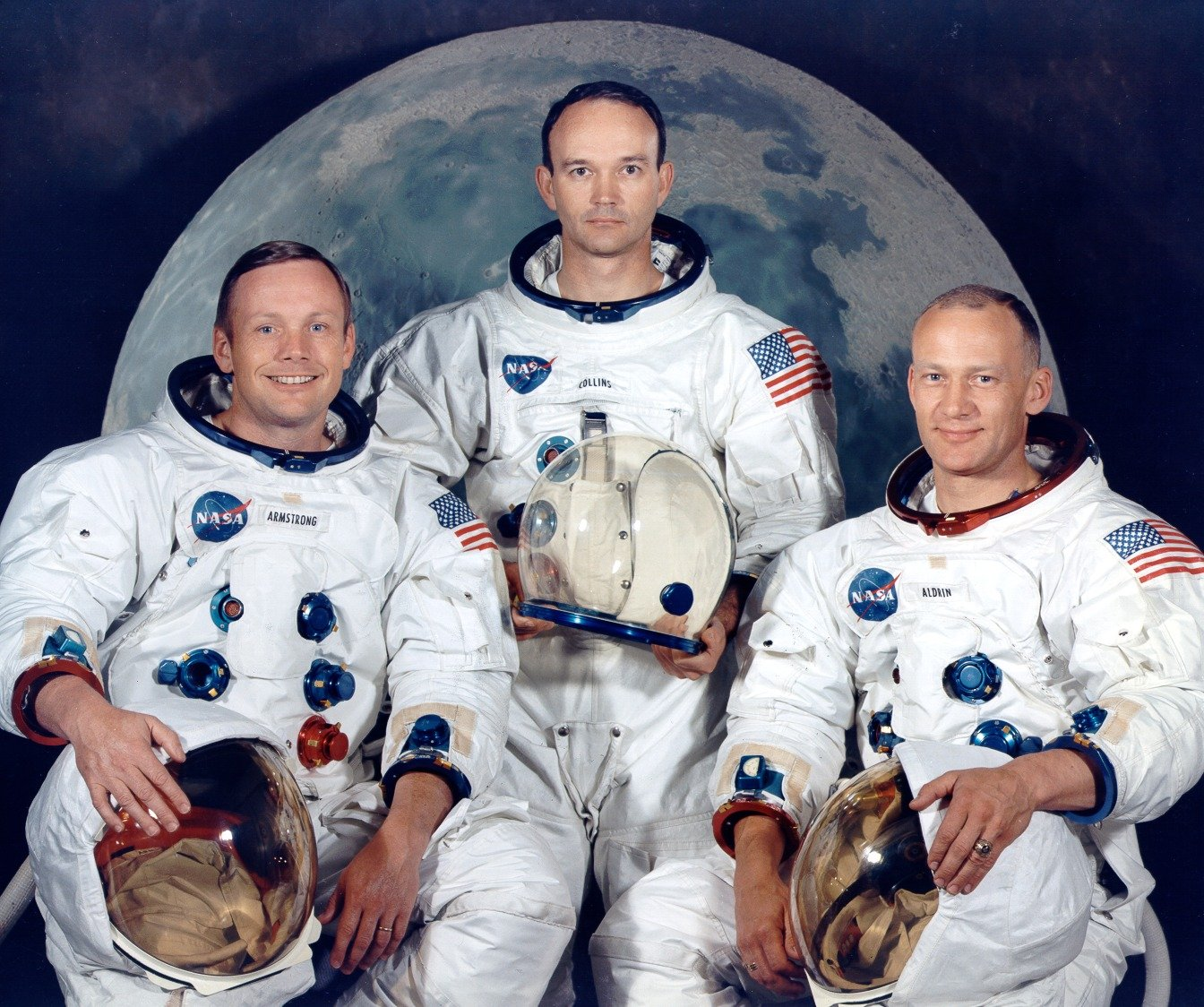
The Apollo 11 crew, after whom Armalcolite is named. Left to right are Neil Armstrong, Michael Collins, and Buzz Aldrin.

Armalcolite was originally found on the Moon, in the Sea of Tranquility at Tranquility Base, and also in the Taurus–Littrow valley and the Descartes Highlands. The largest amounts were provided by the Apollo 11 and 17 missions. It was later identified on Earth from samples of lamproite dikes and plugs taken in Smoky Butte, Garfield County, Montana, US. On the Earth, it also occurs in Germany (Nördlinger Ries impact crater in Bavaria), Greenland (Disko Island), Mexico (El Toro cinder cone, San Luis Potosí), South Africa (Jagersfontein, Bultfontein and Dutoitspan kimberlite mines), Spain (Albacete Province and Jumilla, Murcia), Ukraine (Pripyat Swell), United States (Knippa quarry, Uvalde County, Texas and Smoky Butte, Jordan, Montana) and Zimbabwe (Mwenezi District). Armalcolite was also detected in lunar meteorites, such as Dhofar 925 and 960 found in Oman.

Armalcolite is a minor mineral found in titanium-rich basalt rocks, volcanic lava and sometimes granite pegmatite, ultramafic rocks, lamproites and kimberlites. It is associated with various mixed iron-titanium oxides, graphite, analcime, diopside, ilmenite, phlogopite and rutile. It forms elongated crystals up to about 0.1–0.3 mm in length embedded in a basalt matrix. Petrographic analysis suggests that armalcolite is typically formed at low pressures and high temperatures.

== Synthesis ==
Armalcolite crystals up to several millimeters in length can be grown by mixing powders of iron, titanium and magnesium oxides in the correct ratio, melting them in a furnace at about 1,400 °C, letting the melt crystallize for a few days at about 1,200 °C, and then quenching the crystals to the ambient temperature. The quenching step is required both for laboratory and natural synthesis in order to avoid conversion of armalcolite to a mixture of magnesium-rich ilmenite (Mg-FeTiO_{3}) and rutile (TiO_{2}) at temperatures below 1,000 °C. This conversion threshold temperature increases with pressure and eventually crosses the melting point, meaning that the mineral cannot be formed at sufficiently high pressures. Because of this conversion to ilmenite, armalcolite has a relatively low abundance and is associated with ilmenite and rutile. Consequently, the relative amount of ilmenite and armalcolite can be used as an indicator of the cooling rate of a mineral during its formation.

== Properties ==
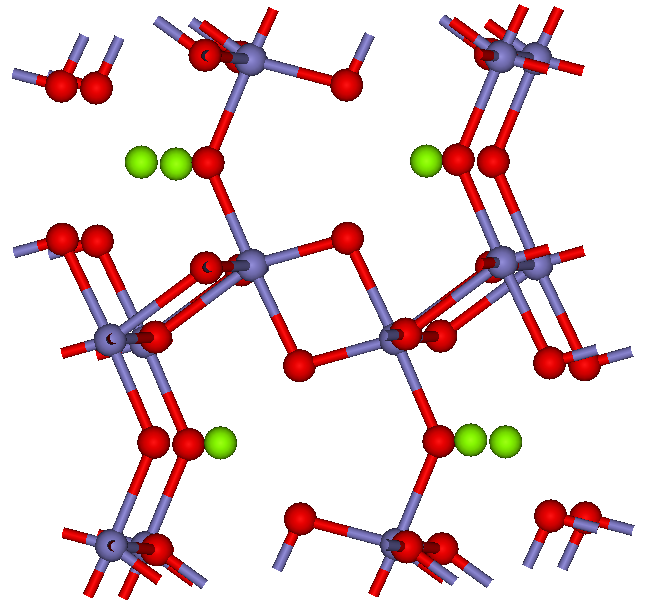
Crystal structure. Colors: green – Mg, blue – Ti, red – oxygen.

Armalcolite has a general chemical formula (Mg,Fe^{2+})Ti_{2}O_{5}. It forms opaque masses which appear gray (ortho-armalcolite) to tan (para-armalcolite) in reflection, with gray varieties being most common, especially in synthetic samples. The crystal structure is the same for the ortho- and para-armalcolite. Their chemical composition does not differ significantly, but there is a difference in the MgO and Cr_{2}O_{3} content which was attributed to dissimilar coloration. Armalcolite is a part of the pseudobrookite group which consists of minerals of the general formula X_{2}YO_{5}. X and Y are usually Fe (2+ and 3+), Mg, Al, and Ti. End members are armalcolite ((Mg,Fe)Ti_{2}O_{5}), pseudobrookite (Fe_{2}TiO_{5}), ferropseudobrookite (FeTi_{2}O_{5}) and "karrooite" (MgTi_{2}O_{5}). They are isostructural and all have orthorhombic crystal structure and occur in lunar and terrestrial rocks.

Chemical composition of most armalcolite samples can be decomposed into a sum of metal oxides as follows: TiO_{2} (concentration 71–76%), FeO (10–17%), MgO (5.5–9.4%), Al_{2}O_{3} (1.48–2%), Cr_{2}O_{3} (0.3-2%) and MnO (0–0.83%). Whereas the titanium content is relatively constant, the ratio of magnesium to iron varies and is usually lower than 1. A so-called Cr-Zr-Ca variety of armalcolite is distinguished which has an elevated content of Cr_{2}O_{3} (4.3–11.5%), ZrO_{2} (3.8–6.2%) and CaO (3–3.5%). These varieties are not distinct and intermediate compositions are also found. The iron-poor (magnesium-rich) modification of armalcolite has the same crystal structure and occurs in the Earth's crust as the mineral unofficially named "karrooite".

Most titanium is present in armalcolite in the 4+ state, owing to the reducing synthesis environment, but there is a significant fraction of Ti^{3+} in lunar samples. The Ti^{3+}/Ti^{4+} ratio in armalcolite can serve as an indicator of fugacity (effective partial pressure) of oxygen during the mineral's formation. It also allows one to distinguish lunar and terrestrial armalcolite, as Ti^{3+}/Ti^{4+} = 0 for the latter.

Since armalcolite's formula is (Mg,Fe^{2+})Ti_{2}O_{5}, it follows the general formula of XY_{2}O_{5} where the X=(Mg and Fe^{2+}), Y=Ti, and O is oxygen. Both X and Y sites are octahedrally coordinated and the radius ratio between the cations and the anions in armalcolite are at three to five ratio equaling 0.6 making the structure octahedral. Armalcolite is a titanium-rich mineral that falls under the magnesianferropseudobrookite mineral group with Fe^{2+}Ti_{2}O_{5} and MgTi_{2}O_{5} as end members. Due to having octahedral symmetry, armalcolite has solid solution (cation substitution) between multiple elements Fe^{2+}, Fe^{3+}, Mg, Al, and Ti; this is because of their similarities in atomic radii and charge. The crystallographic structure exhibited by armalcolite is an orthombic-dipyramid, thus falls in the orthorhombic category and has a 2/m 2/m 2/m point group and space group of Bbmm. Inside the M1 sites for armalcolite it is ideal for iron to reside there due to the larger size of iron and for M2, magnesium and titanium have a distribution between the two sites. In the metal sites, titanium has an eightfold; magnesium and iron with a four coordination. The magnesium and iron ratio in armalcolite decreases with decreasing temperature from 0.81 at 1,200 °C to 0.59 at 1,150 °C. Once the armalcolite reaches 1,125 °C it is replaced with ilmenite, FeTiO_{3}, which lacks both magnesium and iron.

The crystal structure of armalcolite is close to that of distorted brookite. It is based on deformed octahedra, with a titanium atom in the center and six oxygen atoms at the corners. Magnesium or iron ions are located in the interstitial sites; they do not contribute significantly to the lattice framework, which is held by Ti-O bonds via the corners of the octahedra. However, these ions affect optical properties, rendering the mineral opaque in contrast to the transparent titanium dioxide TiO_{2}.

== See also ==
- List of minerals
- List of minerals named after people
