= Joseph Gutheinz =

American lawyer

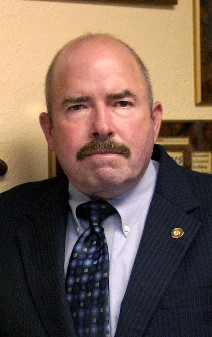
- Born: August 13, 1955 (age 71)
- Education: Monterey Peninsula College; California State University, Sacramento; University of Southern California; South Texas College of Law
- Occupations: Educator, attorney, author, retired law enforcement officer

Joseph Richard Gutheinz (born August 13, 1955) is an American attorney, college instructor, commissioner, writer, and former Army intelligence officer, Army aviator, and Federal law enforcement officer. He is known as the founder of the "Moon Rock Project" which aims to track down missing Apollo Moon rock samples.

== Education and career ==
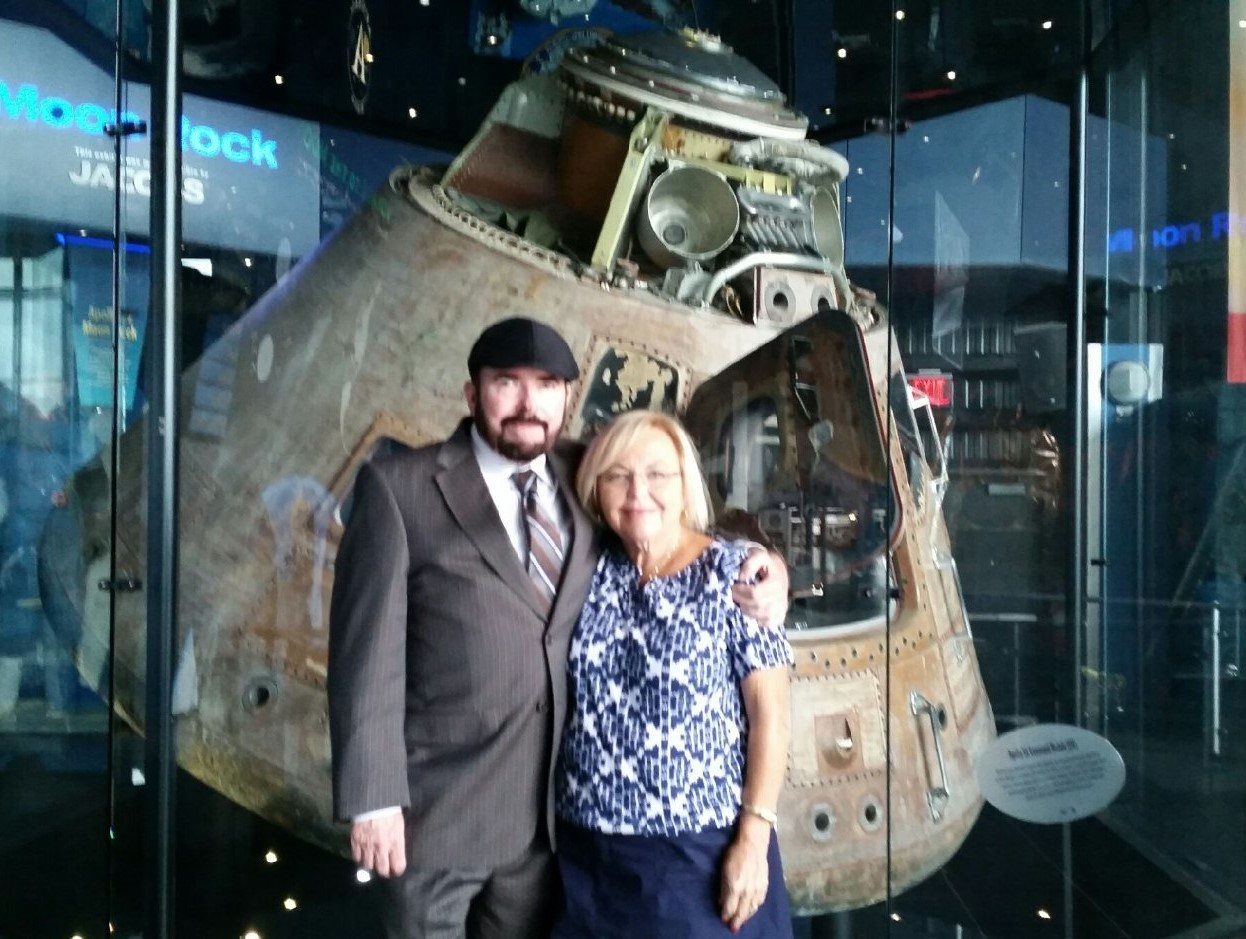
Joseph and Lori Gutheinz

Joseph Gutheinz's father was a lieutenant colonel in the US Marines and a veteran of World War II, the Korean War and the Vietnam War, and his mother, Rita O’Leary Gutheinz, was a Marine Corps enlisted woman. He holds six college degrees from Monterey Peninsula College, California State University, Sacramento (where he has been named a distinguished alumni), the University of Southern California and South Texas College of Law, and eight teaching credentials and ten law licenses. He is an attorney at law (1996 to present). He has taught at Central Texas College, Alvin Community College, Thurgood Marshall Law School, and for the University of Phoenix from 2002 to present. He is a former Commissioner on the Texas Commission on Fire Protection (2013–), having been appointed by Texas Governor Rick Perry. He has served as a Member of the Texas Council on Sex Offender Treatment (2009 to 2012). He has served as a Member of the Texas Criminal Justice Advisory Committee on Medical and Mental Impairments (2004 to 2008). He is a former advisor to the Coalition for an Airline Passenger Bill of Rights.

Gutheinz is also the founder of the law practice Gutheinz Law Firm, LLP in Friendswood, Texas. Two of his sons are partners in the firm, both of whom are also Army veterans.

== NASA Office of Inspector General cases ==
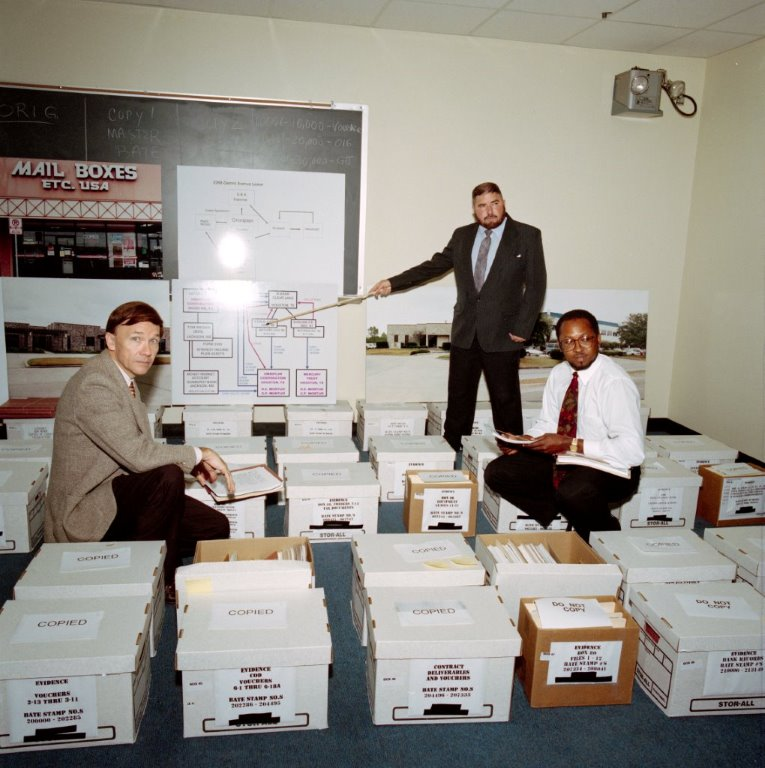
Joseph Gutheinz during the Omniplan Investigation

Gutheinz led the Omniplan task force investigation, which determined that Omniplan, a NASA contractor, was submitting false claims to NASA. The company had claimed it was leasing through three companies that were in fact shell companies controlled by Omniplan's owner Ralph Montijo. Gutheinz created the task force with 25 agents, inspectors, auditors and a financial analyst from eight agencies. The investigation led to the closure of seven companies, making it one of the highest profile in NASA history at that time. Gutheinz subsequently gave a speech to the International Business Forum about the Omniplan case, a speech attended by one of the principal defense attorneys in that case.

In the 1990s Gutheinz also served as the case agent in a joint investigation with the U.S. Department of Energy Office of Inspector General investigating the Arkansas Aerospace Education Center. Gutheinz led the Rockwell, United Space Alliance and Boeing North America task force investigation that resulted in a Federal civil lawsuit and an out of court settlement. In the civil suit the government alleged that Rockwell Space Operation's Company knew of Omniplan's fraudulent leases and failed to properly disclose that information to NASA or law enforcement. Gutheinz also investigated and arrested Jerry Alan Whittredge, an astronaut impersonator. Gutheinz also investigated the Russian space program and a fire and collision on the Mir space station.

=== Operation Lunar Eclipse ===
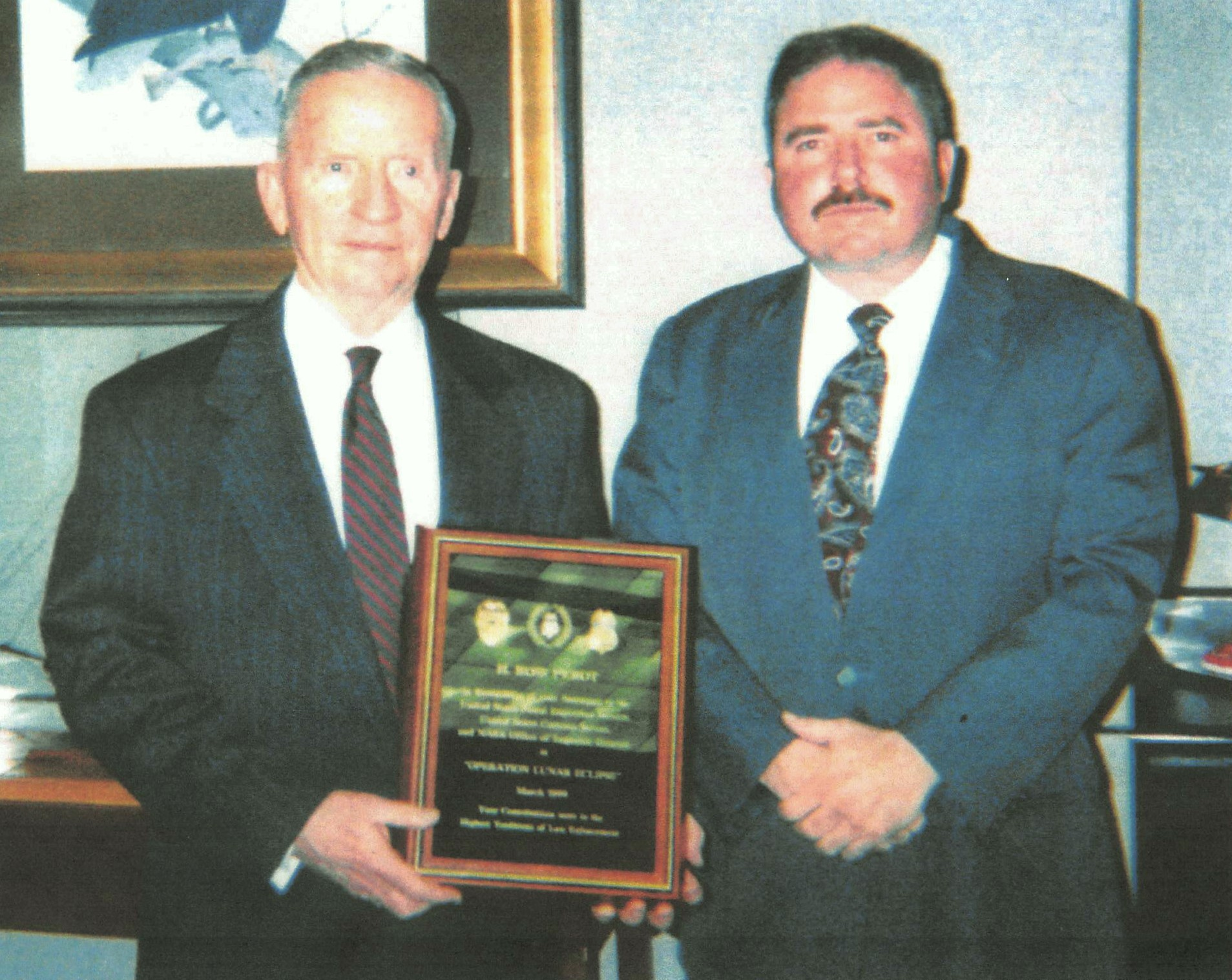
Joseph Gutheinz and Ross Perot

Gutheinz led and went undercover in Operation Lunar Eclipse, a sting operation to recover the Honduras Apollo 17 Goodwill Moon Rock. The Honduras Apollo 17 Goodwill Moon Rock had been offered to Gutheinz for $5 million, and Texas billionaire H. Ross Perot put up the money which facilitated the rock's recovery. The three agencies in Operation Lunar Eclipse were NASA Office of Inspector General (SSA Joseph Gutheinz aka Tony Coriasso), the United States Postal Inspection Service (Inspector Bob Cregger aka John Marta) and United States Customs (SA David Attwood and SA Dwight Weikel). Operation Lunar Eclipse was designed to catch con artists selling terrestrial rocks and dust and offering them as Apollo-era Moon rocks and lunar dust. Upon determining that the seller of the Honduras Apollo 17 Goodwill Moon Rock was selling a genuine Apollo-era Moon rock, Gutheinz investigated further and determined that there was a lack of accountability on all the Apollo 11 and 17 Moon Rocks and lunar dust that the Nixon, Ford and Carter Administrations gifted away to the states and nations of the world. Gutheinz had previously requested in 1998–1999 that NASA OIG attempt to account for the gifted Moon rocks and lunar dust. In December 2011 NASA OIG revealed the finding of an audit they conducted on loaned, not gifted, Apollo era lunar samples, which revealed a lack of accountability by both NASA and the recipient individuals and entities.

== Federal service awards ==
Gutheinz has received awards from six Federal agencies and one state for his governmental service. These awards include the NASA Exceptional Service Medal; the President's Council on Integrity and Efficiency Career Achievement Award; the NASA Superior Accomplishment Award (Special Act or Service) for his investigation of the Russian Mir Space Station fire and collision; a Special Commendation from the United States Attorney's Office for the Southern District of Texas as well as a Letter of Commendation from the Director of the FBI, for his leadership of the Omniplan task force investigation; a Certificate of Appreciation from the United States Attorney's Office for the Southern District of Texas for his leadership in the Lockheed-Martin investigation; a United States Department of Transportation Certificate of Achievement for Superior Performance for his investigation of the Denver Airport and pilots covered by the FBI/FAA pilot match program; and the Honor Graduate Pin from the Federal Law Enforcement Training Center as well as a Letter of Commendation from the Department of Treasury, for graduating first in his class in the Criminal Investigators Course at the Federal Law Enforcement Training Center in Glynco, Georgia.

== Aviation safety and security ==
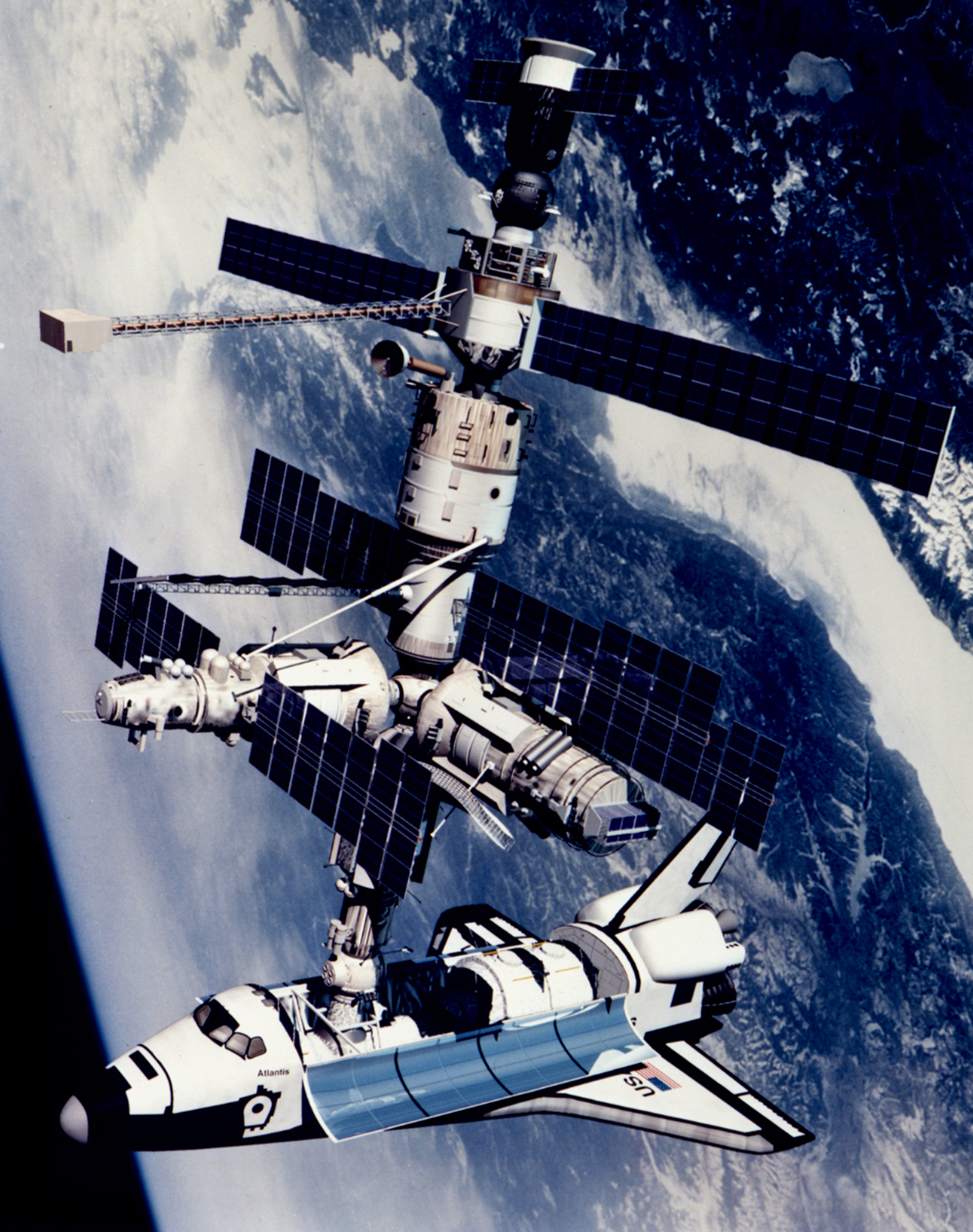
Technical rendition of STS-71 docked to Mir

Gutheinz has been on American news shows and been quoted in print publications about aviation safety and security. His activism over aviation safety and security began when he was a student aviator and saw a friend die in a helicopter crash at the U.S. Army flight school and continued thereafter with his past assignments as a Special Agent with The FAA Civil Aviation Security; a Special Agent for U.S. Department of Transportation Office of Inspector General; a Senior Special Agent with NASA Office of Inspector General and as an advisor and spokesperson for the Coalition for an Airline Passenger Bill of Rights. Gutheinz is an advocate for greater transparency in NASA. Since retiring from NASA, he has been critical of NASA's handling of the Columbia disaster and post-Columbia decisions. He has also been critical of the lack of policing for American air balloon pilots. Gutheinz has been a critic of the FAA’s lack of scrutiny over the foreign registration of aircraft.

== The Moon Rock Project ==
Gutheinz created and led The Moon Rock Project at the University of Phoenix, a project where criminal justice graduate students investigated and tracked down missing Apollo 11 lunar samples and Apollo 17 Goodwill Moon Rocks.

=== Moon rocks retained by state governors ===
Gutheinz and his students have assisted in successfully tracking down 79 missing Apollo 11 lunar samples and Apollo 17 Goodwill Moon Rocks and plaques, including three that were retained by Governor John Vanderhoof of Colorado, Governor Arch Moore, Jr. of West Virginia, and Governor Kit Bond of Missouri. On March 16, 2013, the Oprah Winfrey Network's television show Lost and Found aired a show titled "Unbelievable Mysteries Solved", which included Gutheinz, his former graduate student Sandra Shelton, and the recovery of the West Virginia Apollo 17 Goodwill Moon Rock.

=== Cyprus' Apollo 17 Goodwill Moon Rock ===
In 2009 Associated Press reporter Toby Sterling took interest in Gutheinz's Moon Rock Project and then enlisted the efforts of other AP reporters. With Gutheinz's assistance they tracked down additional Moon rocks. Gutheinz determined that both the Cyprus Apollo 11 lunar samples and Apollo 17 Goodwill Moon Rock, had both been taken or destroyed during Cyprus civil disturbances of 1973 and 1974, but later discovered that the Cyprus Apollo 17 Goodwill Moon Rock was in the possession of a deceased American diplomat's child whose father worked at the American Embassy in Cyprus. Following this he made public requests for the rock to be returned. On April 16, 2010 the NASA Office of Inspector General at Johnson Space Center took custody of the rock.

=== Canada's Apollo 17 Goodwill Moon Rock ===
In 2002, Gutheinz first assigned his University of Phoenix students to track down Canada's Apollo 17 Moon Rock. Their efforts discerned that the Moon rock and plaque were unaccounted for and believed stolen decades earlier. Gutheinz's students tracked down the Moon rock to a storage facility at the Canadian Museum of Nature. In 2009 Gutheinz and his students pressured Canada and the Museum to place the Canadian Apollo 17 Goodwill Moon Rock on display for the 40th anniversary Apollo 11. The Moon rock was transferred to the Canadian Science and Technology Museum and placed on display in 2009.

=== Other Moon rocks ===
In 2012 Gutheinz traveled to Buffalo, Texas, to look at an alleged Apollo era Moon rock being sold on EBay for $300,000. Gutheinz has also been critical of NASA's handling of Moon rocks to include loaned Moon rocks and the lack of security some temporary recipients have provided to America's Apollo era lunar samples.

=== Moon Rock Project in popular culture ===
Because of Gutheinz's efforts to find missing and stolen Moon rocks for over a decade he has acquired a nickname: "The Moon Rock Hunter". This nickname was originally given to Gutheinz by his graduate students, as a joking takeoff on "The Crocodile Hunter". Two documentaries have been made about his investigations, Moon for Sale (2007) and Lunarcy! (2012). Gutheinz's hunt for the late General Francisco Franco's Spanish Apollo 11 Moon Rock has earned him the description as the Van Helsing of Luna Traffickers by the Spanish press.

== Television and film ==
In 2013 he and Sandra Shelton were on one episode of Unbelievable Mysteries on the OWN Network. In 2014 Joe Gutheinz appeared on Lost History with Brad Meltzer on the History Channel. In 2015 a documentary about Joe Gutheinz and his students, Missing Moon Rocks, won an Emmy Award for Best Historical Documentary. From 2016 to 2019 Gutheinz appeared in fourteen episodes of NASA's Unexplained Files on the Science Channel. Joe Gutheinz is also acting in a film entitled Operation Lunar Eclipse about his 1998 undercover sting operation of the same name. Filming locations for the movie have included Kennedy Space Center, Marshall Space Flight Center, Washington D.C., Miami, and Honduras. A release date has yet to be determined.

== See also ==
- The Case of the Missing Moon Rocks
- Missouri lunar sample displays
- John D. Vanderhoof
- Arch A. Moore Jr.
- West Virginia lunar sample displays
- Illinois lunar sample displays
- Cyprus lunar sample displays
- Robert Pearlman
- Malta lunar sample displays
- Norway lunar sample displays
- Romania lunar sample displays
- Phoenix (NCIS)
- Jerry M. Linenger
