= West Virginia lunar sample displays =

Flag of West Virginia

The West Virginia lunar sample displays are two commemorative plaques consisting of small fragments of Moon specimen brought back with the Apollo 11 and Apollo 17 lunar missions and given in the 1970s to the people of the state of West Virginia by United States President Richard Nixon as goodwill gifts.

== Description ==
=== Apollo 11 ===
At the request of Nixon, NASA had about 250 presentation plaques made following Apollo 11 in 1969. Each included about four rice-sized particles of Moon dust from the mission totaling about 50 mg. The Apollo 11 lunar sample display has an acrylic plastic button containing the Moon dust mounted with the recipient's country or state flag that had been to the Moon and back. All 135 countries received the display, as did the 50 states of the United States and the U.S. provinces and the United Nations.

The plaques were given as gifts by Nixon in 1970.

=== Apollo 17 ===
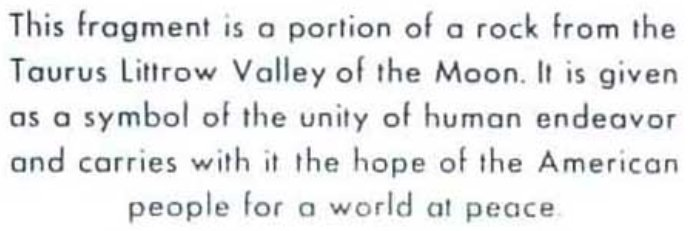
Message on Apollo 17 plaque

The sample Moon rock collected during the Apollo 17 mission was later named lunar basalt 70017, and dubbed the Goodwill rock. Pieces of the rock weighing about 1.14 grams were placed inside a piece of acrylic lucite, and mounted, along with a flag of the country which would receive it, that had flown on Apollo 17.

In 1973 Nixon had the plaques sent to 135 countries, and to the United States with its territories, as a goodwill gesture.

== History ==
The West Virginia Apollo 17 "goodwill Moon rocks" plaque display was presented to the people of the state of West Virginia in 1973 but went missing. In June 2010 a graduate student of Joseph Gutheinz, former special agent with NASA and self-appointed investigator of missing "Moon rocks" displays, tracked the West Virginia Apollo 17 lunar sample display to the home of a retired dentist, Robert Conner, in Morgantown, West Virginia. Conner had acquired the display from his late brother.

Conner speculated that the West Virginia Apollo 17 "goodwill Moon rocks" plaque display was received by his late brother, Troy Blaine Conner, Jr. of Moundsville, West Virginia. Conner believes the Apollo 17 lunar sample plaque came by way of former Governor Arch A. Moore Jr. through his connection with Troy's Washington law firm. Moore said he "might have given it to Troy 'to observe'."

Conner pointed out that the plaque was so plain and obscure sitting on a shelf at his home that he put no value on it. He didn't realize that the state of West Virginia was looking for it. As of 2012, the state had both the Apollo 11 and Apollo 17 lunar plaque displays.

== See also ==
- List of Apollo lunar sample displays
