= Lunarcy! =

- Film poster
- Directed by: Simon Ennis
- Produced by: Jonas Bell Pasht; Ron Mann; Jonah Bekhor
- Cinematography: Jonathan Bensimon
- Edited by: Matt Lyon
- Production company: Citizen Jones Production
- Distributed by: Films We Like (Canada)
- Release date: September 8, 2012 (TIFF)
- Running time: 80 minutes
- Country: Canada
- Language: English

Lunarcy! is a 2012 Canadian documentary film directed by Simon Ennis. The film draws from a cast of astronauts, entrepreneurs and dreamers who each have a unique connection to the Moon.

The film premiered at the 2012 Toronto Film Festival on September 8, and screened at South by Southwest on March 13, 2013, It was picked up for distribution in Canada by Films We Like.

== Participants ==
- Alan Bean, astronaut and one of the twelve people to have walked on the Moon
- Christopher Carson, hopes to be the first person to leave Earth with the intention of never returning
- Matthew Goodman, author of The Sun and the Moon
- Joseph Gutheinz, founder of the Moon Rock Project
- Dennis Hope, claims personal ownership of the Moon.
- Peter Kokh, secretary of the Moon Society and editor of the Moon Miners’ Manifesto
- Jaymie Matthews, astrophysics professor at the University of British Columbia.

== Release ==
The film received generally favorable reviews. Phil Brown for ThatShelf called the film "a hilarious, sweet, and oddly touching depiction of the joys and fulfillment of obsession." NOW Magazine's Norman Wilner wrote that the film "feels like it could have been filmed by a young Errol Morris." Daniel Pratt for Exclaim! praised the film, writing "With its quirky soundtrack, fun animation and equally enjoyable stock footage, Lunarcy! is a unique documentary infused with comedy, yet it presents some visionary ideas that can't be completely disregarded."

== See also ==
- Colonization of the Moon
- Moon tree
- NASA
- Sex on the Moon
- Stolen and missing Moon rocks
- The Case of the Missing Moon Rocks
