= Cyprus lunar sample displays =

Cyprus flag

The Cyprus lunar sample displays are part of two commemorative plaques consisting of tiny fragments of Moon specimens brought back with the Apollo 11 and Apollo 17 lunar missions. These plaques were given to the people of the Republic of Cyprus by United States President Richard Nixon as goodwill gifts.

== Description ==
=== Apollo 11 ===
At the request of Nixon, NASA had about 250 presentation plaques made following Apollo 11 in 1969. Each included about four rice-sized particles of Moon dust from the mission totaling about 50 mg. The Apollo 11 lunar sample display has an acrylic plastic button containing the Moon dust mounted with the recipient's country or state flag that had been to the Moon and back. All 135 countries received the display, as did the 50 states of the United States and the U.S. provinces and the United Nations.

The plaques were given as gifts by Nixon in 1970.

=== Apollo 17 ===
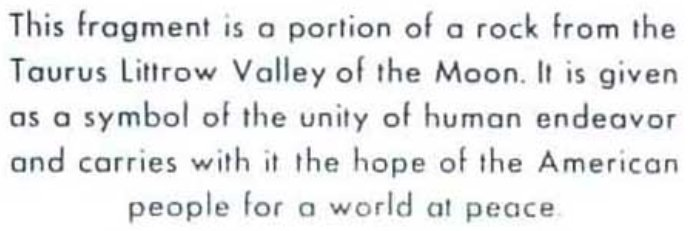
Message on Apollo 17 plaque

The sample Moon rock collected during the Apollo 17 mission was later named lunar basalt 70017, and dubbed the Goodwill rock. Pieces of the rock weighing about 1.14 grams were placed inside a piece of acrylic lucite, and mounted, along with a flag of the country which would receive it, that had flown on Apollo 17.

In 1973 Nixon had the plaques sent to 135 countries, and to the United States with its territories, as a goodwill gesture.

== History ==
An international mystery of how the Cyprus goodwill Moon rock was offered for sale on the black market begins in 1960. During a coup of 1974 the Presidential Palace burned. The Cyprus "Moon rock" plaque from Apollo 17 was considered lost at that time. Subsequent information revealed that the display was never actually given to the Cyprus government, rather was kept at the US embassy in Nicosia during the 1974 coup d'état (Turkish invasion), which caused a delayed presentation of the plaque. But American diplomatic personnel left the island and the display went missing, showing up on the black market years later, in the hands of the son of a previous US diplomat.

NASA reported in May 2010 that the Office of Inspector General recovered the Apollo 17 plaque and are preparing to re-gift it. According to Robert Pearlman, the whereabouts of the Cyprus Apollo 11 goodwill lunar display are unknown.

== See also ==
- List of Apollo lunar sample displays
