= Jaymie Matthews =

Canadian astrophysicist

Jaymie Mark Matthews (born 1958 in Chatham, Ontario) is a Canadian astrophysicist, asteroseismologist, and popularizer of science.

== Education and career ==
Matthews received his bachelor's degree from the University of Toronto in 1979. Matthews then studied in the University of Western Ontario's department of astronomy & astrophysics, receiving a master's degree in 1982 and doctoral degree in 1987 under the supervision of Dr. W. Wehlau. He was a postdoc at the University of British Columbia (UBC) from 1988 to 1990 and Attaché de recherche at the Université de Montreal from 1990 to 1992. At UBC, Matthews has held the position of assistant professor from 1992 to 2000, associate professor from 2000 to 2008, and full professor from 2008 to the present.

He is the principal investigator for the Canadian Space Agency’s MOST project, a space telescope project yielding observations in asteroseismology and in detection of visible-light signatures from extrasolar planets. He has been a member of several Canadian scientific committees and has been an invited speaker at many international scientific meetings. Matthews has made frequent appearances in the news media. He "posed in multiple guises (from a superhero flying in the ozone layer to an X-ray version of Austin Powers) in the Discovery Channel documentary series "Light: More Than Meets The Eye"."

== See also ==
- Lunarcy! Canadian documentary film
