= Regalia of Romania =

Royal coronation items

The Regalia of Romania are a set of items which were used for the coronation of the kings and queens of Romania. They are kept in the National Museum of Romanian History in Bucharest and consist of the Royal Crown (the Steel Crown of Romania), the Crown of Queen Elizabeth, the Crown of Queen Maria, orbs, the Scepter of King Ferdinand I, the Scepter of King Carol II, the Sword of King Carol I and the Royal Mantle.

== Steel Crown ==
The Romanian Steel Crown, used for the coronation of Romanian kings, was cast from steel from a Turkish cannon captured by the Romanian Army in the Romanian War of Independence (1877–1878) during the Siege of Plevna.

It was used on May 10, 1881, during the king's coronation and the proclamation of Romania as a kingdom; on October 15, 1922, in the coronation of King Carol I's nephew and successor, King Ferdinand I; and in the coronation of Romania's last king, Michael I, on September 6, 1940.

== The Crown of Queen Elizabeth ==
Crown of Queen Elizabeth of Romania
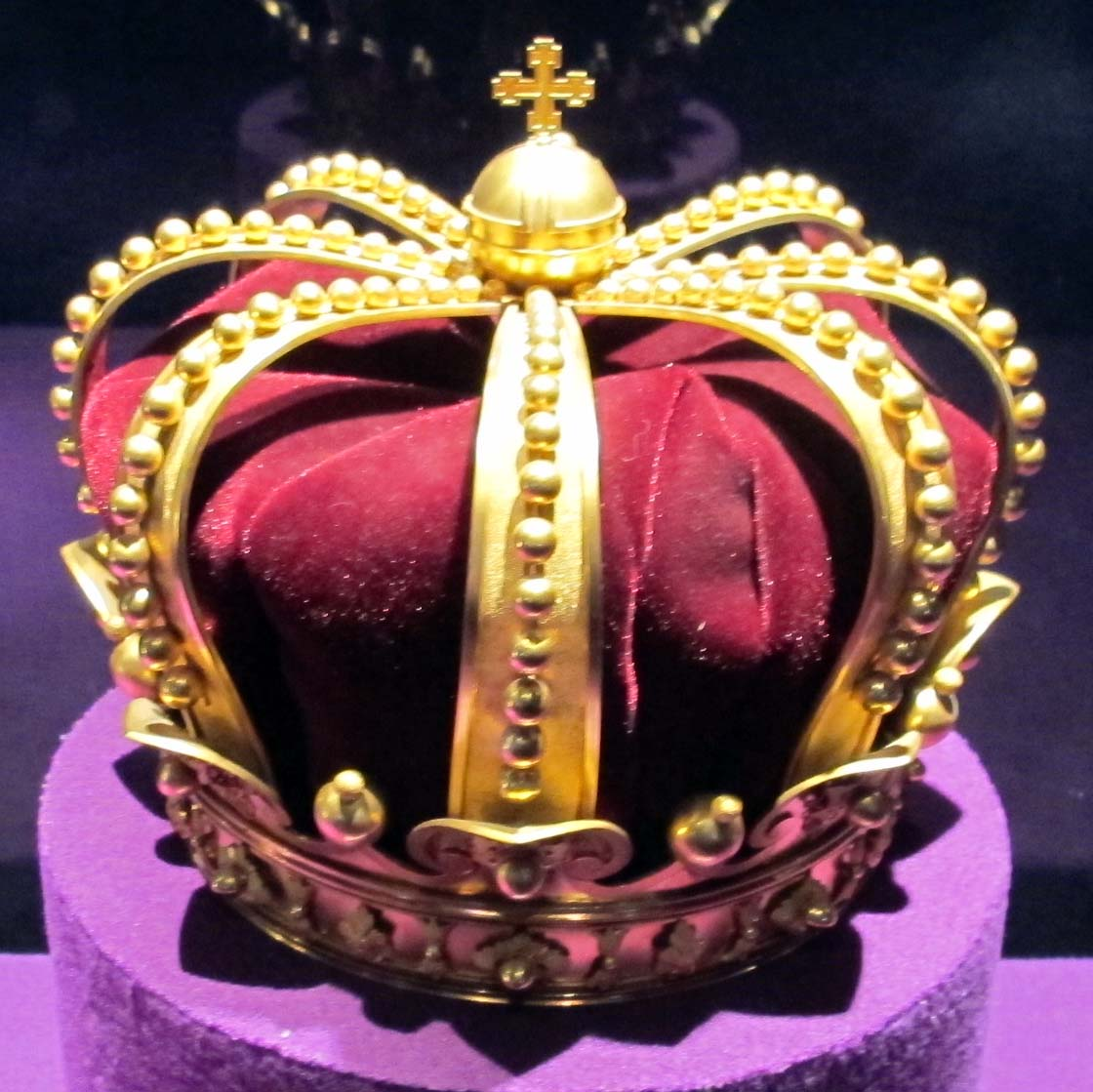

Details
- Country: Romania
- Made: 1881
- Arches: 8
- Material: Gold
- Notable stones: None

The Crown of Queen Elizabeth was made of gold at the Arsenalul Armatei for the occasion of the proclamation of the Kingdom and the coronation of King Carol I and Queen Elizabeth in 1881. The crown follows a medieval design similar to that of the Royal Steel Crown, and it, too, does not contain precious stones.

== The Crown of Queen Maria ==
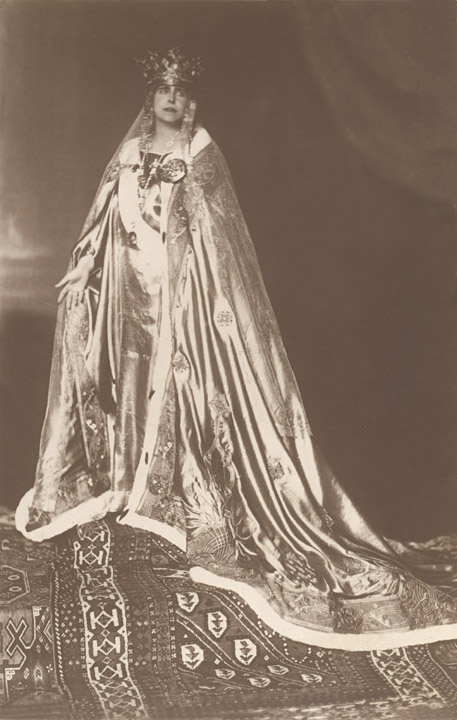
Coronation portrait of Queen Maria wearing the Romanian Crown of Queen Maria

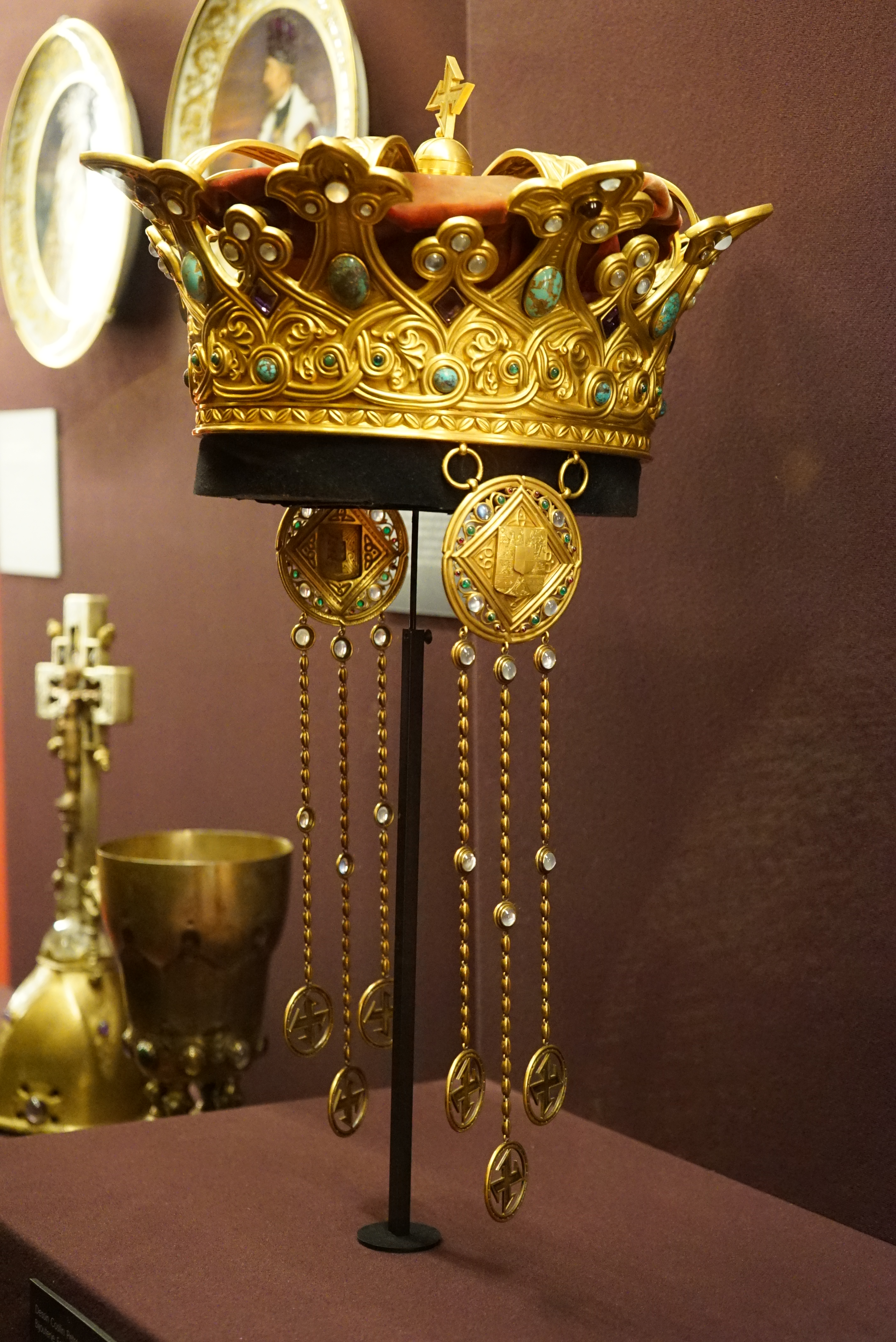
The Crown of Queen Maria

The Crown of Queen Maria was made of gold mined from the Transylvania region of Romania. It was constructed specifically for the occasion of the coronation of King Ferdinand I and Queen Maria in 1922 at Alba-Iulia. The Crown has a very original design. Rather than wearing the crown of Queen Elizabeth, Queen Maria had reportedly told her husband "I want nothing modern that another queen might have. Let mine be all medieval." The new crown was modeled on one having belonged to Milica Despina of Wallachia, the consort of a 16th-century Wallachian prince. It contains rubies, emeralds, amethyst, turquoise and opals and weighs 4 pounds (1.8 kg). Grains of wheat decorate the base of the crown topped by eight large and eight small flower ornaments connected by interlacing branches. A globe and cross sit atop the eight arches above the flower ornaments and a pendulum, supposedly copied from ancient Byzantine head ornaments, hangs from either side of the headband just above the ear, each bearing the coat of arms of Romania. From each of these pendula hang three chains, each with a cross within a gold circle at the end.

== The Scepter of King Ferdinand I ==
The Scepter of Ferdinand I, was constructed in Alba-Iulia for the coronation of King Ferdinand I in 1922. It was presented to the king on May 10, 1920 by six girls from the orphanage Radu Voda, and is inscribed "King Ferdinand I, King of the Romanians is presented this gift by his people as a reward for his worthiness and good governance of the country during the years 1916-1919". At the top are four images of peasants in national costumes representing Transylvania, Bessarabia, Bukovina and the ancient kingdom Romania. The head of an eagle sits atop the scepter and symbolizes the Latin origin of the Romanians.

== The Scepter of King Carol II ==
The Scepter of Carol II was presented by Romanian Army officials to King Carol II in 1940 for the 10th anniversary of his ascension to the throne. This scepter is similar to the Scepter of Ferdinand I.

== The Sword of King Carol I ==
The Sword of King Carol I of Romania was a present to King Carol I by Ottoman Sultan Abdulaziz. Its blade is crafted from Damascus steel and it has a gold plated handgrip. The sheath contains 1140 jewels, including 46 diamonds.

== Gallery ==
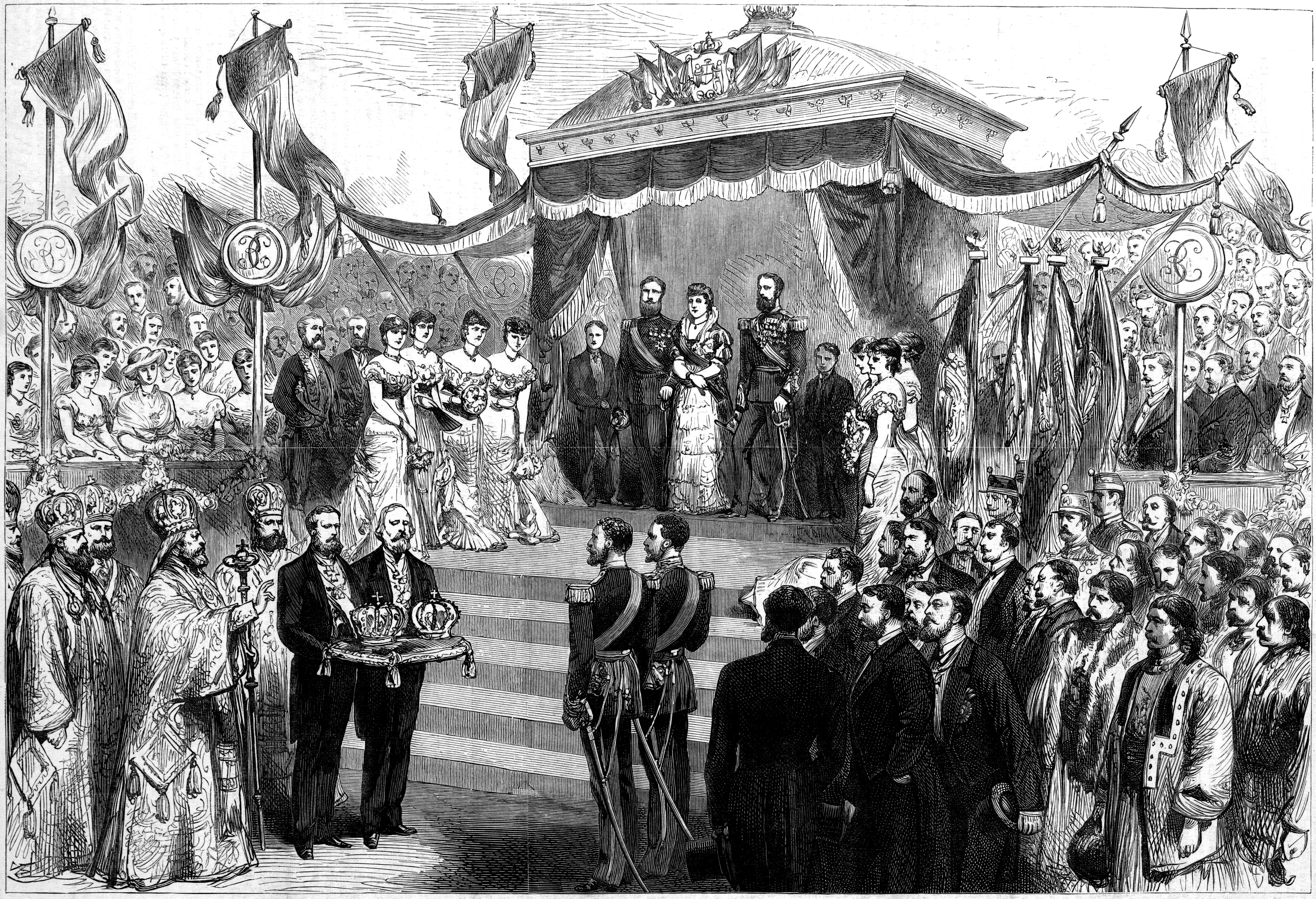
The coronation of King Carol I

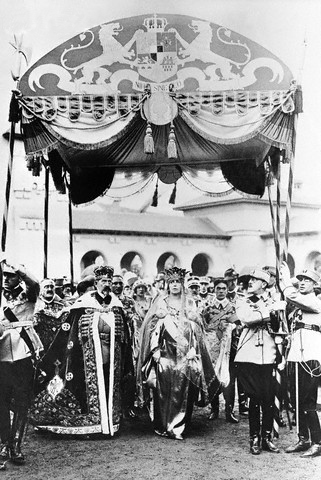
The coronation of King Ferdinand I

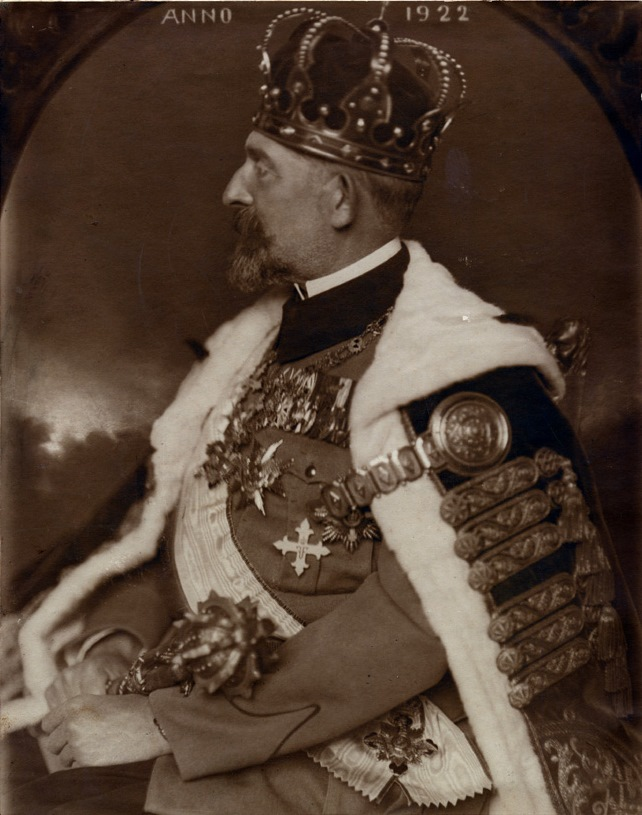
Coronation photo of King Ferdinand I

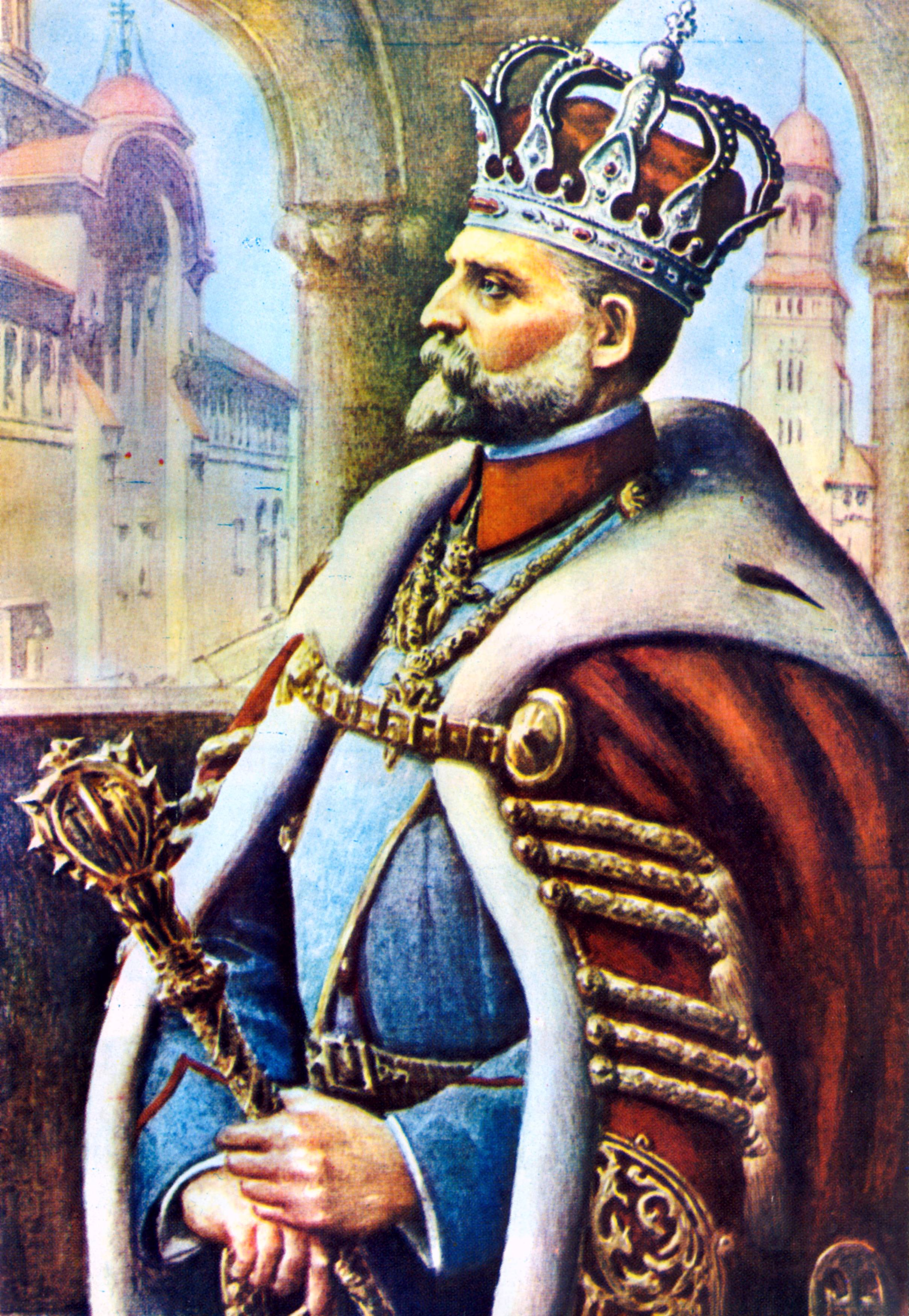
King Ferdinand I in full regalia

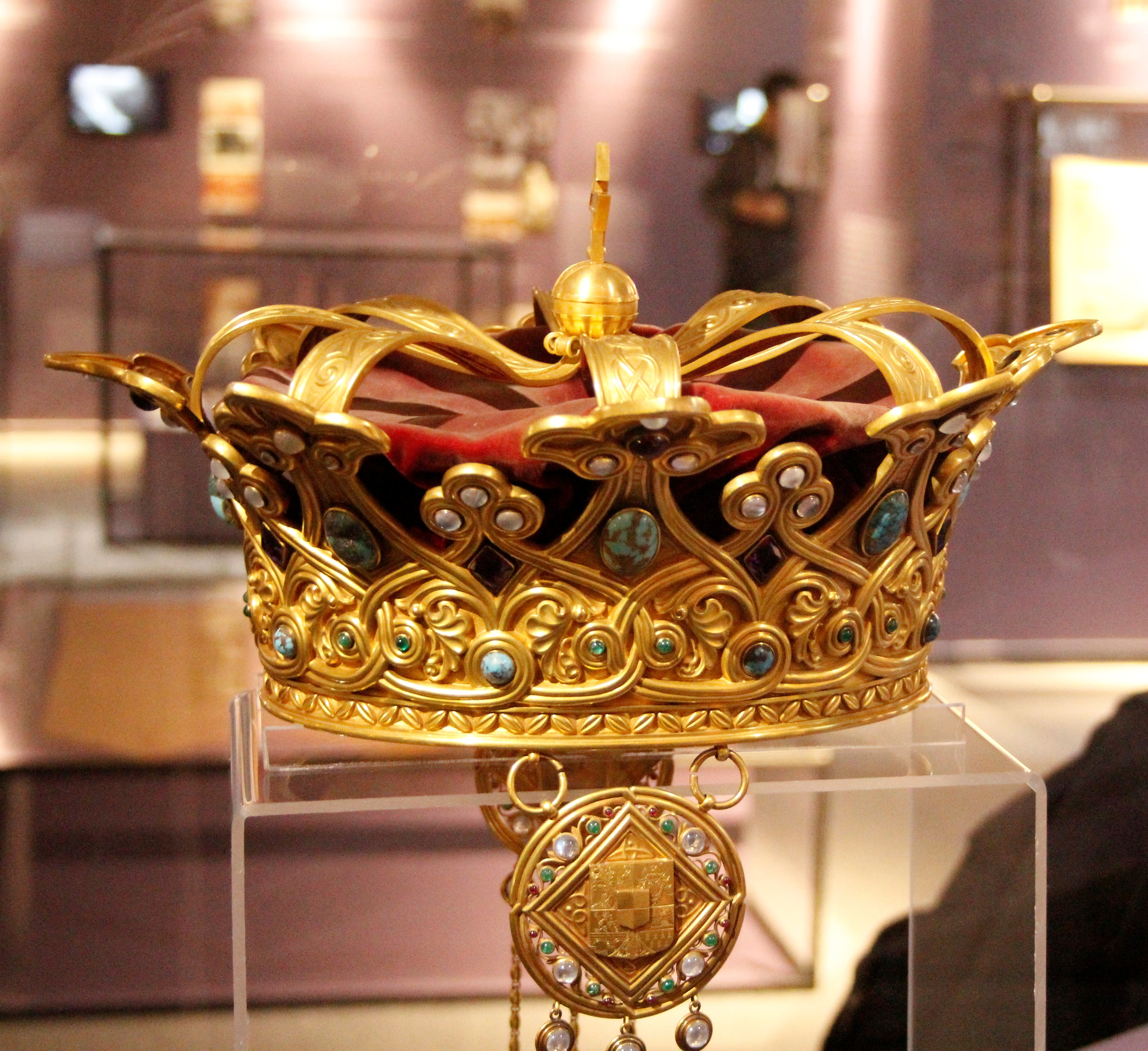
The crown of Queen Maria
