= National History Museum of Romania =

Museum in Bucharest, Romania

- Muzeul Național de Istorie a României
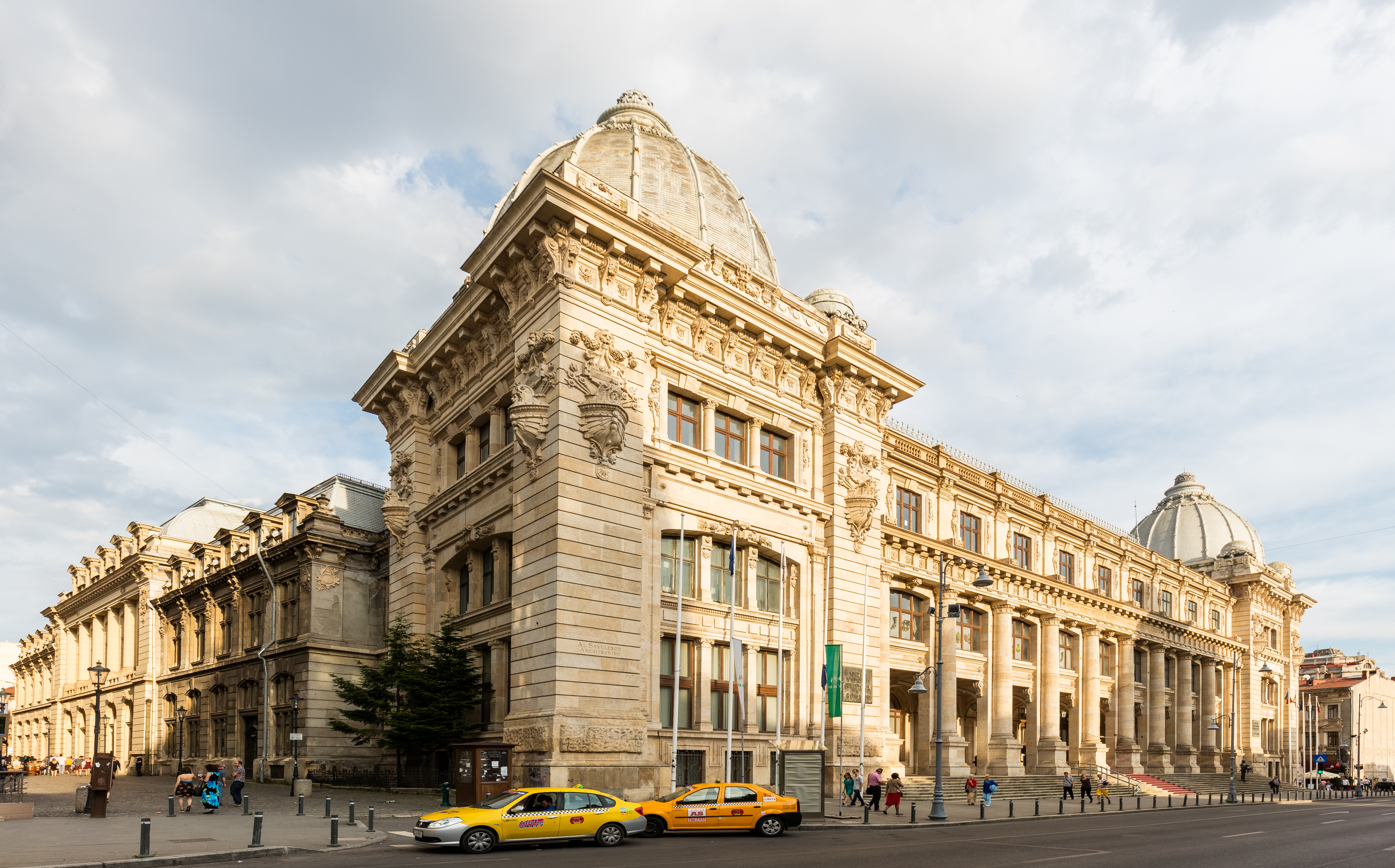
- National History Museum of Romania
- Established: 1970
- Location: 12 Calea Victoriei, Bucharest, Romania
- Coordinates: 44°25′53.51″N 26°5′50.01″E
- Website: www.mnir.ro

The National History Museum of Romania (Romanian: Muzeul Național de Istorie a României) is a museum located at 12 Calea Victoriei in Bucharest, Romania, which contains Romanian historical artifacts from prehistoric times up to modern times.

== Overview ==
The museum is located inside the former Postal Services Palace, which also houses a philatelic museum. With a surface of over 8,000 square metres (86,000 square feet), the museum has approximately 60 valuable exhibition rooms. The permanent displays include a plaster cast of the entirety of Trajan's Column, the Romanian Crown Jewels, and the Pietroasele treasure.

The building was authorized, in 1892, and the architect, Alexandru Săvulescu was sent with the postal inspector, Ernest Sturza, to tour various postal facilities of Europe for the design. The final sketches were influenced primarily by the postal facility in Geneva. Built in an eclectic style, it is rectangular with a large porch on a high basement and three upper floors. The stone façade features a portico supported by 10 Doric columns and a platform consisting of 12 steps spanning the length of the building. There are many allegorical sculptural decorative details.

As of 2012, the museum is undergoing extensive restoration work and is only partially open; a late medieval archaeological site was discovered under the building.

On 25 January 2025, the Helmet of Coțofenești, a Geto-Dacian helmet that was loaned by the museum to the Drents Museum in Assen, the Netherlands, was stolen along with three other loaned gold artifacts following a heist and remains missing. Following the theft, the loan agreement was met with criticism in Romania. On 28 January, the Romanian minister of Culture Natalia Intotero fired the museum's director, Ernest Oberländer, saying that he had "failed to adequately protect the national heritage".

== Gallery ==
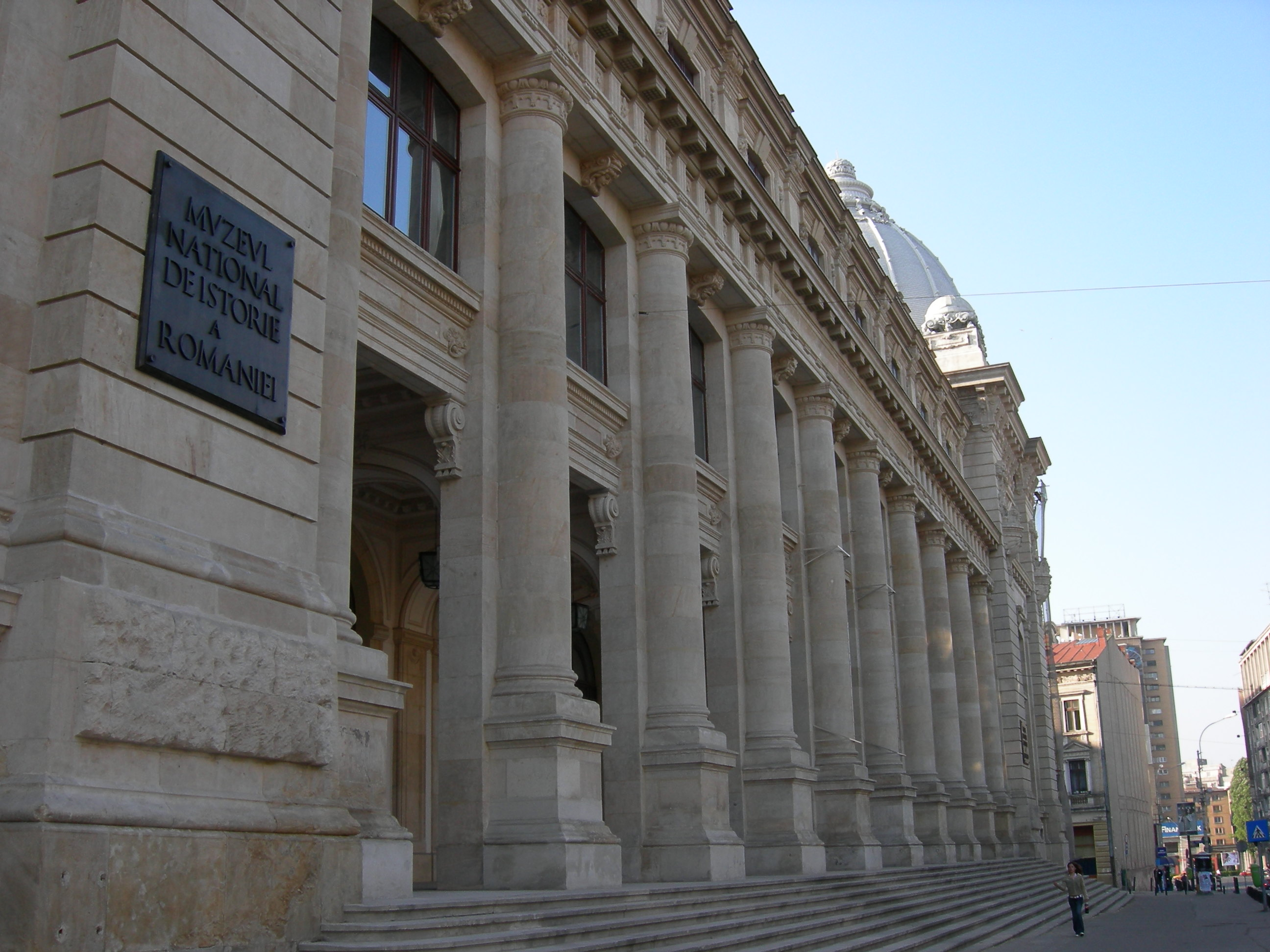
The main view of the building

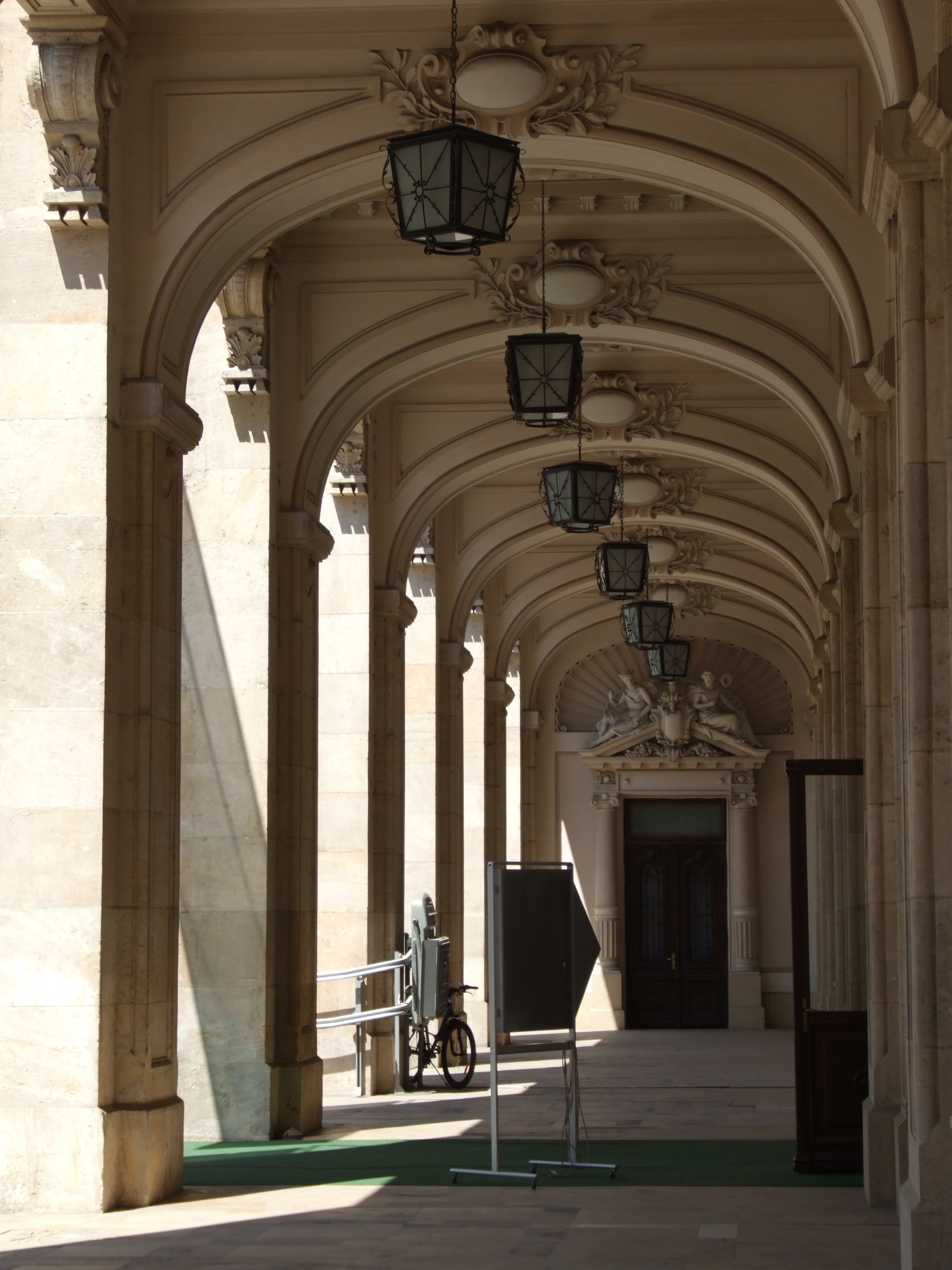
Arcades

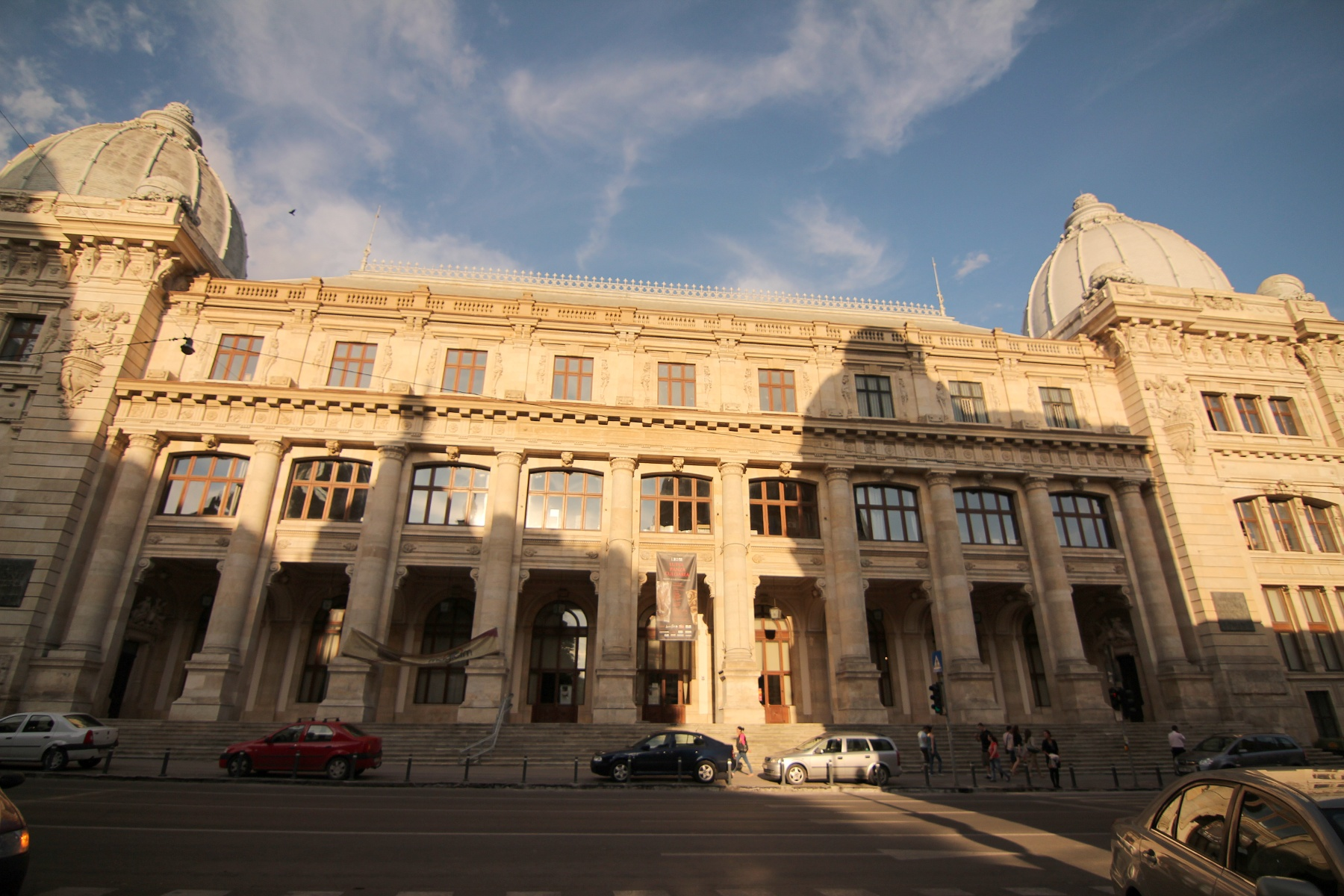
Frontal view

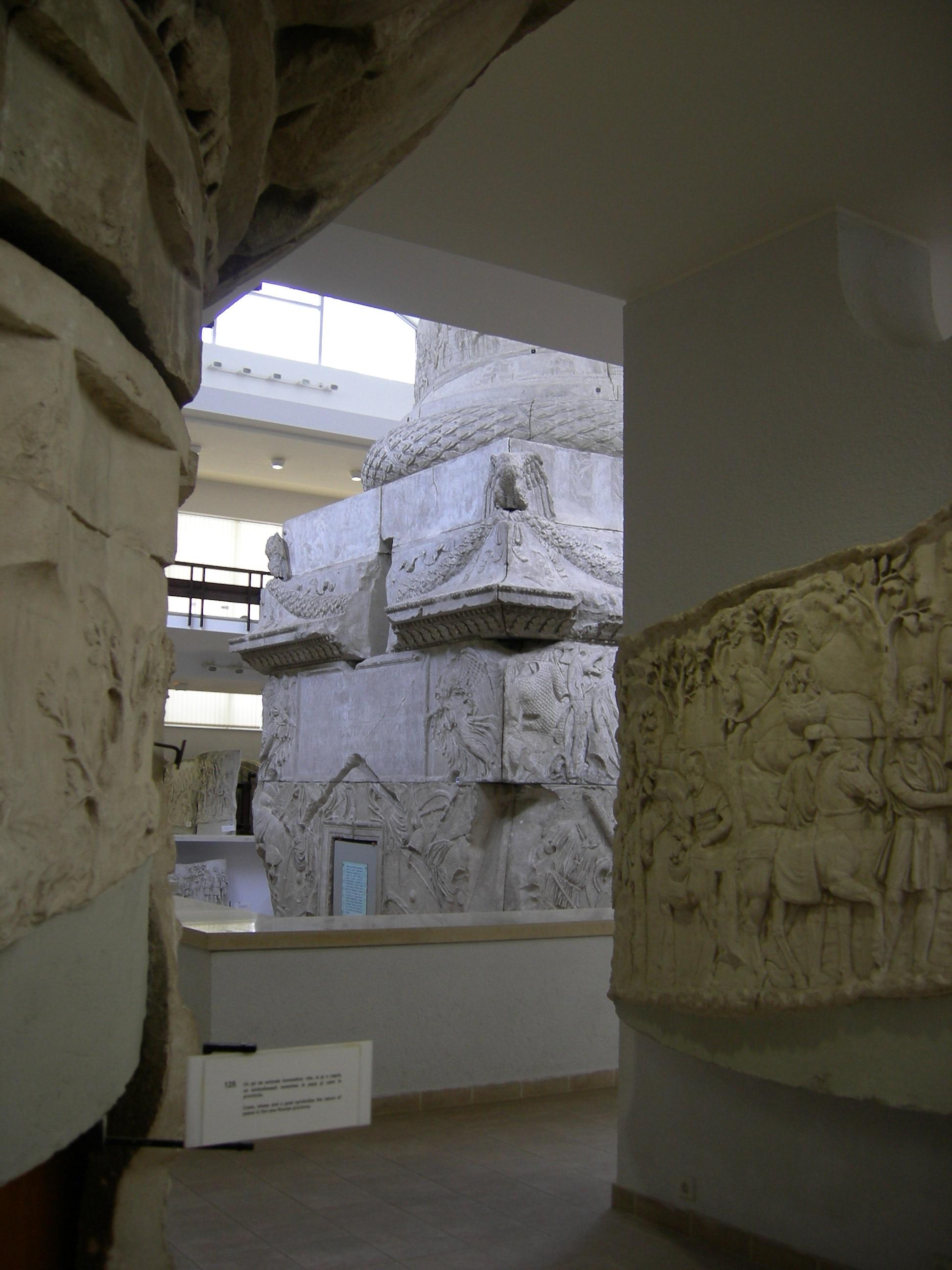
Trajan's Column: permanent exhibit

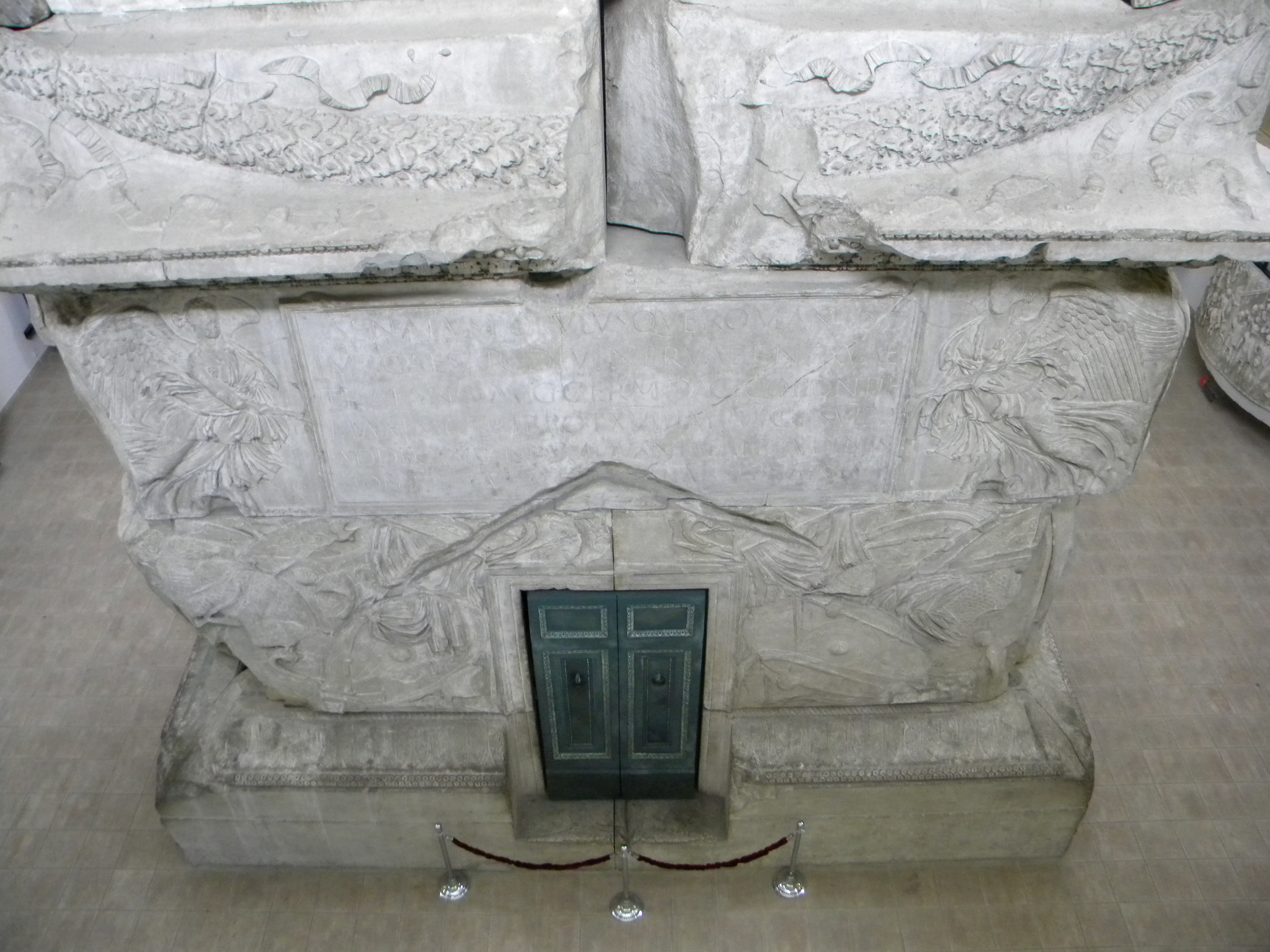
Trajan's Column

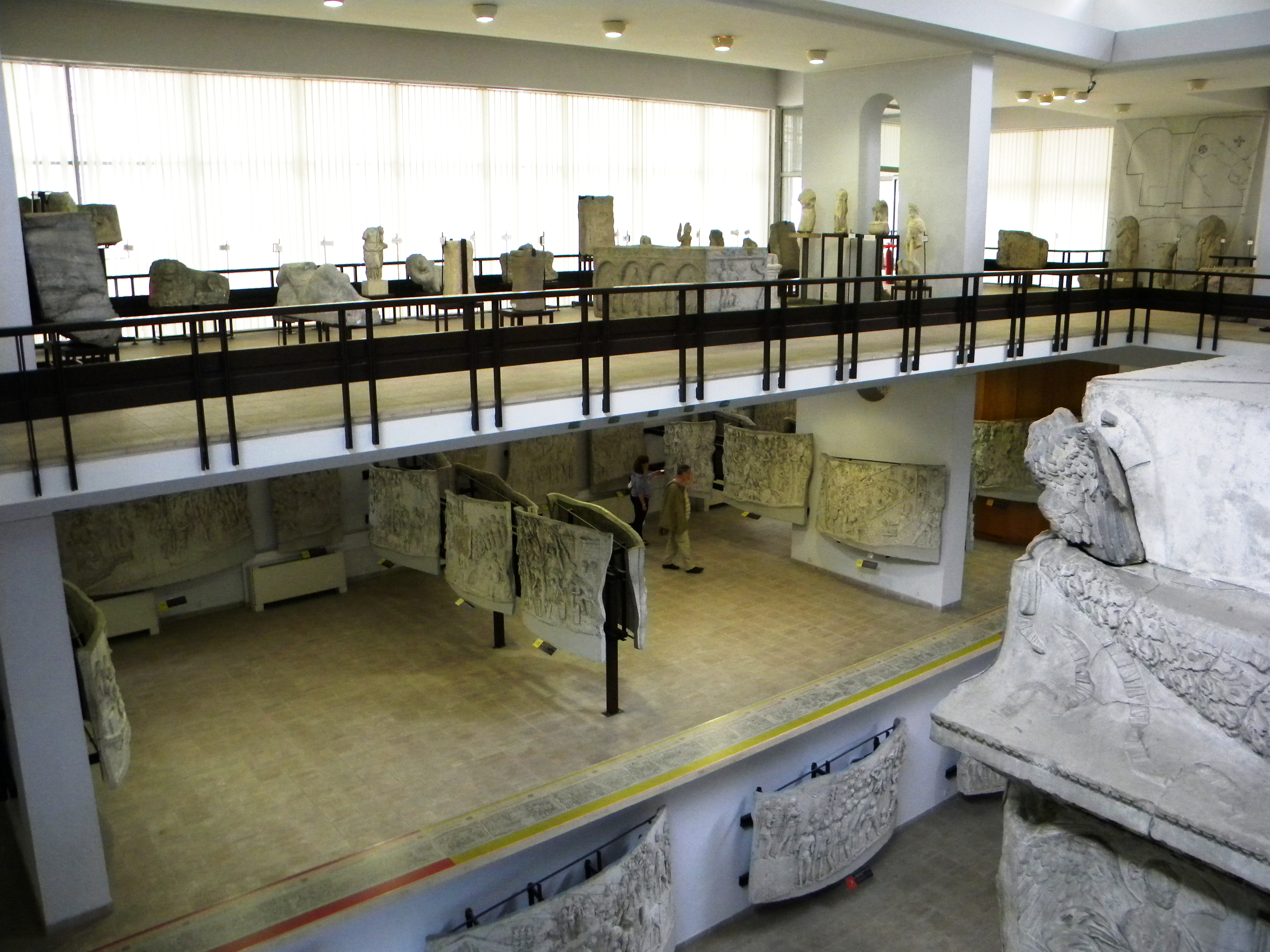

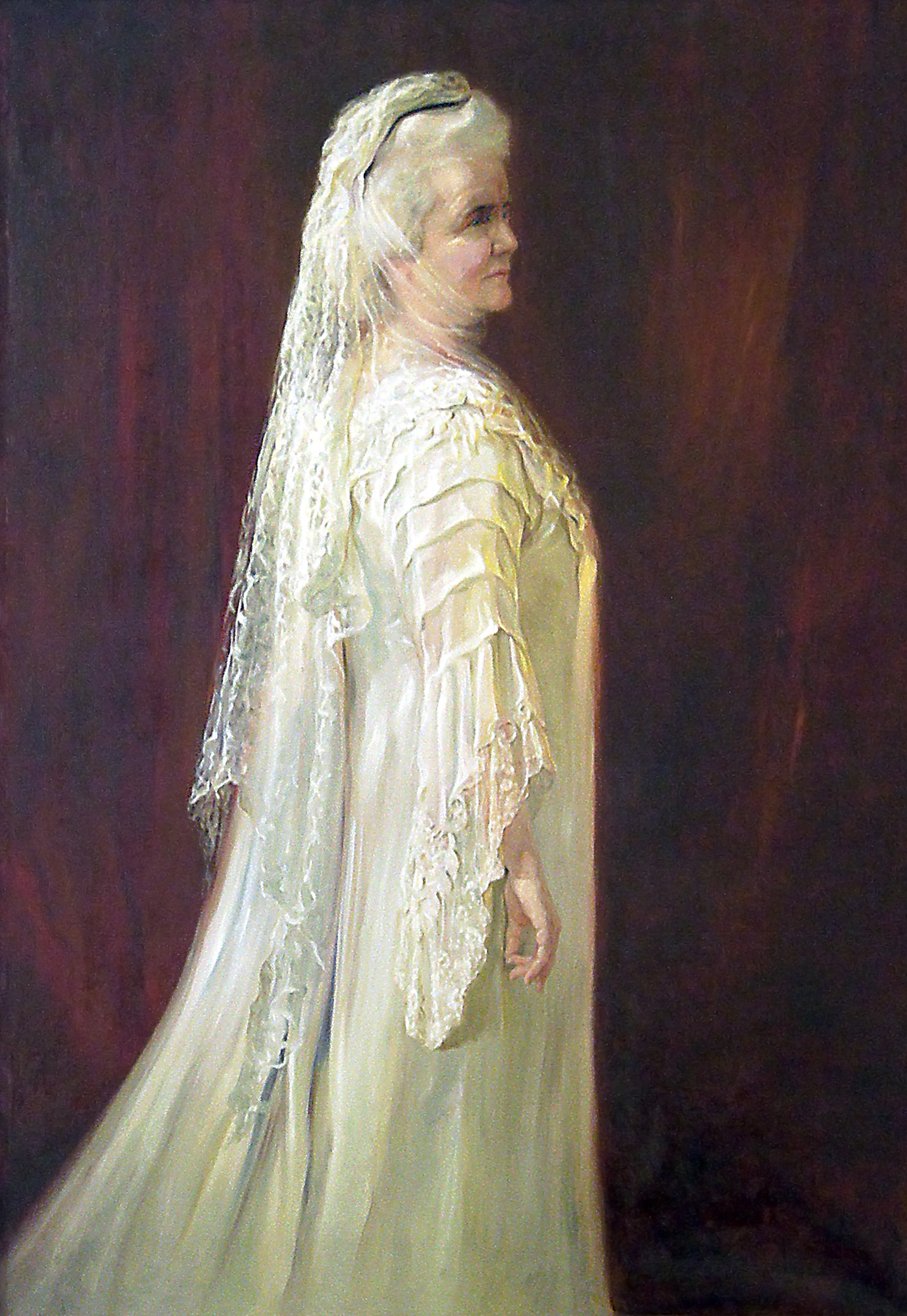
A portrait of Elisabeth of Wied in the museum

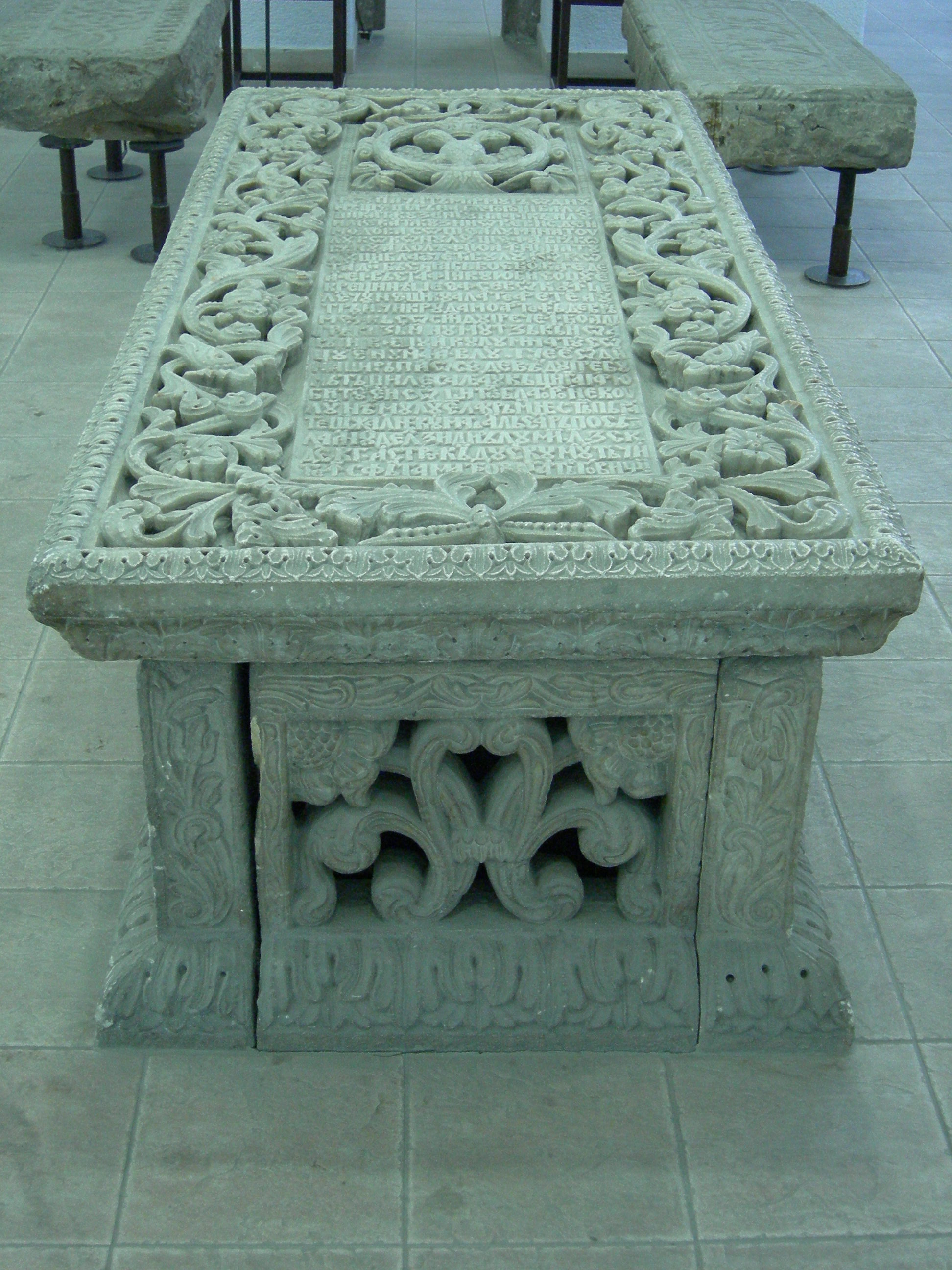
The sarcophagus of Princess Bălașa Cantacuzino

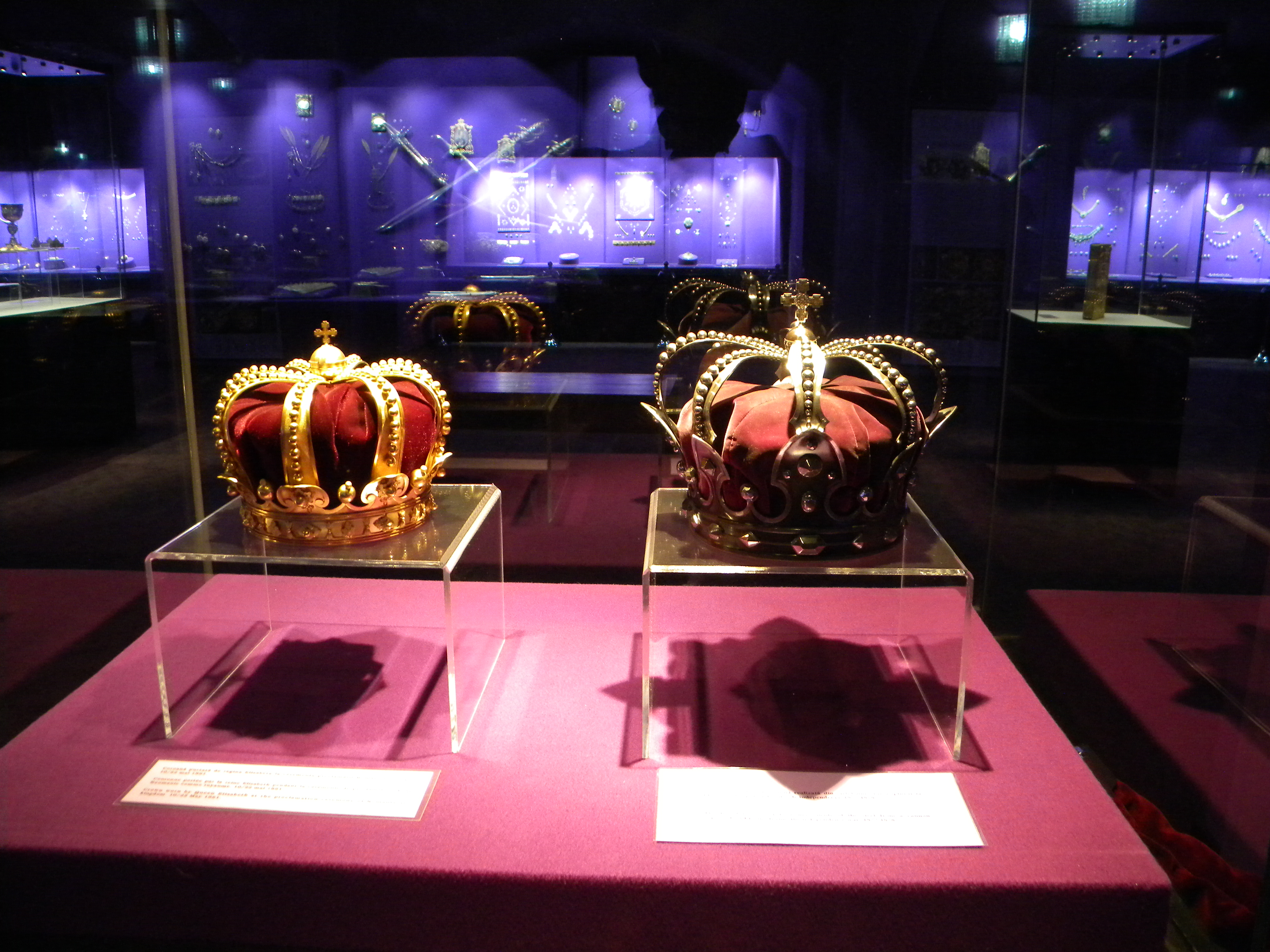
The Steel Crown and the Crown of Queen Elizabeth

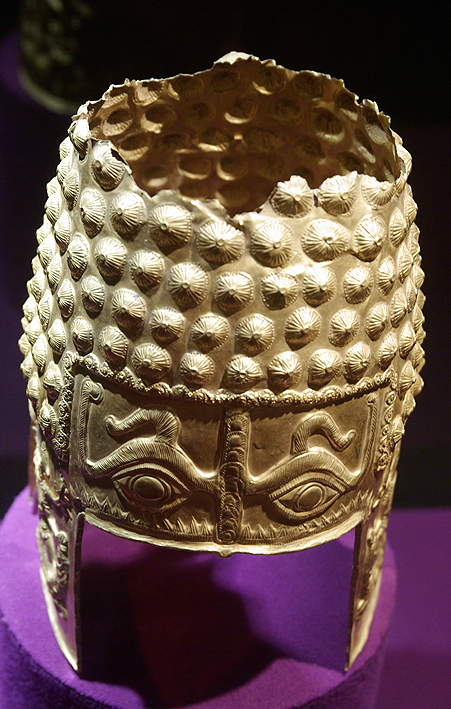
The Helmet of Coțofenești, a Geto-Dacian helmet of the early 4th century BC, stolen while on loan to the Drents Museum, the Netherlands, in 2025, recovered in April 2026.

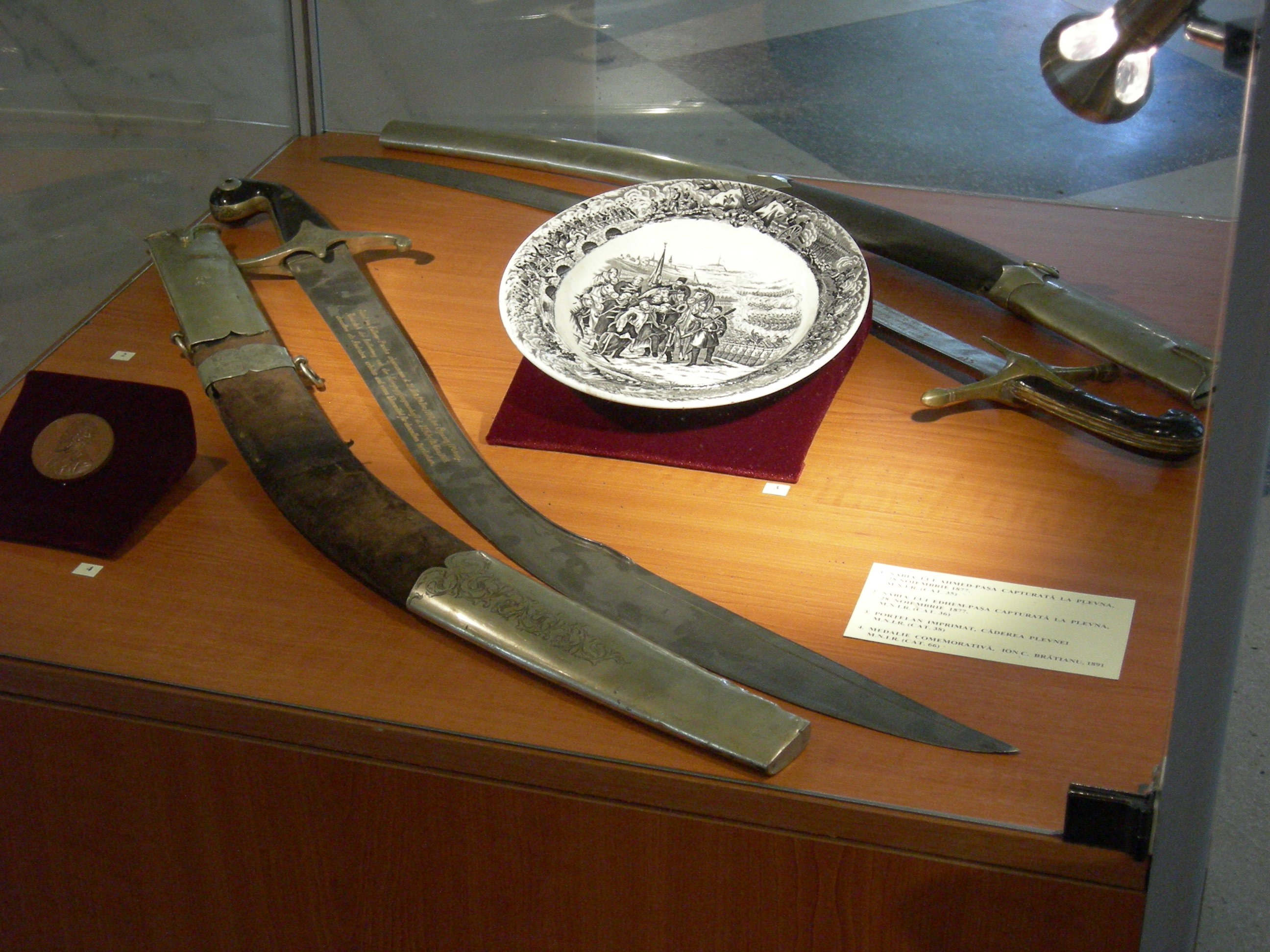
Various objects associated with the Siege of Plevna

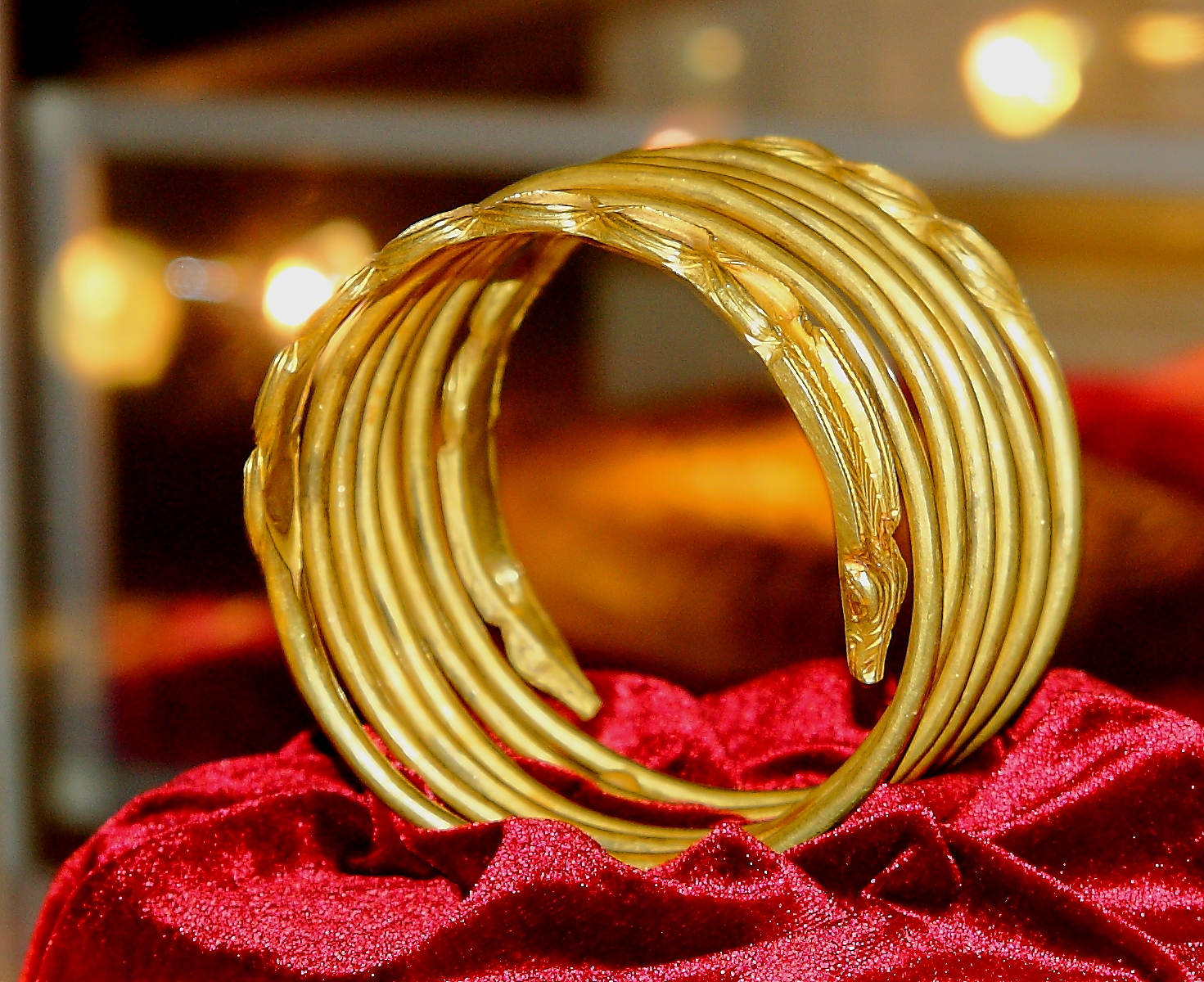
Dacian bracelet

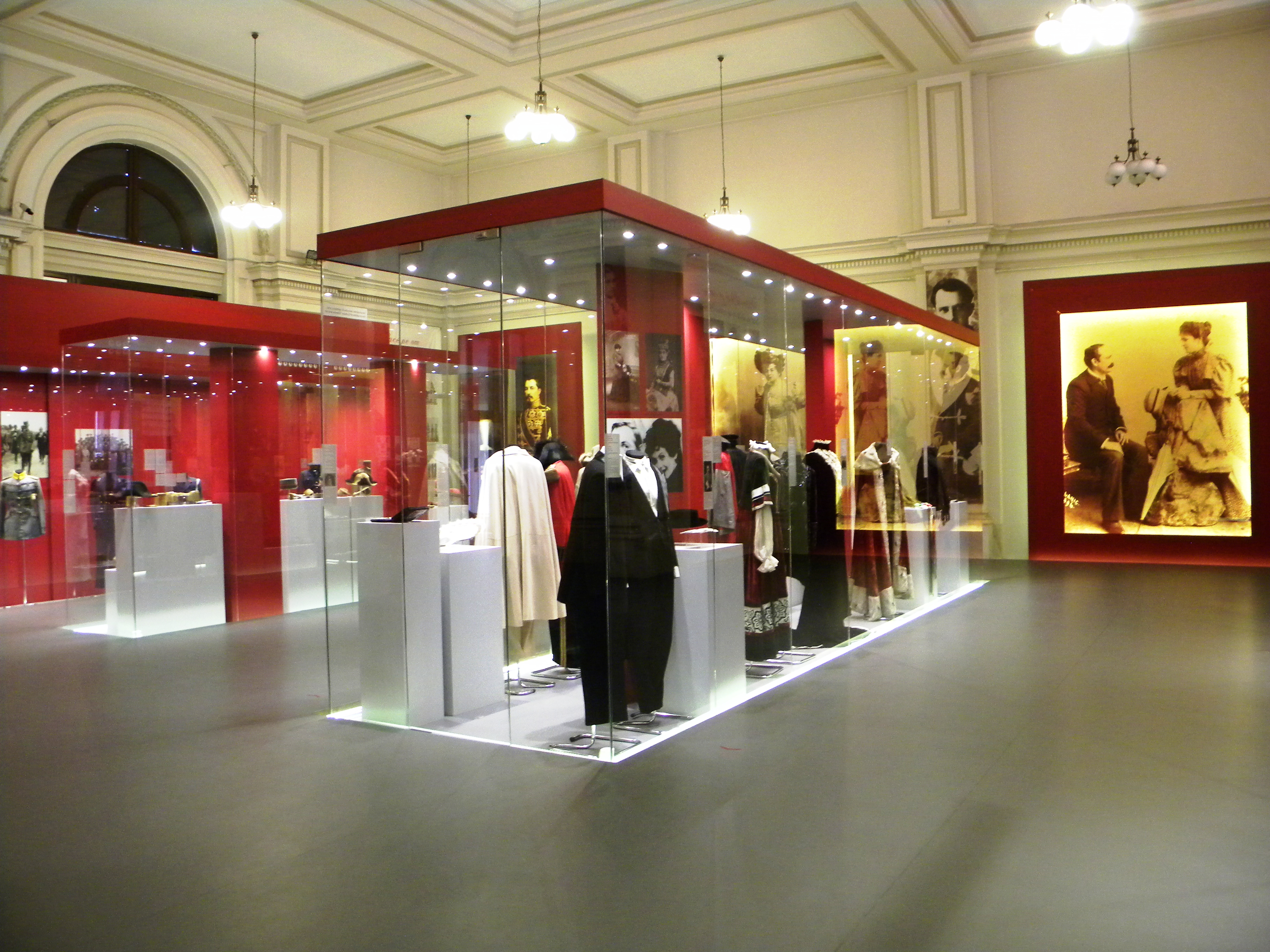
Costumes hall

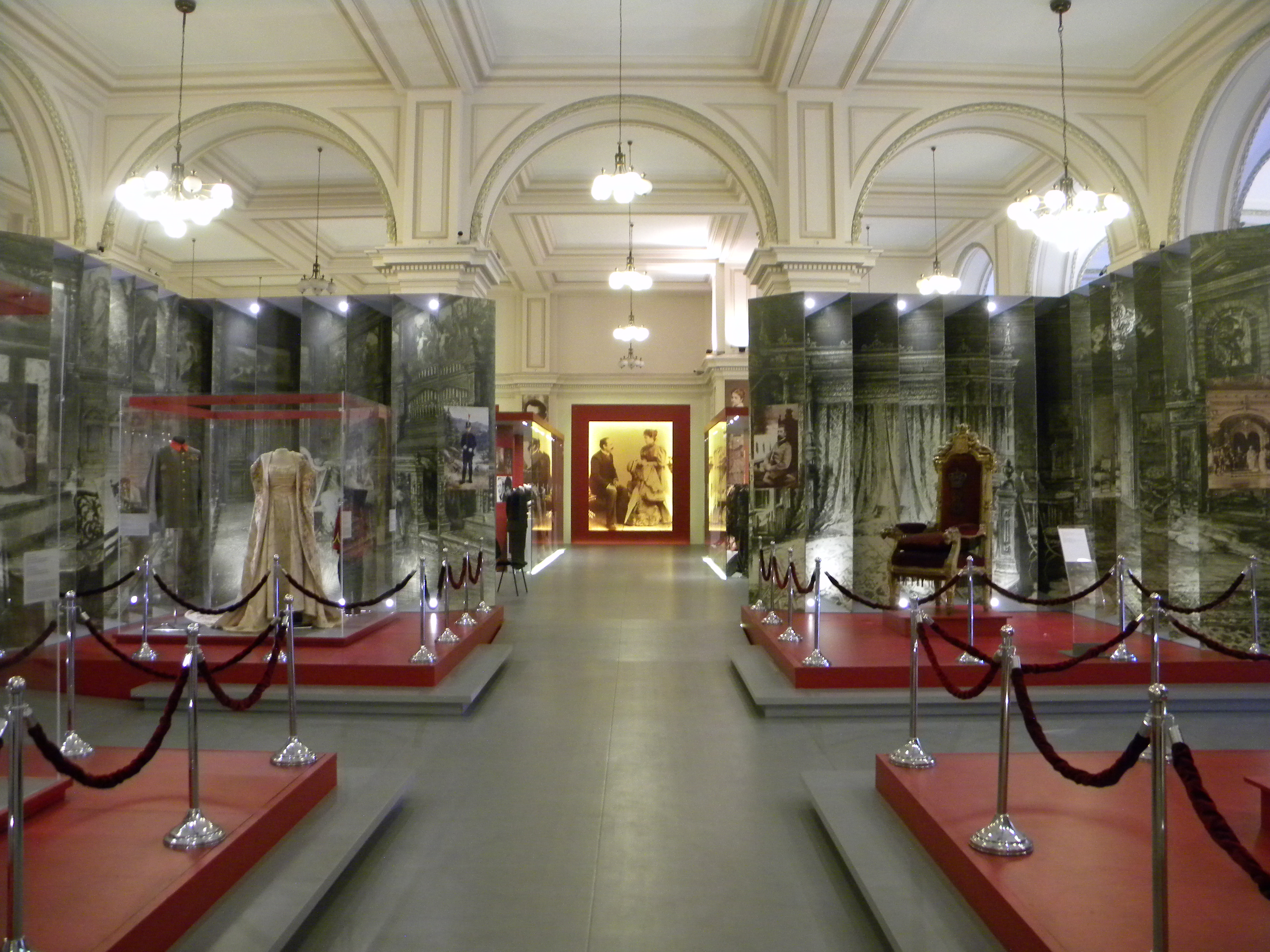

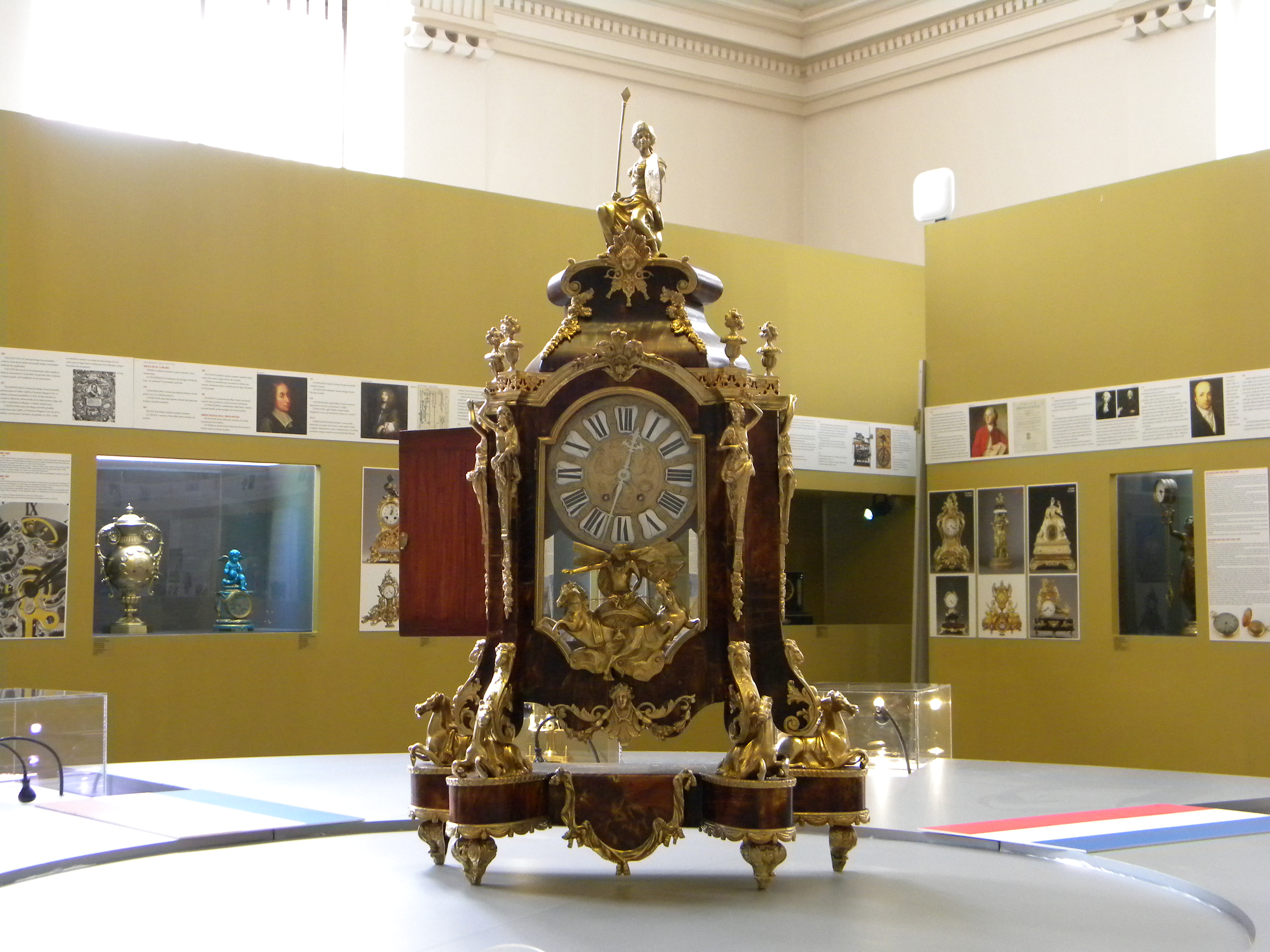
Watches exhibition

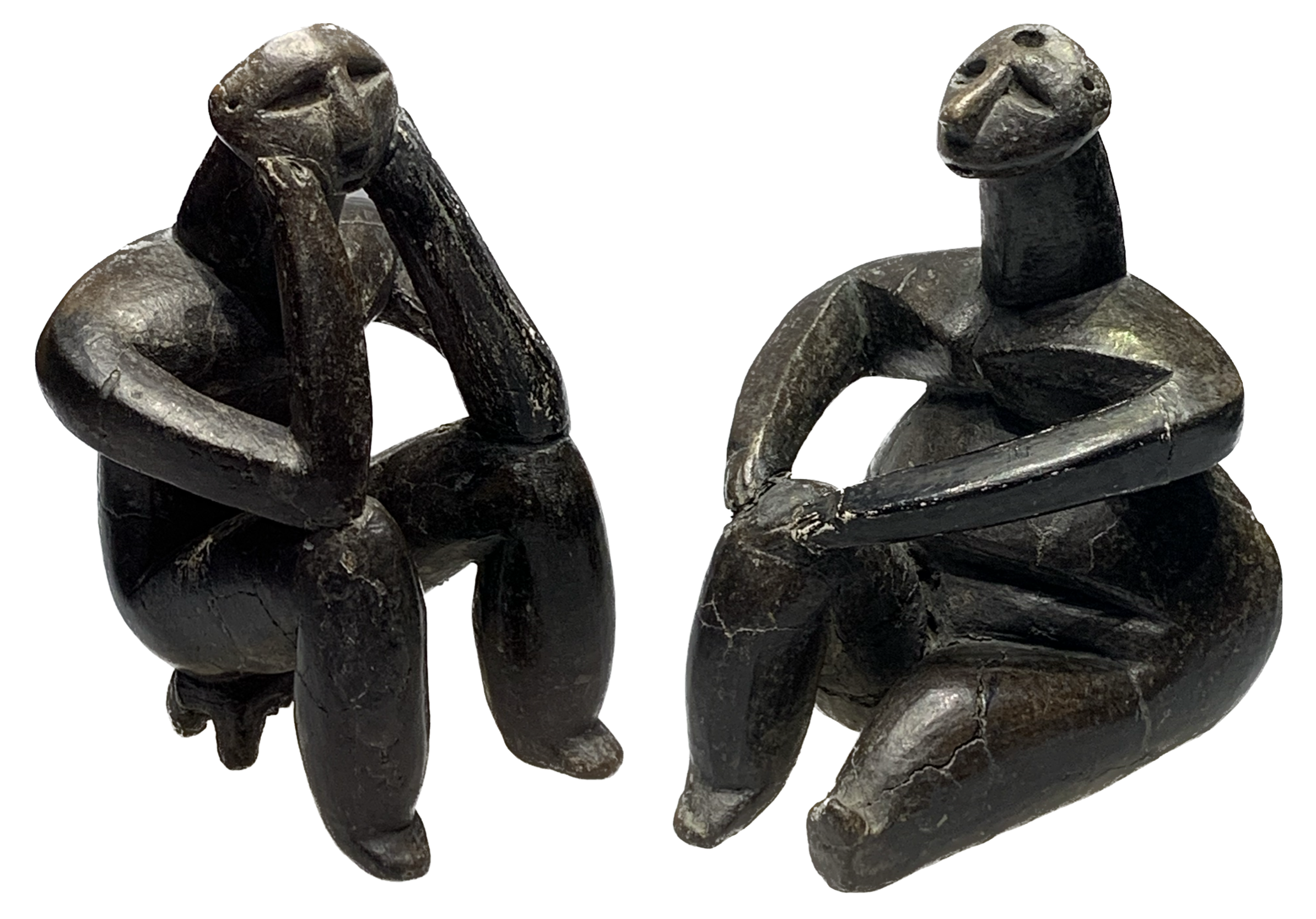
Thinker of Hamangia

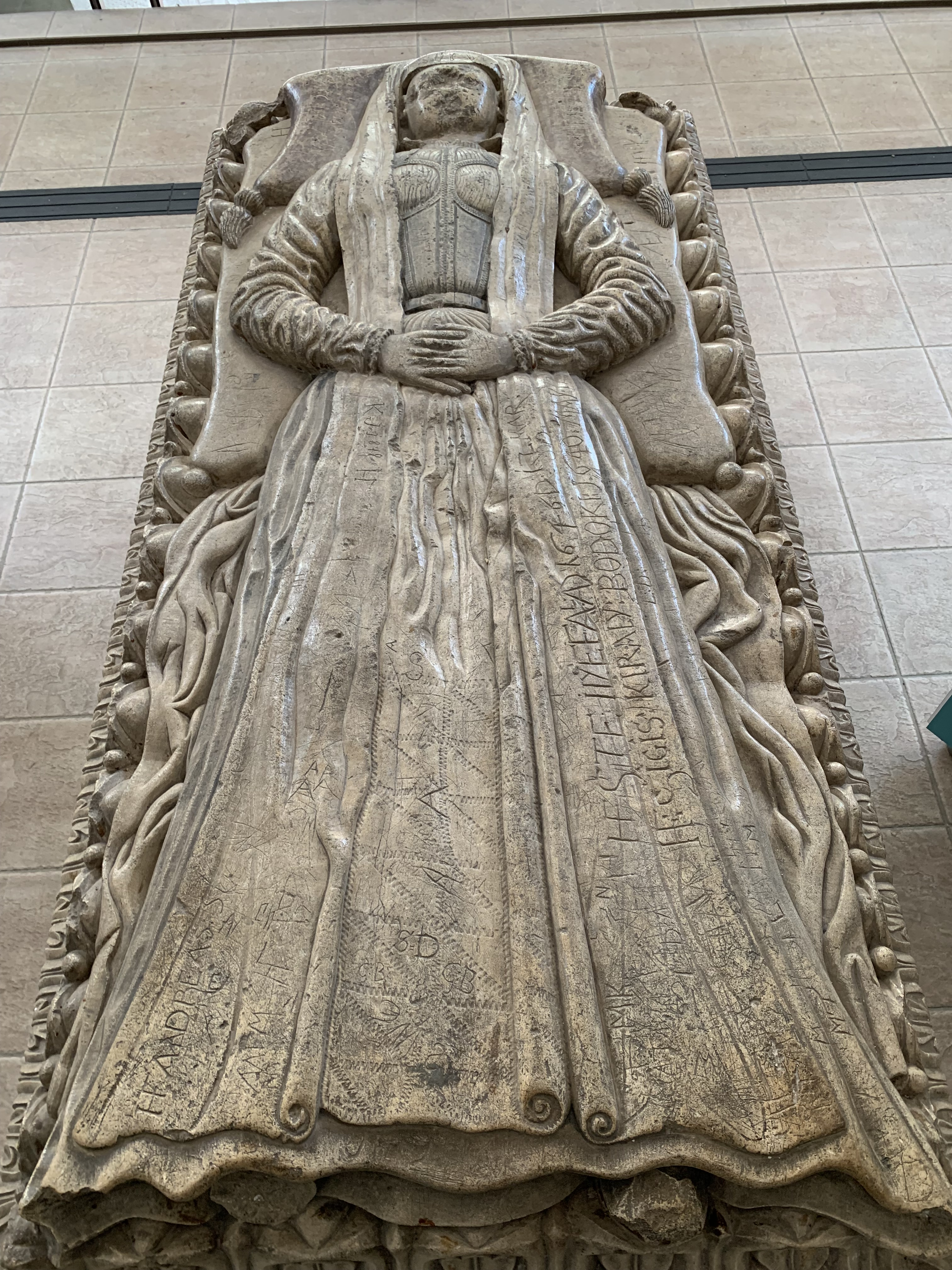
Sofia Potocky's Sarcophagus

== See also ==
- Romania lunar sample displays
- List of museums in Bucharest
