= Texas Commission on Fire Protection =

- Formation: October 1, 1991; 35 years ago
- Headquarters: Austin, Texas
- Location: 4800 N Lamar Blvd Suite 370, Austin, TX 78756
- Region served: Texas
- Website: http://www.tcfp.texas.gov/

The Texas Commission on Fire Protection (TCFP) is a Texas state governmental agency tasked with overseeing and regulating all paid fire departments, and firefighting standards within Texas.

The agency provides a variety of services including the writing and publication of curriculum manuals, standard manuals, job postings, and injury reports. Commission members are appointed by the Texas State Governor and subsequently confirmed by the Texas State Senate. Once commissioned; commission members each acquire the title of Commissioner, and hold office for a six-year term.
