= Lunar basalt 70017 =

Moon rock

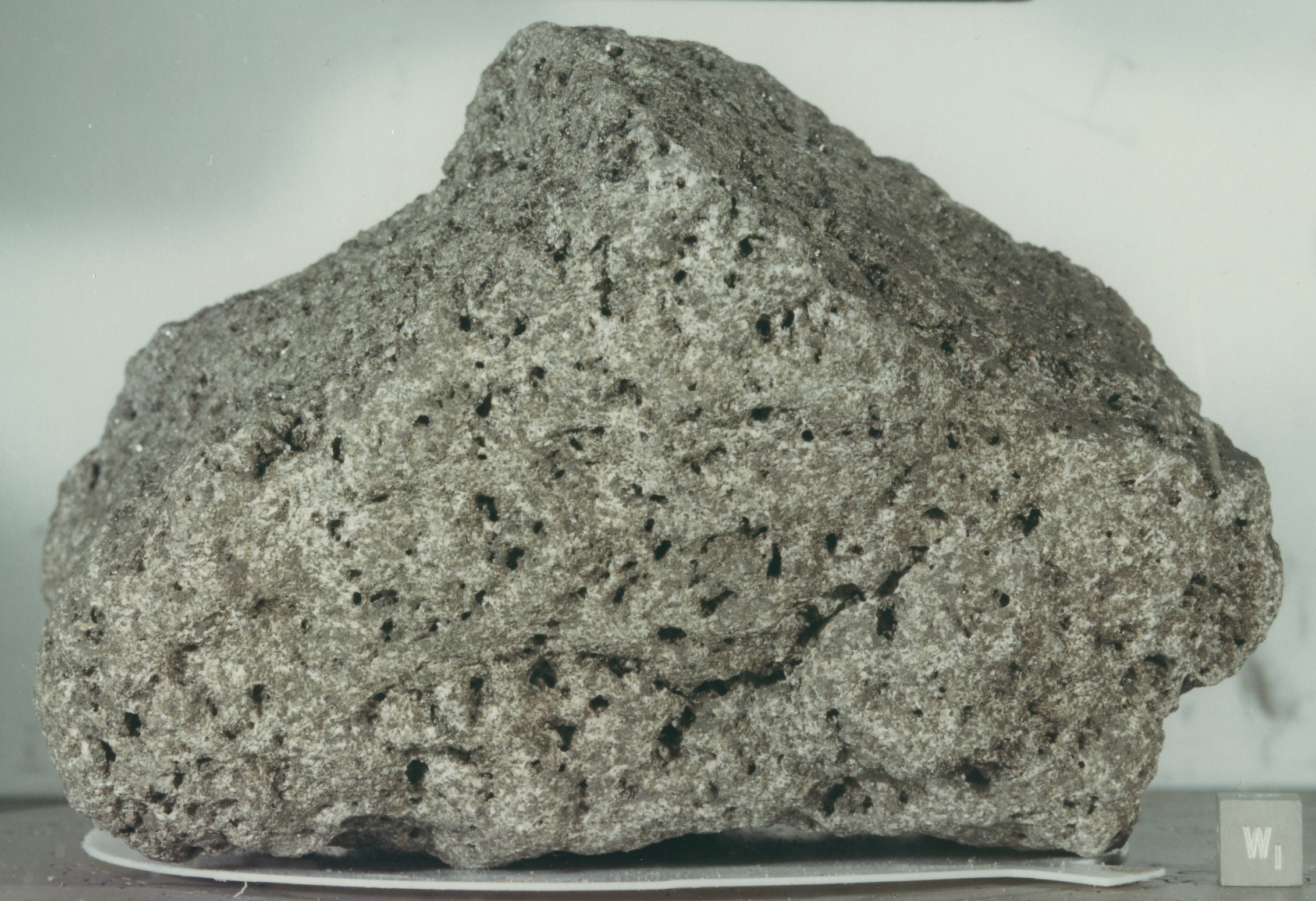
Lunar basalt 70017 returned by the Apollo 17 crew

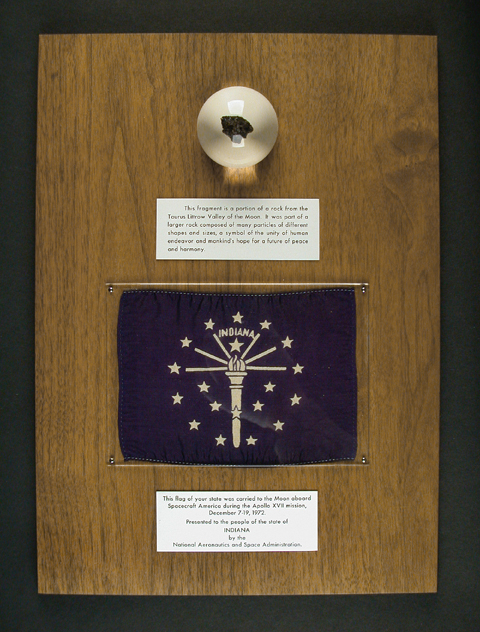
Apollo 17 display with a "Moon rock"

The Lunar basalt 70017 is a Moon rock gathered in 1972 by astronauts Eugene Cernan and Harrison Schmitt on the Apollo 17 mission near their Apollo Lunar Module and then divided into smaller pieces on Earth.

== History ==
Lunar basalt 70017 is a Moon basalt that was collected by astronauts Eugene Cernan and Harrison Schmitt on the last crewed Moon landing, Apollo 17, when they made a speech referring to "the children of the world". In 1973 President Nixon gave pieces of the lunar basalt 70017 to the 50 United States. Others were given as goodwill gifts by NASA. Some of the displays with the Moon rocks have been stolen, while others have been lost in inventory. NASA still has about 80 percent of the original rock.

== Description ==
The Apollo 17 "Lunar basalt 70017" total weight was 2957 grams. It was described by NASA as a "medium-grained high-Ti basalt" with a "crystallization age about 3.7" billion years "and an exposure age about 220" million years.

== See also ==
- List of Apollo lunar sample displays
- List of individual rocks
