= Galt Joint Union High School District =

School district in California, United States

Address
- 12945 Marengo Road Galt, California, 95632; United States

District information
- Type: Public
- Grades: 9–12
- NCES District ID: 0614820

Students and staff
- Students: 2,209
- Teachers: 99.78
- Staff: 121.23
- Student–teacher ratio: 22.14

Other information
- Website: www.ghsd.us

Galt Joint Union High School District (GJUHSD) is a high school district headquartered in Galt, California.

It serves sections of Sacramento and San Joaquin counties.

In Sacramento County it serves Galt, Clay, Herald, and a small section of Wilton. Areas it serves in San Joaquin county include Collierville, Thornton and a section of Dogtown.

Feeder school districts include Oak View Elementary School District, and the New Hope School District.

== Schools ==
Zoned:

- Galt High School
- Liberty Ranch High School

Others:

- Estrellita High School
- Galt Adult School
