= Liberty Ranch High School =

Coordinates: 38.286°N 121.281°W

- 12945 Marengo Rd; Galt, California; United States

Information
- Type: Public
- Established: 2009
- School district: Galt Joint Union High School District
- Principal: Joe Saramago
- Staff: 42.96 (FTE)
- Grades: 9 to 13
- Enrollment: 943 (2023–2024)
- Student to teacher ratio: 21.95
- Color: Green/Silver
- Athletics conference: Sierra Valley Conference
- Mascot: Hawk
- Website: Liberty Ranch High School

Liberty Ranch High School is a 9-12th grade high school in Galt, California and a part of the Galt Joint Union High School District. It was opened in 2009 to only freshmen and sophomores. The first graduating class was in 2012.

It serves a portion of Galt, as well as Clay, Herald and a small section of Wilton. It also serves residents of the New Hope School District.
