= Parkway–South Sacramento, California =

Unincorporated community in California, United States

Parkway–South Sacramento
- former census-designated place
- Location in Sacramento County and the state of California
- Coordinates: 38°30′42″N 121°27′8″W
- Country: United States
- State: California
- County: Sacramento

Area
  - Total: 4.8 sq mi (12.5 km^{2})
  - Land: 4.8 sq mi (12.5 km^{2})
  - Water: 0 sq mi (0 km^{2})

Population (2000)
  - Total: 36,468
  - Density: 7,560/sq mi (2,920/km^{2})
- Time zone: UTC-8 (PST)
  - Summer (DST): UTC-7 (PDT)
- ZIP code: 95824
- Area codes: 916, 279
- FIPS code: 06-55837

Parkway–South Sacramento is a former census-designated place (CDP) in Sacramento County, California, United States. It is part of the Sacramento–Arden-Arcade–Roseville Metropolitan Statistical Area. The area shares three boundaries with the City of Sacramento. The population was 36,468 at the 2000 census.

The CDP was abolished before the 2010 census. For that census, the area was divided into the CDPs of Fruitridge Pocket, Lemon Hill and Parkway.

== History ==
The urban sprawl of South Sacramento began with the routing of former U.S. Route 99 (now Stockton Boulevard) through the area. Stockton and Franklin boulevards extend southerly from Downtown Sacramento, and were used from the earliest days of the "gold mining" era for land routes to Stockton—as well as to travel to farming areas—long before the route was designated a U.S. highway.

The next transportation growth was the Southern Pacific Railroad and then several years after, the Western Pacific Railroad, both of which railroad tracks in neighboring Florin.

During the 1940s, steady growth of residential areas was occurring in neighboring areas of South Sacramento. During the 1950s additional shopping centers were developed on or near Stockton Boulevard and Florin Road, and new residential areas developed in the nearby Lindale and Florin areas. Rapid growth occurred in the early 1960s as the Florin Mall was built in South Sacramento as well as additions to the Lindale area, tapering off in the late '60s to early '70s.

== Geography ==
According to the United States Census Bureau, the CDP had a total area of 4.8 square miles (12.5 km^{2}), all land.

== Demographics ==
Historical population
Census	Pop.	Note	%±
1970	28,574		—
1980	26,815		−6.2%
1990	31,903		19.0%
2000	36,468		14.3%

As of the census of 2000, there were 36,468 people, 11,197 households, and 8,207 families residing in the CDP. The population density was 7,534.1 inhabitants per square mile (2,908.9/km^{2}). There were 11,779 housing units at an average density of 2,433.5 per square mile (939.6/km^{2}). The racial makeup of the CDP was 38.10% White, 16.64% African American, 1.54% Native American, 17.38% Asian, 0.64% Pacific Islander, 18.02% from other races, and 7.67% from two or more races. Hispanic or Latino of any race were 34.01% of the population.

There were 11,197 households, out of which 42.2% had children under the age of 18 living with them, 42.4% were married couples living together, 22.8% had a female householder with no husband present, and 26.7% were non-families. 20.8% of all households were made up of individuals, and 7.3% had someone living alone who was 65 years of age or older. The average household size was 3.22 and the average family size was 3.74.

In the CDP, the population was spread out, with 35.5% under the age of 18, 11.0% from 18 to 24, 27.9% from 25 to 44, 15.8% from 45 to 64, and 9.7% who were 65 years of age or older. The median age was 27 years. For every 100 females there were 95.5 males. For every 100 females age 18 and over, there were 92.5 males.

The median income for a household in the CDP was $31,194, and the median income for a family was $32,594. Males had a median income of $28,859 versus $25,107 for females. The per capita income for the CDP was $12,702. About 23.2% of families and 28.6% of the population were below the poverty line, including 40.3% of those under age 18 and 7.2% of those age 65 or over.

== Government ==
In the California State Senate, Parkway–South Sacramento is in the 6th senatorial district, represented by Republican Roger Niello. In the California State Assembly, it is split between the 7th Assembly district, represented by Republican Josh Hoover and the 9th Assembly district, represented by Republican Heath Flora.

In the United States House of Representatives, Parkway–South Sacramento is in California's 6th congressional district, represented by Democrat Ami Bera.
