= Rancho Seco Recreational Area =

Rancho Seco Lake
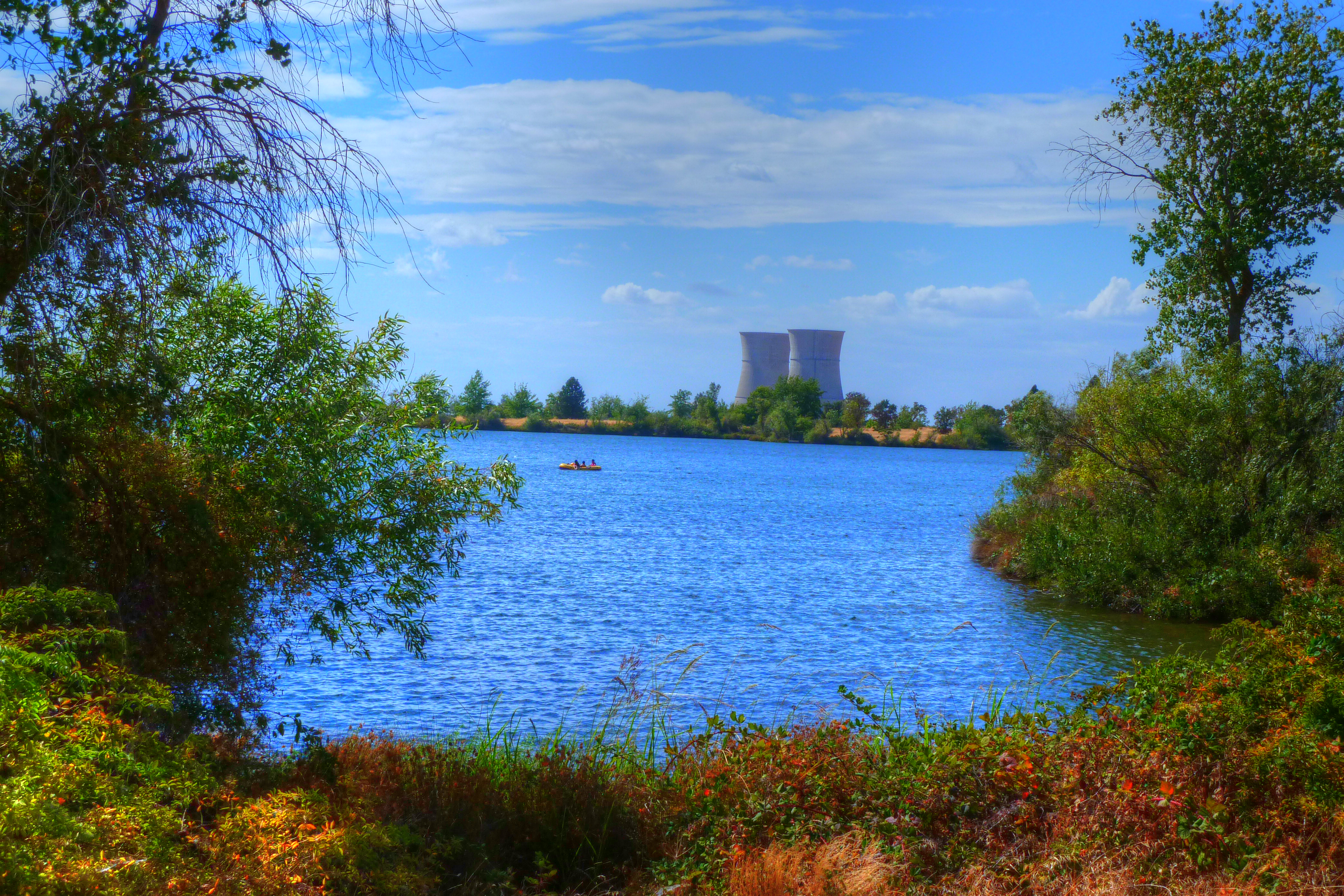
- Westward view across lake

- Location within California

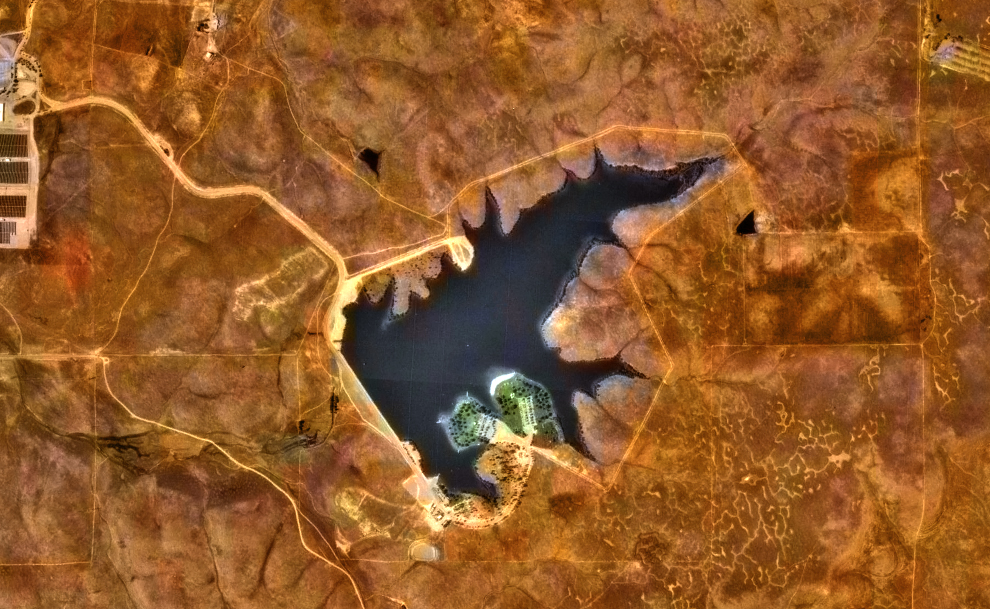
- Satellite map
- Location: Sacramento County, California
- Coordinates: 38.33802°N 121.09493°W
- Type: reservoir
- Primary inflows: Folsom South Canal
- Managing agency: SMUD
- Built: 1970s
- Surface area: 160 acres (0.25 sq mi; 0.65 km^{2})
- Surface elevation: 75 m (246 ft)
- References: SMUD

Rancho Seco Recreational Area is a recreational area located in the California Central Valley near the Rancho Seco Nuclear Generating Station in Herald, California. It is open to the public for camping, fishing, hiking and water activities. Boats are restricted to outboard electric motors which improves the lake's use as a swimming hole. The lake is fed by the Folsom South Canal.

== History ==
The area surrounding the park was operated by Sacramento County. In the early 1970s, the pond was expanded into a lake to act as backup emergency cooling water supply. In 1992, Sacramento Municipal Utility District (SMUD) took over responsibility for operating the park. In 1993, they began holding a trout fishing competition. The 7 miles (11 km) Howard Ranch Trail and a 75 acres (0.117 sq mi; 0.30 km^{2}) nature preserve were added to the park in 2006.

== Recreation ==
Herald, CA 10 miles from lake

Climate chart (precipitation, max. and min. temperature)
J	F	M	A	M	J	J	A	S	O	N	D
3.6 55 37	3.3 62 40	3 67 43	1.2 74 45	0.6 81 50	0.1 87 54	0.1 91 57	0.1 90 56	0.3 87 53	1.1 79 48	2.4 64 41	2.6 55 36
- █ Average max. and min. temperatures in °F
- █ Precipitation totals in inches
- Source: http://www.weather.com/outlook/health/fitness/wxclimatology/monthly/USCA0477
Metric conversion
J	F	M	A	M	J	J	A	S	O	N	D
90 13 3	84 17 4	76 19 6	29 23 7	15 27 10	3.3 31 12	1.5 33 14	2 32 13	8.6 31 12	27 26 9	60 18 5	66 13 2
- █ Average max. and min. temperatures in °C
- █ Precipitation totals in mm

Tent camping is available at 31 locations along the south shore of the lake. Each has a barbecue pit and picnic table. Drinking water and flush toilets are located near the sites. RV camping is available at 18 locations. In addition to the tent site amenities, they provide electricity. The park contains a dump station. A general store is open from May through September. Showers, laundry and a recreation room complete the lodging facilities.

Six docks with handicap access are located on the north and south shores of the lake. They can be used for shore fishing or launching a boat. Fishing from boats (electric outboard motors only) allows access to the interior and deeper portions of the lake. A natural population of largemouth bass, crappie, and bluegill are catchable. SMUD stocks the lake with trout and holds its annual trout competition once each year, in the spring. The matches are divided into two age divisions, above and below 16 years old. Each division gives out cash prizes. The adult division prizes go to the top 15 participants while the children's division prizes go to the top six participants. In the December 2005 adult division, Tom Kochis was awarded first place with a 4.22 pounds (1.91 kg) trout. Second through seventh place weighed in over 3 pounds (1.4 kg). The catches were made from both the shore and boats. The natural population of Florida strain bass feed on the planted trout which allows them to grow to record sizes. "Rancho Seco is a lake with the potential for producing a state or world record largemouth bass," said Dennis Lee, DFG senior fishery biologist. "The lake has the three characteristics needed to produce record class fish: (1) Florida-strain genes; (2) conditions that allow the fish to reach large size; and (3) a good food source, particularly planted rainbows." The lake bass record was caught April 10, 2003, with a length of 29 inches (74 cm), weighing 18.4 pounds (8.3 kg).

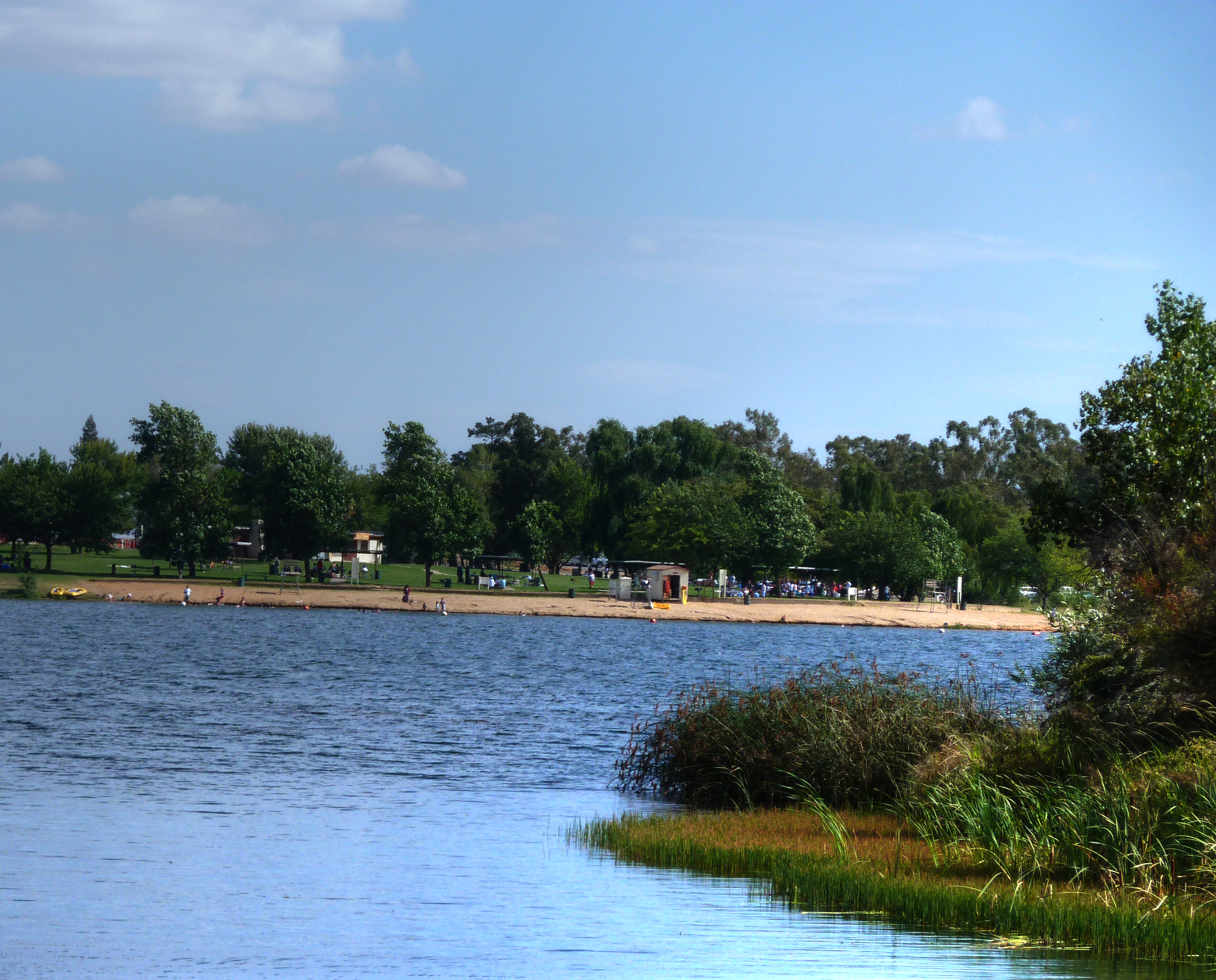
Swimming area

A 36,000 square feet (3,300 m^{2}) sandy beach is roped off for swimming with a posted lifeguard during the summer. The water is calm due to the gas motor restrictions on the lake. The motor restriction also makes it a popular spot for wind surfing, kayaking and canoeing. Kayaks and canoes are available for rental.

== Howard Ranch Trail ==
A 7 miles (11 km) trail starts on the north shore of the lake and winds east along the shore then heads out into open ranch land. The trail is gravel and crosses a few low wooden bridges. The main feature of the trail are seasonal vernal pools which support threatened and endangered species including tiger salamander and American spadefoot toad. The park offers guided tours of the trail and vernal pools.

== Amanda Blake Wildlife Refuge ==
The Amanda Blake wildlife refuge is located west of the lake across the dam. Covering 75 acres (0.117 sq mi; 0.30 km^{2}) of the park, it hosts captive-bred and rescued endangered animals including oryx and giant emu.

== Ecology ==
The park sits in the middle of an oak woodland with oak trees dominating the horizon when looking away from the lake. Below the oaks, a variety of grasses and flowering plants grow especially near the vernal pool locations. The lake shore has a thick barrier of blackberry bushes everywhere except the dam and the picnic/camping areas. Ducks and geese swim in the recreation areas where the shore is clear. Some people are observed feeding them. Great blue heron eat the fish from the lake. Bald eagles and hawks nest in the trees surrounding the lake. Many insects are present including dragonflies and grasshoppers. Raccoons are a notable mammal using the lake as a water source, with their droppings dispersed along the narrow animal trails cutting across the park.

== See also ==
- List of lakes in California
