= Rancho Seco Nuclear Generating Station =

Decommissioned power plant in California, US

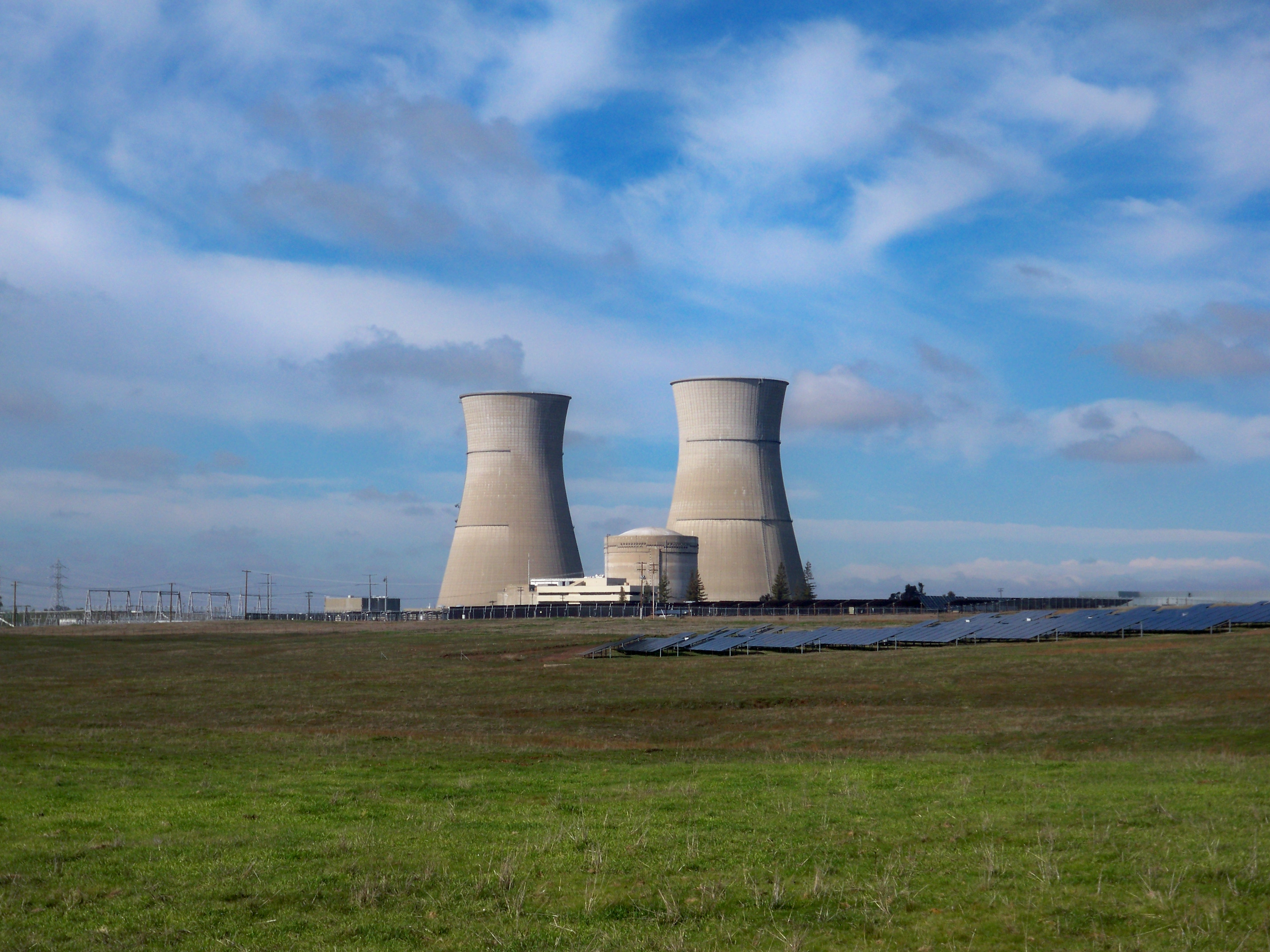
- Country: United States
- Location: Herald, California
- Coordinates: 38°20′43″N 121°7′18″W
- Status: Decommissioned
- Commission date: April 17, 1975
- Decommission date: June 23, 1989
- Construction cost: $375 million in 1974 dollars ($1.85 billion in 2024 dollars)
- Operator: SMUD 1974-present

Nuclear power station
- Reactor type: Pressurized water reactor
- Reactor supplier: Babcock & Wilcox
- Thermal capacity: 1 x 2772 MW_{th}

Power generation
- Nameplate capacity: 918
- Capacity factor: <40%

External links
- Commons: Related media on Commons

The Rancho Seco Nuclear Generating Station is a decommissioned nuclear power plant built by the Sacramento Municipal Utility District (SMUD) in Herald, California.

== History ==
In 1966, SMUD purchased 2,100 acres (850 ha) in southeast Sacramento County for a nuclear power plant, which was built in Herald, 25 miles (40 km) south-east of downtown Sacramento.

In the early 1970s, a small pond was expanded to a 160-acre (65 ha) lake to serve as an emergency backup water supply for the station. The lake has always received its water from the Folsom South Canal and has no relationship with the power plant's daily water supply. Surrounding the lake is 400 acres (160 ha) of recreational area originally operated by the County of Sacramento for day-use activities.

The 2,772 MWt Babcock & Wilcox pressurized water reactor (913 MWe) achieved initial criticality on September 16, 1974, and entered commercial operation on April 17, 1975.

On March 20, 1978, a power supply failure for the plant's non-nuclear instrumentation system led to steam generator dryout (ref NRC LER 312/78-001). This triggered an automatic reactor shutdown. In a 2005 document, the United States Nuclear Regulatory Commission indicated that it was the third most serious safety-related occurrence in the United States as of 2005 (behind the Three Mile Island accident and the Browns Ferry cable tray fire). The U.S. Nuclear Regulatory Commission (NRC) staff concluded that fundamental design flaws which were known by plant operators and the NRC itself were at the heart of the problem and should have been fixed years before. “In summary, the information was available and known which could have prevented this overcooling transient; but in the absence of adequate plant modifications, the incident should have been expected,” the staff wrote.

The plant operated from April 1975 to June 1989, with a lifetime capacity factor of less than 40%; it was closed by public vote in June 1989 (53% to 47%) after half of its intended lifetime primarily for economic reasons: ratepayers had seen their rates doubled in the last four years to pay for improvements to the plant, and electricity from natural gas was priced at half that of the electricity generated by Rancho Seco. (2.3 cents / kWh, vs. 5.4 cents / kWh)

All power-generating equipment has been removed from the plant, and the 425-foot high (130 m) cooling towers remain a prominent part of the local landscape as the tallest buildings in the Central Valley. Also scattered throughout the area around the plant are abandoned civil defense sirens that at one time would have warned people of a radioactivity release from the station. Additions to SMUD's Rancho Seco property include an 11 MW solar installation, a 160 MW solar installation (opened 2021), and the 600 MW natural gas-fired Cosumnes Power Plant (opened 2006).

On October 23, 2009, the Nuclear Regulatory Commission released the majority of the site for unrestricted public use, while approximately 11 acres (4.5 ha) of land including a storage building for low-level radioactive waste and a dry-cask spent fuel storage facility remain under NRC licenses.

According to a study published in the journal Biomedicine International, the statistically significant drop in cancer rates observed in Sacramento County between 1988 and 2009 (plant closed in 1989) might be partially attributable to the closure of the Rancho Seco plant, and the resultant decline in nuclear emissions. The result has been questioned by radiation expert and health physicist Robert Emery, who suggested it being the result of the sharpshooter fallacy and highlighted the author Joseph Mangano's history of exaggerated claims about radiological risks.

The plant cost $375 million when it was built in 1974 ($1.85 billion in 2024 dollars) and it cost about $120 million in 1974 dollars to decommission ($592 million in 2024 dollars), according to the SMUD Rancho Seco Nuclear Education Center.

== Gallery ==
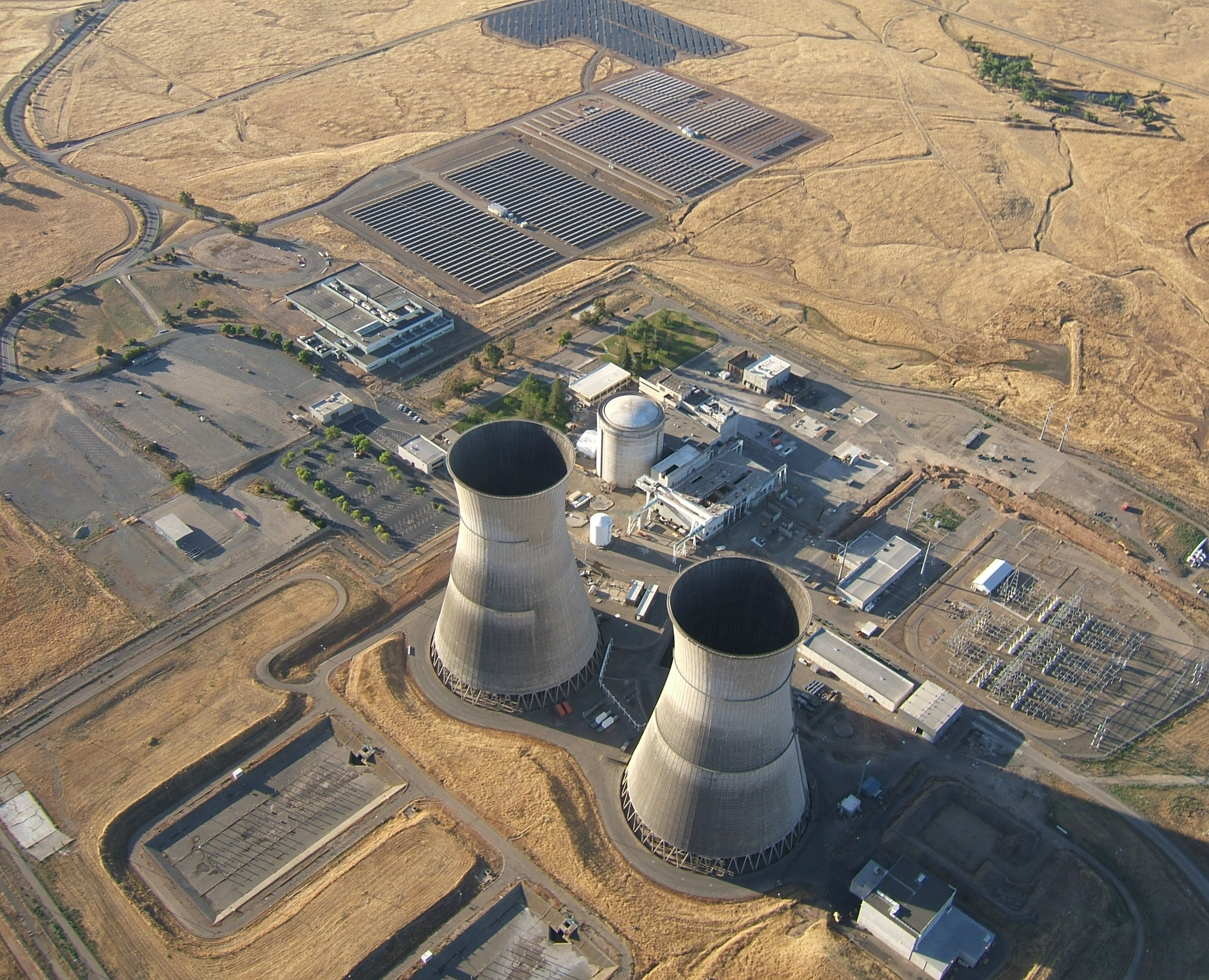
Rancho Seco nuclear power plant (2007)

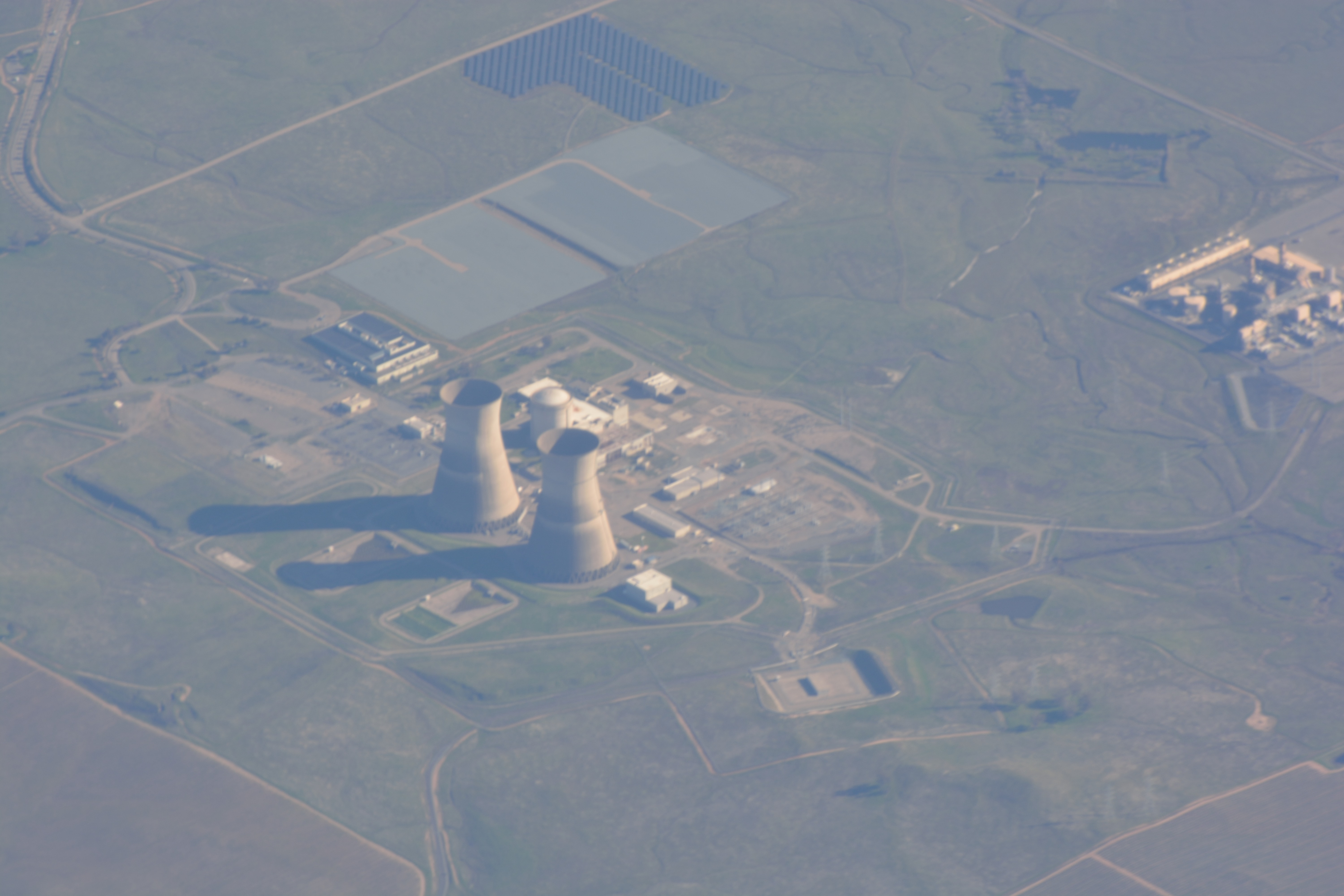
Rancho Seco from the air in 2015

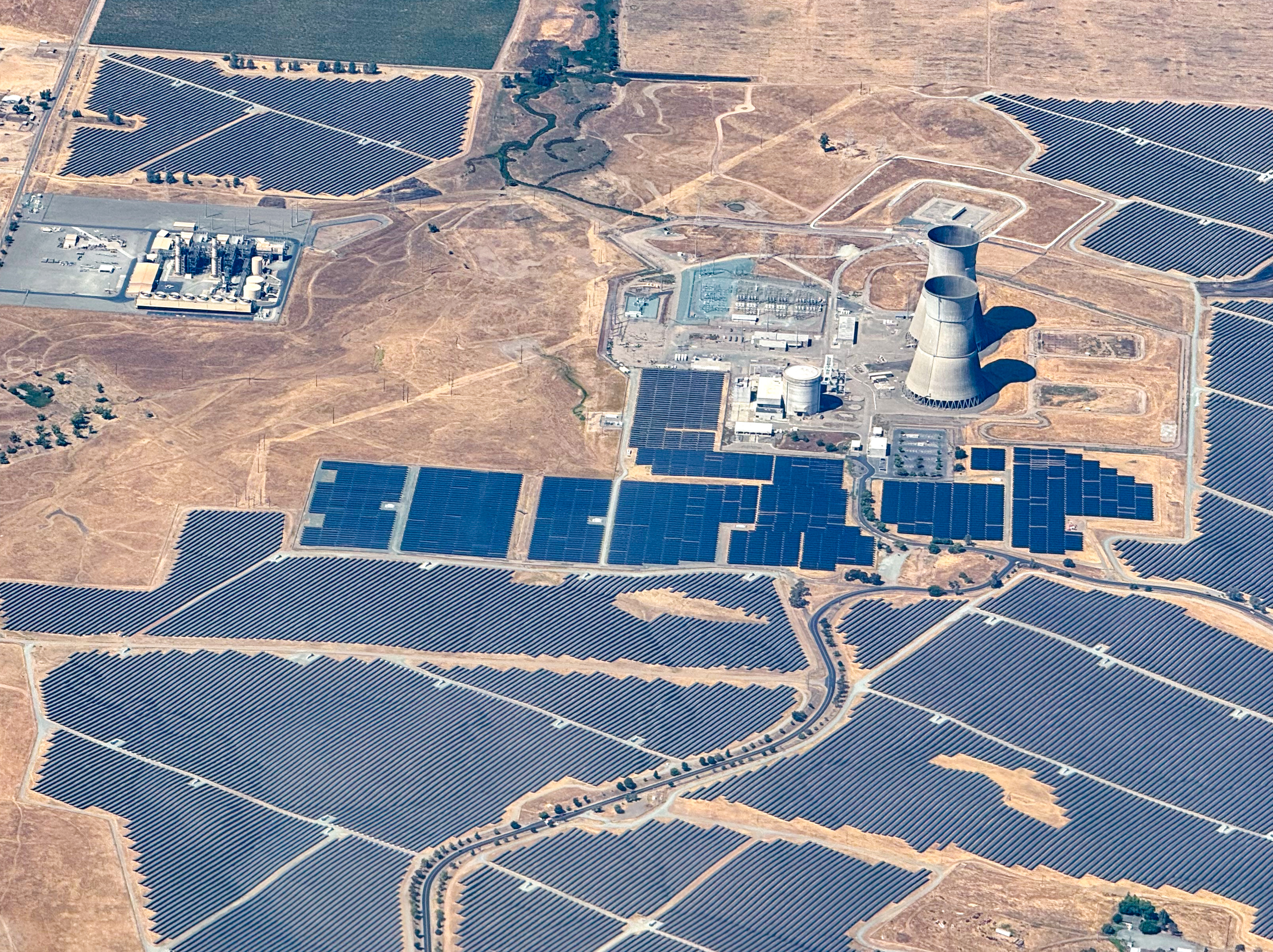
Rancho Seco nuclear power plant (2025)

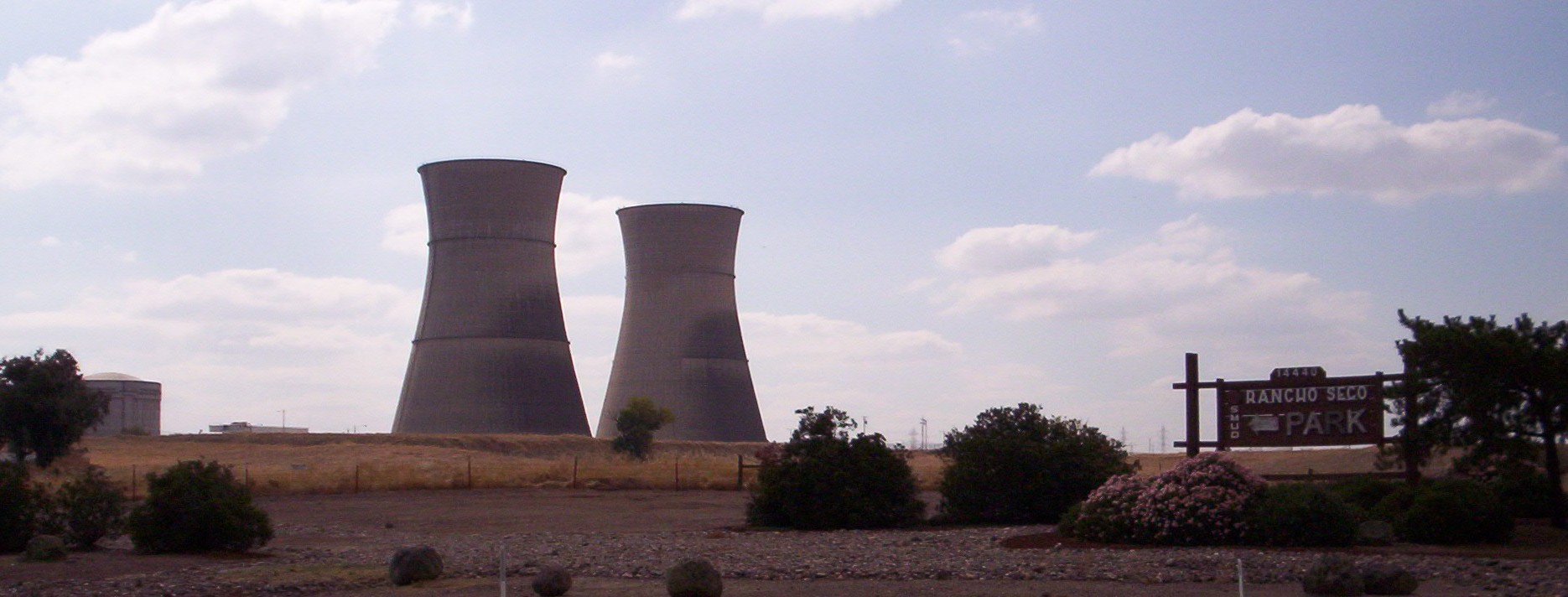
Rancho Seco towers

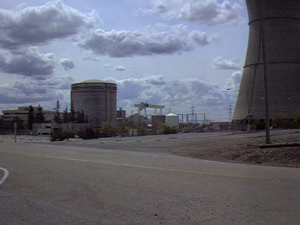
The containment building with a part of the cooling tower

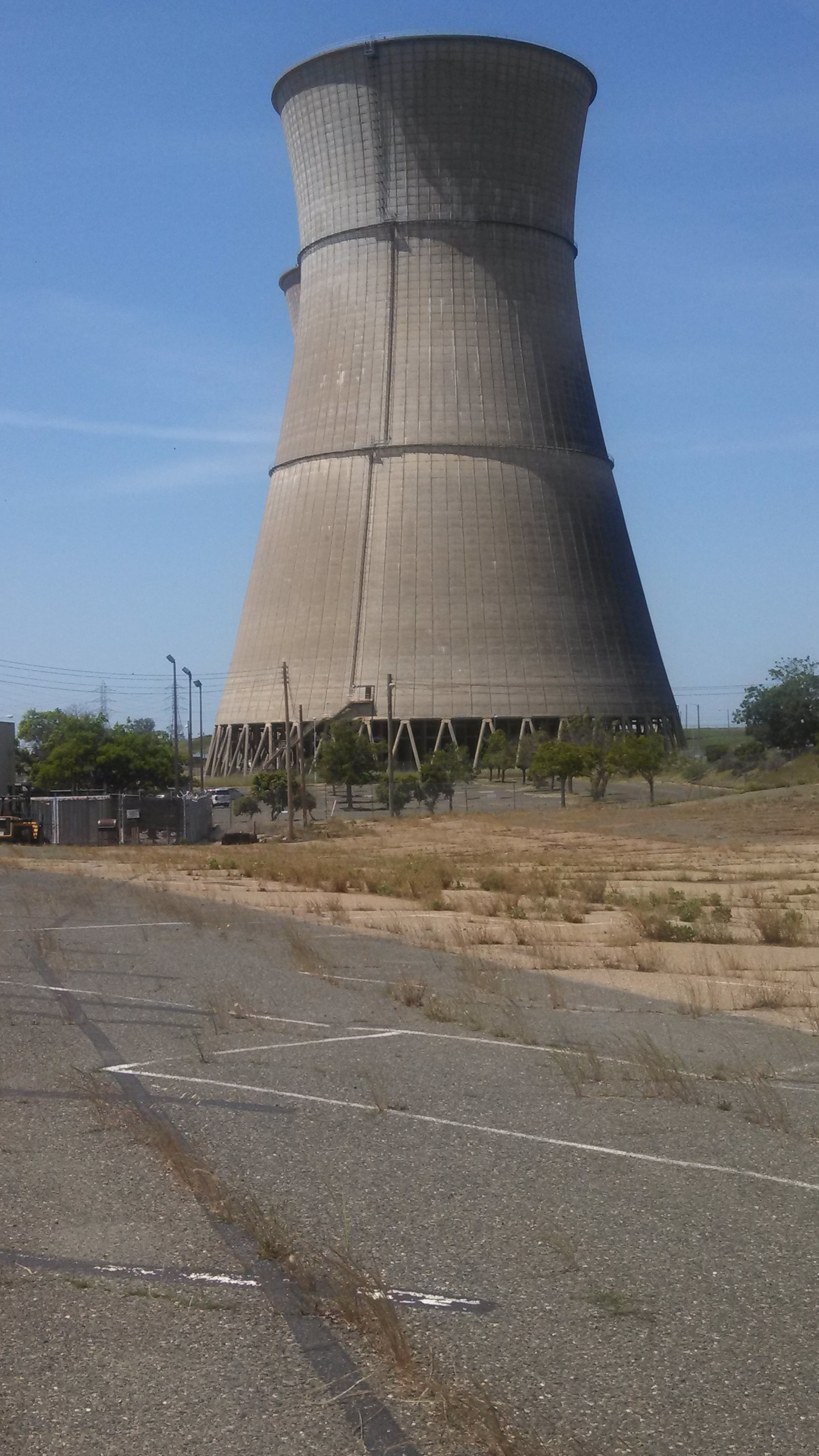
One of the two cooling towers, showing the base

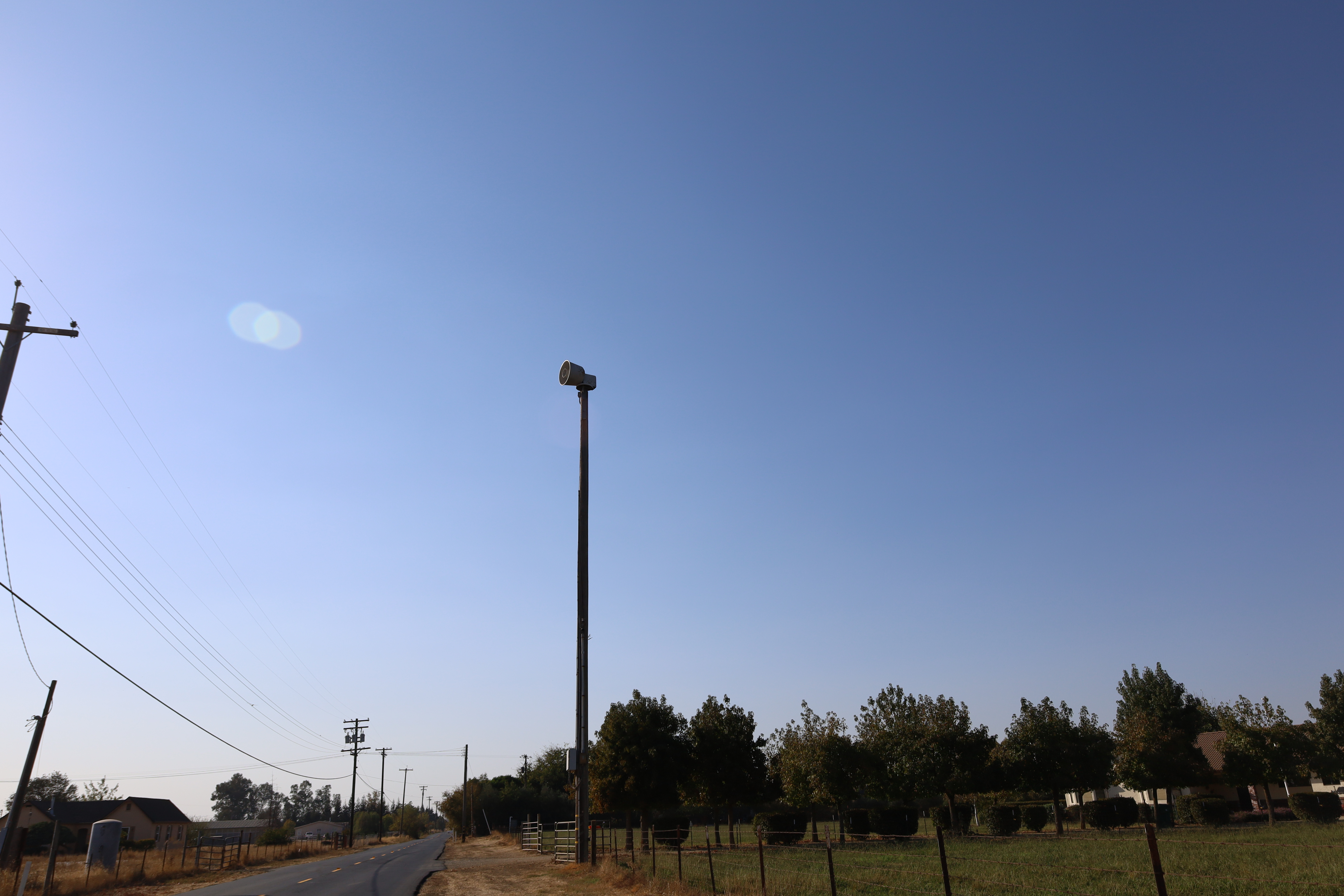
One of the many sirens Rancho Seco had

== See also ==
- Rancho Seco Recreational Park
- S. David Freeman, former SMUD leader, notable for his involvement in the decommissioning of the plant.
