= Parkway, California =

Parkway
- census-designated place
- Position in California.
- Coordinates: 38°29′58″N 121°27′07″W
- Country: United States
- State: California
- County: Sacramento

Area
  - Total: 2.409 sq mi (6.240 km^{2})
  - Land: 2.409 sq mi (6.240 km^{2})
  - Water: 0 sq mi (0 km^{2}) 0%
- Elevation: 20 ft (6.1 m)

Population (2020)
  - Total: 15,962
  - Density: 6,625/sq mi (2,558/km^{2})
- Time zone: UTC-8 (Pacific (PST))
  - Summer (DST): UTC-7 (PDT)
- ZIP code: 95823
- Area codes: 279 and 916
- GNIS feature ID: 2583107

Parkway is a Census-designated place in Sacramento County, California, United States. The 2020 United States census reported Parkway's population was 15,962.

Prior to the 2010 United States census, Parkway was grouped with Fruitridge Pocket and Lemon Hill in the Parkway-South Sacramento, California CDP.

== Geography ==
According to the United States Census Bureau, the CDP covers an area of 2.4 square miles (6.2 km^{2}), all land.

== Demographics ==
Historical population
Census	Pop.	Note	%±
2010	14,670		—
2020	15,962		8.8%
U.S. Decennial Census; 1850–1870 1880-1890; 1900 1910 1920; 1930 1940 1950; 1960 1970 1980; 1990 2000 2010

=== 2020 census ===
As of the 2020 census, Parkway had a population of 15,962 and a population density of 6,626.0 inhabitants per square mile (2,558.3/km^{2}). The median age was 32.1 years. The age distribution was 28.1% under the age of 18, 10.2% aged 18 to 24, 28.9% aged 25 to 44, 21.9% aged 45 to 64, and 10.9% who were 65 years of age or older. For every 100 females, there were 97.7 males, and for every 100 females age 18 and over, there were 94.3 males age 18 and over.

Racial composition as of the 2020 census
Race	Number	Percent
White	3,262	20.4%
Black or African American	2,703	16.9%
American Indian and Alaska Native	262	1.6%
Asian	3,005	18.8%
Native Hawaiian and Other Pacific Islander	258	1.6%
Some other race	4,596	28.8%
Two or more races	1,876	11.8%
Hispanic or Latino (of any race)	7,012	43.9%

The census reported that 97.1% of the population lived in households, 2.8% lived in non-institutionalized group quarters, and 0.1% were institutionalized. Parkway's population was 100.0% urban and 0.0% rural.

There were 4,750 households, out of which 44.5% included children under the age of 18, 39.3% were married-couple households, 8.8% were cohabiting couple households, 32.5% had a female householder with no spouse or partner present, and 19.4% had a male householder with no spouse or partner present. About 20.4% of households were one person, and 7.7% were one person aged 65 or older. The average household size was 3.26. There were 3,467 families (73.0% of all households).

There were 5,054 housing units at an average density of 2,098.0 units per square mile (810.0 units/km^{2}), of which 6.0% were vacant and 94.0% were occupied. Of occupied units, 45.5% were owner-occupied and 54.5% were occupied by renters. The homeowner vacancy rate was 0.7% and the rental vacancy rate was 7.4%.

=== 2010 census ===
Parkway first appeared as a census designated place in the 2010 U.S. census formed from part of the deleted Parkway-South Sacramento CDP and from area detached from Sacramento city.
