= Fruitridge Pocket, California =

Fruitridge Pocket
- census-designated place
- Location of Fruitridge Pocket in Sacramento County, California.

- Position in California.
- Coordinates: 38°31′58″N 121°27′21″W
- Country: United States
- State: California
- County: Sacramento

Area
  - Total: 0.592 sq mi (1.532 km^{2})
  - Land: 0.592 sq mi (1.532 km^{2})
  - Water: 0 sq mi (0 km^{2}) 0%
- Elevation: 33 ft (10 m)

Population (2020)
  - Total: 6,102
  - Density: 10,320/sq mi (3,983/km^{2})
- Time zone: UTC-8 (Pacific (PST))
  - Summer (DST): UTC-7 (PDT)
- ZIP code: 95820
- Area codes: 279 and 916
- GNIS feature ID: 2583020

Fruitridge Pocket is a census-designated place in Sacramento County, California, United States. Fruitridge Pocket sits at an elevation of 33 feet (10 m). The 2020 United States census reported Fruitridge Pocket's population as 6,102.

Prior to the 2010 United States census, Fruitridge Pocket was grouped with Parkway and Lemon Hill in the Parkway-South Sacramento, California CDP.

== Geography ==
According to the United States Census Bureau, the CDP covers an area of 0.6 square mile (1.5 km^{2}), all land.

== Demographics ==
Historical population
Census	Pop.	Note	%±
2010	5,800		—
2020	6,102		5.2%
U.S. Decennial Census; 1850–1870 1880-1890; 1900 1910 1920; 1930 1940 1950; 1960 1970 1980; 1990 2000 2010

Fruitridge Pocket first appeared as a census designated place in the 2010 U.S. census formed from part of deleted Parkway-South Sacramento CDP.

=== 2020 census ===
As of the 2020 census, Fruitridge Pocket had a population of 6,102 and a population density of 10,307.4 inhabitants per square mile (3,979.7/km^{2}). The median age was 32.9 years. The age distribution was 27.5% under the age of 18, 9.5% aged 18 to 24, 29.3% aged 25 to 44, 23.2% aged 45 to 64, and 10.5% who were 65 years of age or older. For every 100 females there were 101.7 males, and for every 100 females age 18 and over there were 102.6 males age 18 and over.

The census reported that 96.5% of the population lived in households, 3.5% lived in non-institutionalized group quarters, and no one was institutionalized. 100.0% of residents lived in urban areas, while 0.0% lived in rural areas.

There were 1,818 households in Fruitridge Pocket, of which 41.0% had children under the age of 18 living in them. Of all households, 34.4% were married-couple households, 10.7% were cohabiting couple households, 22.4% were households with a male householder and no spouse or partner present, and 32.5% were households with a female householder and no spouse or partner present. About 21.6% of all households were made up of individuals and 7.0% had someone living alone who was 65 years of age or older. The average household size was 3.24. There were 1,250 families (68.8% of all households).

There were 1,942 housing units at an average density of 3,280.4 units per square mile (1,266.6 units/km^{2}), of which 1,818 (93.6%) were occupied and 6.4% were vacant. Of occupied units, 42.9% were owner-occupied and 57.1% were occupied by renters. The homeowner vacancy rate was 2.7% and the rental vacancy rate was 2.8%.

Racial composition as of the 2020 census
Race	Number	Percent
White	1,292	21.2%
Black or African American	923	15.1%
American Indian and Alaska Native	163	2.7%
Asian	1,010	16.6%
Native Hawaiian and Other Pacific Islander	79	1.3%
Some other race	1,762	28.9%
Two or more races	873	14.3%
Hispanic or Latino (of any race)	2,831	46.4%

=== Demographic estimates ===
In 2023, the US Census Bureau estimated that 22.3% of the population were foreign-born. Of all people aged 5 or older, 59.0% spoke only English at home, 25.2% spoke Spanish, 3.0% spoke other Indo-European languages, 12.6% spoke Asian or Pacific Islander languages, and 0.2% spoke other languages. Of those aged 25 or older, 76.5% were high school graduates and 15.9% had a bachelor's degree.

=== Income and poverty ===
The median household income was $51,350, and the per capita income was $20,275. About 22.6% of families and 33.6% of the population were below the poverty line.
