= Galt High School =

Location
- 145 North Lincoln Way; Galt, California; United States; 38°15′23″N 121°17′57″W

Information
- Type: Public
- Established: 1911
- School district: Galt Joint Union High School District
- Principal: Kellie Beck
- Teaching staff: 44.24 (FTE)
- Grades: 9 to 13
- Enrollment: 963 (2023–2024)
- Student to teacher ratio: 21.77
- Mascot: Warrior
- Website: Galt High School

Galt High School is one of three high schools in Galt, California. It is part of the Galt Joint Union High School District and is accredited by Western Association of Schools and Colleges.

In addition to serving portions of Galt, it also serves all students in San Joaquin County except for those in the New Hope School District.

== History ==
Galt High School was established on October 19, 1911 as a result of Dr. Montegue combining efforts with J.W. Reese to form a high school district in Galt, California. The city of Galt had an election to decide whether Galt High should be built. The vote tally was 141 yes and 40 no. In 1911 after the opening of the school, there were six teachers, three females and three males. The first subjects taught were English, Latin, Math, composition and music. The first graduate of Galt High was Katherine Reynolds.

The first official high school was built in 1913. The second Galt High School was burned down in 1924. The third Galt High was completed in 1927. This school was built prior to earthquake safety laws and was ordered to be demolished in 1948. The school the students attend now is the fourth Galt High School. In the 2011–2012 school year, to celebrate Galt High School's 100 years of history, Galt alumni searched for fellow graduates to join the celebration. Galt High School had a week-long celebration which included an alumni football game, rallies, contests for boys and girls, and floats made by current and past high school students.

The class of 2012 changed the name of the Galt High library to V. Nunez-M. Yenokida library. It was named after Vesta Nunez and Michiye Yenokida, who served twelve and twenty-seven years, respectively, as Galt High's librarians.

Their school colors are red and white with black trim, and their school mascot is the Warrior.

In 1925, Galt High School in California established the first recorded public school flight-training. The flight and aviation education offered there quite likely represents the first application of aerospace education to the magnet school concept in the United States

Galt High School also has an agricultural department, which is connected with the organization Future Farmers of America. Vocational Agriculture started in 1922 and Galt joined FFA in 1929, but it was not organized until 1938. The Agriculture department, coined the AG-department, with classes including Agricultrtal Environmental Science, Integrated AG Biology, AG Physiology/Anatomy, AG Economics and Government. The electives are Mechanics, Floral Design, Construction, and Leadership. There have been twelve past state California State FFA officers from Galt. The first was the 1974-1975 Treasurer Dennis Johnson. The most recent were Maico Ortiz, State Sentinel and Mia Arisman, State Secretary, both of whom were elected to serve from 2020 to 2021. Dane White, an AG teacher at Galt High, was the State Sentinel in 1999-2000 and he was the National President from 2001–2002. Over the years, Galt has won many awards, including the 2010-2011 National Champions Marketing Plan Team.

According to the 2011-2012 Student Handbook, general graduation requirements for graduation include passing the California High School Exit Exam; Acquiring 220 credits; successfully completing all prescribed courses; and earning no fewer than 50 semester credits per year in each of the first three academic years of high school in order to be considered progressing.

In 1936, Galt High school chose Willy the Warrior as the mascot to replace the milkers. Later the mascot was changed to the chiefs but now the current mascot is the warrior.

In February 1997, Galt High's criminal justice class was subjected to a search via drug-sniffing dogs. A student, Chris Sulamo, refused the search and was escorted to the principal's office where his personal belongings were searched. The search turned up no evidence of illegal drug paraphernalia. A student's jacket created a false alarm with the dogs, but the student wanted a police officer present before the search continued. Nothing illegal was found on either of the students in the classroom. Due to this random search the ACLU was contacted and a lawsuit was filed, claiming an invasion of privacy, which is unconstitutional. Galt High Board of Trustees agreed to drop the drug-sniffing dog program if the lawsuit was also dropped. Part of the agreement was also to remove the suspension of Sulamo.

== Athletics ==
Alumni Zach Phillips and Ryan Mattheus, both of whom made Major League Baseball debuts in 2011, have had their jersey numbers retired by their alma mater.

Galt High Warrior's Section Championships include nine titles Currently, GHS is in the Division IV, Sierra Valley Conference (SVC) in the CIF Sac-Joaquin Section competing against Bradshaw Christian, El Dorado, Liberty Ranch, Rosemont and Union Mine.

== Clubs ==
Galt FFA Champion Teams and Individuals National Championship - Agricultural Issues team 2017 National Championship - Agricultural Issues team 2016 National Reserve Championship - Agriscience Fair 2009
