= Oak View Union Elementary School District =

School district in California, United States

Address
- 7474 East Collier Road Acampo, California, 95220; United States

District information
- Type: Public
- Grades: K–8
- Established: 1861; 165 years ago
- NCES District ID: 0627930

Students and staff
- Students: 363 (2020–2021)
- Teachers: 16.0 (FTE)
- Staff: 25.11 (FTE)
- Student–teacher ratio: 22.69:1

Other information
- Website: www.myoakview.com

Oak View Elementary School District or the Oak View Union School District is a school district headquartered in unincorporated San Joaquin County, California, near Acampo. It operates a single school. High school students in its area attend the Galt Joint Union High School District.

On May 8, 1861, the Telegraph School District was created; the district served what was Elliott Township. On June 10, 1929, it adopted its current name and annexed the Eliott School District, and it annexed the Huston School District on July 5, 1932.

== Schools ==
Oak View built a four-room school with a bond passed on July 10, 1929, worth $20,000; the school received additions in 1946, 1961, and three wings in the period in the period 1990–2003. The first had two additional classrooms, a room for teachers, and an office, later converted into another classroom. The second included six classrooms in two wings, with a cafeteria and a new office, worth a total of $110,000. The 1990-2003 wings had three classrooms each. Circa 2012 the district needed a new parking lot, so it razed the 1946 addition.

In 2012 a building with a teacher's lounge, stage, kitchen, and combined cafeteria and gymnasium opened, funded by a 2008 $2,900,000 bond.

The district's first-ever school, the Telegraph School, was a one-room school house in Dry Creek. In the 1890s the student body increased. A new school building opened, funded by a $2,000 bond passed on April 13, 1907. The school district stated "probably after" the Oak View school received its 1961 addition, "The old Telegraph School disappeared".
