= Lemon Hill, California =

Lemon Hill
- census-designated place
- Location of Lemon Hill in Sacramento County, California.

- Position in California.
- Coordinates: 38°31′02″N 121°27′26″W
- Country: United States
- State: California
- County: Sacramento

Area
  - Total: 1.640 sq mi (4.248 km^{2})
  - Land: 1.640 sq mi (4.248 km^{2})
  - Water: 0 sq mi (0 km^{2}) 0%
- Elevation: 30 ft (9.1 m)

Population (2020)
  - Total: 14,496
  - Density: 8,838/sq mi (3,412/km^{2})
- Time zone: UTC-8 (Pacific (PST))
  - Summer (DST): UTC-7 (PDT)
- GNIS feature ID: 2583055

Lemon Hill is a census-designated place in an unincorporated area of Sacramento County, California, United States, south of the city of Sacramento. Lemon Hill sits at an elevation of 30 feet (9.1 m). The 2020 United States census reported Lemon Hill's population as 14,496.

Prior to the 2010 United States census, Lemon Hill was grouped with Parkway and Fruitridge Pocket in the Parkway-South Sacramento, California CDP.

== Geography ==
According to the United States Census Bureau, the CDP covers an area of 1.6 square miles (4.2 km^{2}), all land.

== Demographics ==
Historical population
Census	Pop.	Note	%±
2010	13,729		—
2020	14,496		5.6%
U.S. Decennial Census; 1850–1870 1880-1890; 1900 1910 1920; 1930 1940 1950; 1960 1970 1980; 1990 2000 2010

=== 2020 census ===
As of the 2020 census, Lemon Hill had a population of 14,496. The population density was 8,839.0 inhabitants per square mile (3,412.8/km^{2}). The age distribution was 31.1% under the age of 18, 9.6% aged 18 to 24, 28.2% aged 25 to 44, 21.7% aged 45 to 64, and 9.4% aged 65 or older. The median age was 31.2 years. For every 100 females, there were 95.9 males, and for every 100 females age 18 and over, there were 94.7 males age 18 and over.

The census reported that 99.6% of the population lived in households, 0.4% lived in non-institutionalized group quarters, and no one was institutionalized. There were 4,302 households, of which 45.0% had children under the age of 18, 37.7% were married-couple households, 10.6% were cohabiting couple households, 30.9% had a female householder with no spouse or partner present, and 20.8% had a male householder with no spouse or partner present. About 18.7% of households were made up of individuals, and 6.8% had someone living alone who was 65 years of age or older. The average household size was 3.36, and there were 3,123 families (72.6% of all households).

There were 4,502 housing units at an average density of 2,745.1 units per square mile (1,059.9 units/km^{2}). Of all housing units, 4.4% were vacant and 95.6% were occupied. Of occupied units, 40.1% were owner-occupied and 59.9% were occupied by renters. The homeowner vacancy rate was 1.0%, and the rental vacancy rate was 3.4%.

100.0% of residents lived in urban areas, while 0.0% lived in rural areas.

Racial composition as of the 2020 census
Race	Number	Percent
White	2,919	20.1%
Black or African American	1,506	10.4%
American Indian and Alaska Native	348	2.4%
Asian	2,953	20.4%
Native Hawaiian and Other Pacific Islander	631	4.4%
Some other race	4,437	30.6%
Two or more races	1,702	11.7%
Hispanic or Latino (of any race)	6,728	46.4%

=== 2010 census ===
Lemon Hill first appeared as a census designated place in the 2010 U.S. census formed from part of deleted Parkway-South Sacramento CDP.

=== Demographic estimates ===
In 2023, the US Census Bureau estimated that 29.8% of the population were foreign-born. Of all people aged 5 or older, 45.8% spoke only English at home, 30.9% spoke Spanish, 4.3% spoke other Indo-European languages, 18.7% spoke Asian or Pacific Islander languages, and 0.3% spoke other languages. Of those aged 25 or older, 69.2% were high school graduates and 8.9% had a bachelor's degree.

=== Income and poverty ===
The median household income in 2023 was $49,441, and the per capita income was $21,760. About 22.3% of families and 28.3% of the population were below the poverty line.
