= Clay, California =

Clay
- census-designated place
- Location of Clay in Sacramento County, California.

- Position in California.
- Coordinates: 38°18′51″N 121°09′35″W
- Country: United States
- State: California
- County: Sacramento

Area
  - Total: 6.76 sq mi (17.50 km^{2})
  - Land: 6.76 sq mi (17.50 km^{2})
  - Water: 0 sq mi (0.00 km^{2}) 0%
- Elevation: 135 ft (41 m)

Population (2020)
  - Total: 1,252
  - Density: 185.3/sq mi (71.56/km^{2})
- Time zone: UTC-8 (Pacific (PST))
  - Summer (DST): UTC-7 (PDT)
- GNIS feature ID: 2582975

Clay is a census-designated place in Sacramento County, California, United States. Clay sits at an elevation of 135 feet (41 m). The 2020 United States census reported Clay's population as 1,252.

== Geography ==
According to the United States Census Bureau, the CDP covers an area of 6.8 square miles (17.5 km^{2}), all land.

== Demographics ==
Historical population
Census	Pop.	Note	%±
2010	1,195		—
2020	1,252		4.8%
U.S. Decennial Census; 1850–1870 1880-1890; 1900 1910 1920; 1930 1940 1950; 1960 1970 1980; 1990 2000 2010

=== 2020 census ===
As of the 2020 census, Clay had a population of 1,252 and a population density of 185.3 inhabitants per square mile (71.5/km^{2}). The median age was 46.4 years. The age distribution was 245 people (19.6%) under the age of 18, 100 people (8.0%) aged 18 to 24, 252 people (20.1%) aged 25 to 44, 388 people (31.0%) aged 45 to 64, and 267 people (21.3%) who were 65 years of age or older. For every 100 females, there were 100.0 males, and for every 100 females age 18 and over, there were 103.8 males age 18 and over.

0.0% of residents lived in urban areas, while 100.0% lived in rural areas.

Racial composition as of the 2020 census
Race	Number	Percent
White	874	69.8%
Black or African American	19	1.5%
American Indian and Alaska Native	23	1.8%
Asian	47	3.8%
Native Hawaiian and Other Pacific Islander	1	0.1%
Some other race	130	10.4%
Two or more races	158	12.6%
Hispanic or Latino (of any race)	284	22.7%

The whole population lived in households. There were 421 households, out of which 107 (25.4%) had children under the age of 18 living in them, 282 (67.0%) were married-couple households, 17 (4.0%) were cohabiting couple households, 74 (17.6%) had a female householder with no spouse or partner present, and 48 (11.4%) had a male householder with no spouse or partner present. 62 households (14.7%) were one person, and 44 (10.5%) were one person aged 65 or older. The average household size was 2.97. There were 333 families (79.1% of all households).

There were 447 housing units at an average density of 66.2 units per square mile (25.6 units/km^{2}), of which 421 (94.2%) were occupied. Of these, 388 (92.2%) were owner-occupied, and 33 (7.8%) were occupied by renters. 5.8% of housing units were vacant; the homeowner vacancy rate was 2.3% and the rental vacancy rate was 5.6%.

=== 2010 census ===
Clay first appeared as a census designated place in the 2010 U.S. census.
