= Herald, California =

Herald
- census-designated place
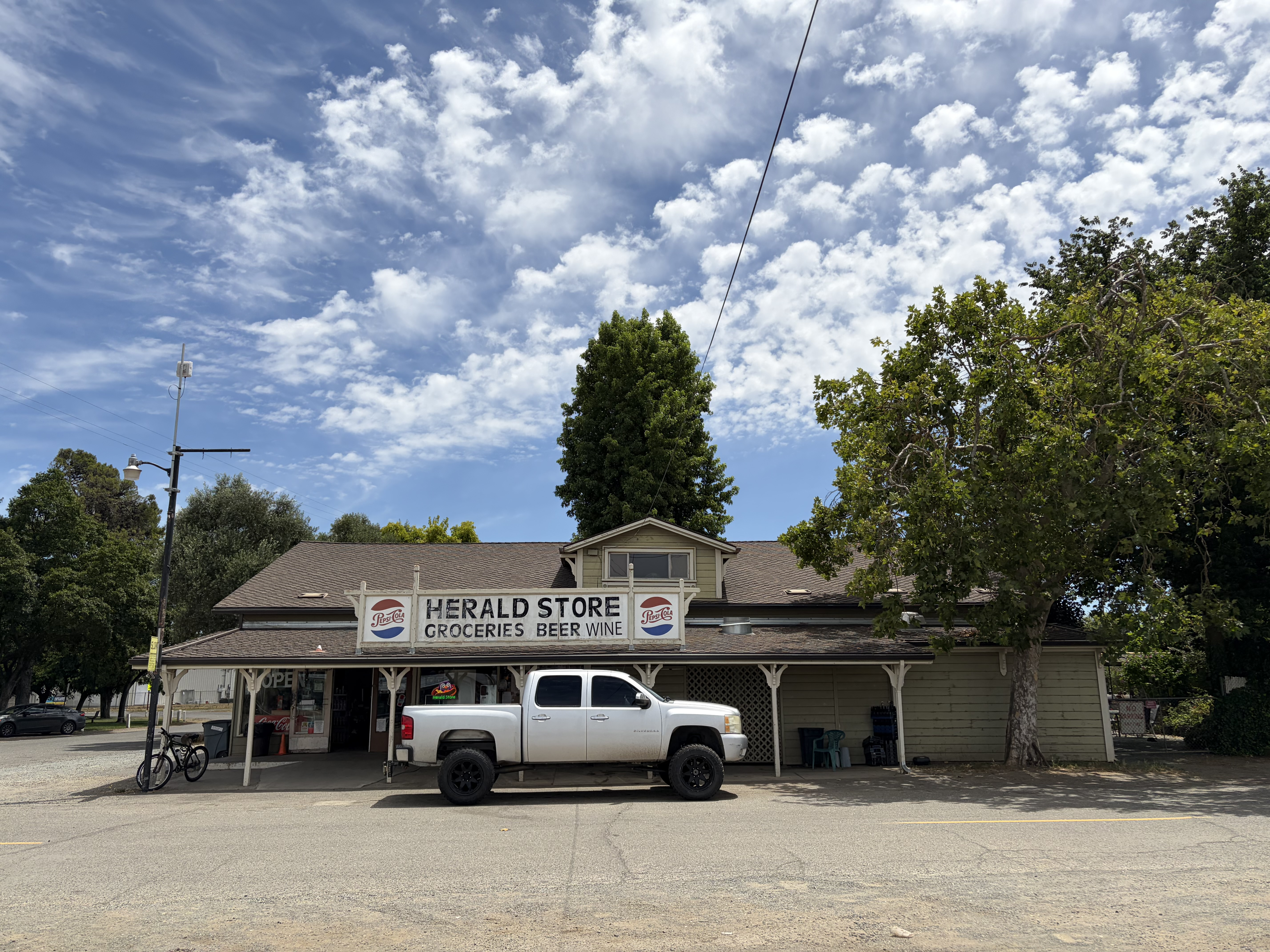

- Location of Herald in Sacramento County, California

- Position in California
- Coordinates: 38°17′18″N 121°13′52″W
- Country: United States
- State: California
- County: Sacramento

Area
  - Total: 7.901 sq mi (20.464 km^{2})
  - Land: 7.879 sq mi (20.406 km^{2})
  - Water: 0.022 sq mi (0.058 km^{2}) 0.28%
- Elevation: 79 ft (24 m)

Population (2020)
  - Total: 1,160
  - Density: 147/sq mi (56.8/km^{2})
- Time zone: UTC-8 (Pacific (PST))
  - Summer (DST): UTC-7 (PDT)
- ZIP Code: 95638
- Area code: 209
- GNIS feature ID: 2583034

Herald is a census-designated place in Sacramento County, California, United States. Herald sits at an elevation of 79 feet (24 m). It is located east of the city of Galt along State Route 104. The ZIP Code is 95638, and the community is served by area code 209. The 2020 United States census reported that Herald's population was 1,160.

The now-decommissioned 918MW Rancho Seco Nuclear Generating Station was built in Herald; its site is now the location of the 1000MW gas-fired Cosumnes Power Plant and an 11 MW solar installation. The nuclear plant's disused cooling towers remain standing, and are the largest buildings in California's Central Valley. Nearby Rancho Seco Recreational Park features a lake originally created to serve as an emergency backup water supply for the plant.

== History ==
Herald was developed in 1910 as a land speculation project of the Central California Traction Company alongside the expansion of the electric interurban railway from Stockton into Sacramento. The site was roughly half way between the two cities and at the line’s junction with the Southern Pacific’s Amador Branch. The developers understood that residents of the Herald "colony" would be dependent on supplies shipped via their new line. To encourage the sale of lots, the Traction Company built a demonstration farm at the proposed townsite and ran special excursion trains there for prospective buyers.

The name “Herald” is a portmanteau of the first names of the railroad’s partial owner, Herbert Fleishhacker, and its President, Alden Anderson. Neighboring “Walmort” received a similar name, combining the names of the railroad’s former Secretary, Walter Anderson, and its partial owner, Mortimer Fleishhacker.

== Geography ==
According to the United States Census Bureau, the CDP covers an area of 7.9 square miles (20.5 km^{2}), of which 99.72% is land and 0.28% is water.

== Demographics ==
Historical population
Census	Pop.	Note	%±
2010	1,184		—
2020	1,160		−2.0%
U.S. Decennial Census; 1850–1870 1880-1890; 1900 1910 1920; 1930 1940 1950; 1960 1970 1980; 1990 2000 2010

Herald first appeared as a census designated place in the 2010 U.S. census.

=== 2020 census ===
As of the 2020 census, Herald had a population of 1,160 and a population density of 147.2 inhabitants per square mile (56.8/km^{2}). The median age was 45.7 years. 20.5% of residents were under the age of 18 and 15.7% of residents were 65 years of age or older. For every 100 females, there were 103.9 males, and for every 100 females age 18 and over, there were 106.7 males.

The census reported that 1,121 people (96.6% of the population) lived in households and 39 (3.4%) were institutionalized. There were 359 households, out of which 129 (35.9%) had children under the age of 18 living in them. Of all households, 210 (58.5%) were married-couple households, 13 (3.6%) were cohabiting couple households, 74 (20.6%) had a female householder with no spouse or partner present, and 62 (17.3%) had a male householder with no spouse or partner present. 67 households (18.7%) were one person, and 34 (9.5%) were one person aged 65 or older. The average household size was 3.12. There were 272 families (75.8% of all households).

The age distribution was 238 people (20.5%) under the age of 18, 122 people (10.5%) aged 18 to 24, 208 people (17.9%) aged 25 to 44, 410 people (35.3%) aged 45 to 64, and 182 people (15.7%) who were 65 years of age or older.

There were 378 housing units at an average density of 48.0 units per square mile (18.5 units/km^{2}), of which 359 (95.0%) were occupied. The homeowner vacancy rate was 0.3% and the rental vacancy rate was 4.3%. Of the occupied units, 296 (82.5%) were owner-occupied and 63 (17.5%) were occupied by renters.

0.0% of residents lived in urban areas, while 100.0% lived in rural areas.

Racial composition as of the 2020 census
Race	Number	Percent
White	720	62.1%
Black or African American	23	2.0%
American Indian and Alaska Native	14	1.2%
Asian	45	3.9%
Native Hawaiian and Other Pacific Islander	3	0.3%
Some other race	161	13.9%
Two or more races	194	16.7%
Hispanic or Latino (of any race)	322	27.8%

=== 2010 census ===
The 2010 United States census reported that Herald had a population of 1,184. The population density was 149.9 inhabitants per square mile (57.9/km^{2}). The racial makeup of Herald was 934 (78.9%) White, 20 (1.7%) African American, 13 (1.1%) Native American, 64 (5.4%) Asian, 7 (0.6%) Pacific Islander, 105 (8.9%) from other races, and 41 (3.5%) from two or more races. Hispanic or Latino of any race were 254 persons (21.5%).

The Census reported that 1,105 people (93.3% of the population) lived in households, 79 (6.7%) lived in non-institutionalized group quarters, and 0 (0%) were institutionalized.

There were 350 households, out of which 142 (40.6%) had children under the age of 18 living in them, 260 (74.3%) were opposite-sex married couples living together, 27 (7.7%) had a female householder with no husband present, 20 (5.7%) had a male householder with no wife present. There were 14 (4.0%) unmarried opposite-sex partnerships, and 2 (0.6%) same-sex married couples or partnerships. 37 households (10.6%) were made up of individuals, and 15 (4.3%) had someone living alone who was 65 years of age or older. The average household size was 3.16. There were 307 families (87.7% of all households); the average family size was 3.29.

The population was spread out, with 269 people (22.7%) under the age of 18, 102 people (8.6%) aged 18 to 24, 243 people (20.5%) aged 25 to 44, 411 people (34.7%) aged 45 to 64, and 159 people (13.4%) who were 65 years of age or older. The median age was 43.4 years. For every 100 females, there were 114.9 males. For every 100 females age 18 and over, there were 115.3 males.

There were 376 housing units at an average density of 47.6 per square mile (18.4/km^{2}), of which 295 (84.3%) were owner-occupied, and 55 (15.7%) were occupied by renters. The homeowner vacancy rate was 2.3%; the rental vacancy rate was 3.5%. 930 people (78.5% of the population) lived in owner-occupied housing units and 175 people (14.8%) lived in rental housing units.

== Government ==
In the California State Legislature, Herald is in the 6th senatorial district, represented by Republican Roger Niello, and in the 9th Assembly district, represented by Republican Heath Flora.

In the United States House of Representatives, Herald is in California's 7th congressional district, represented by Democrat Doris Matsui.
