= Sacramento County, California =

County in California, United States

Sacramento County
- County
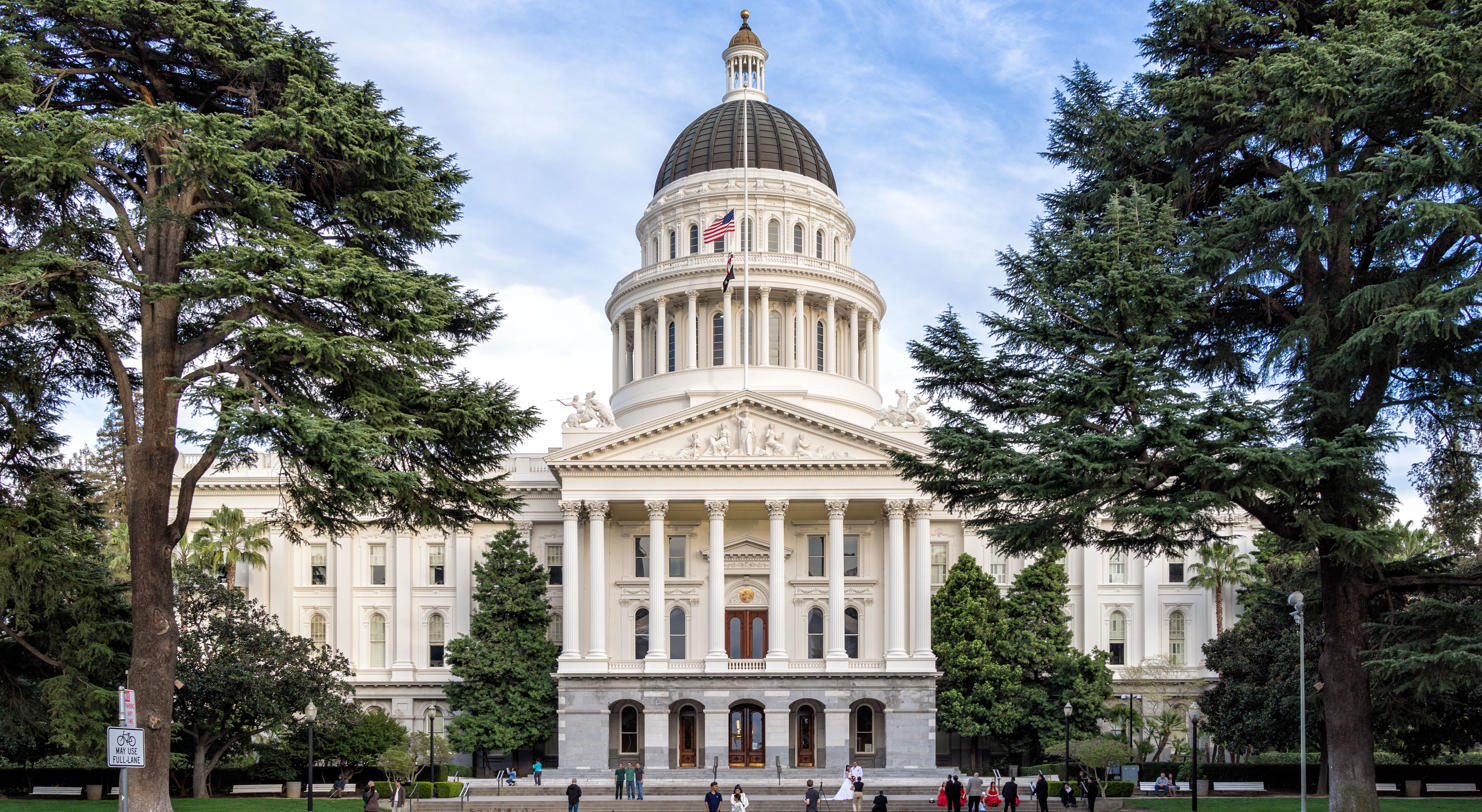
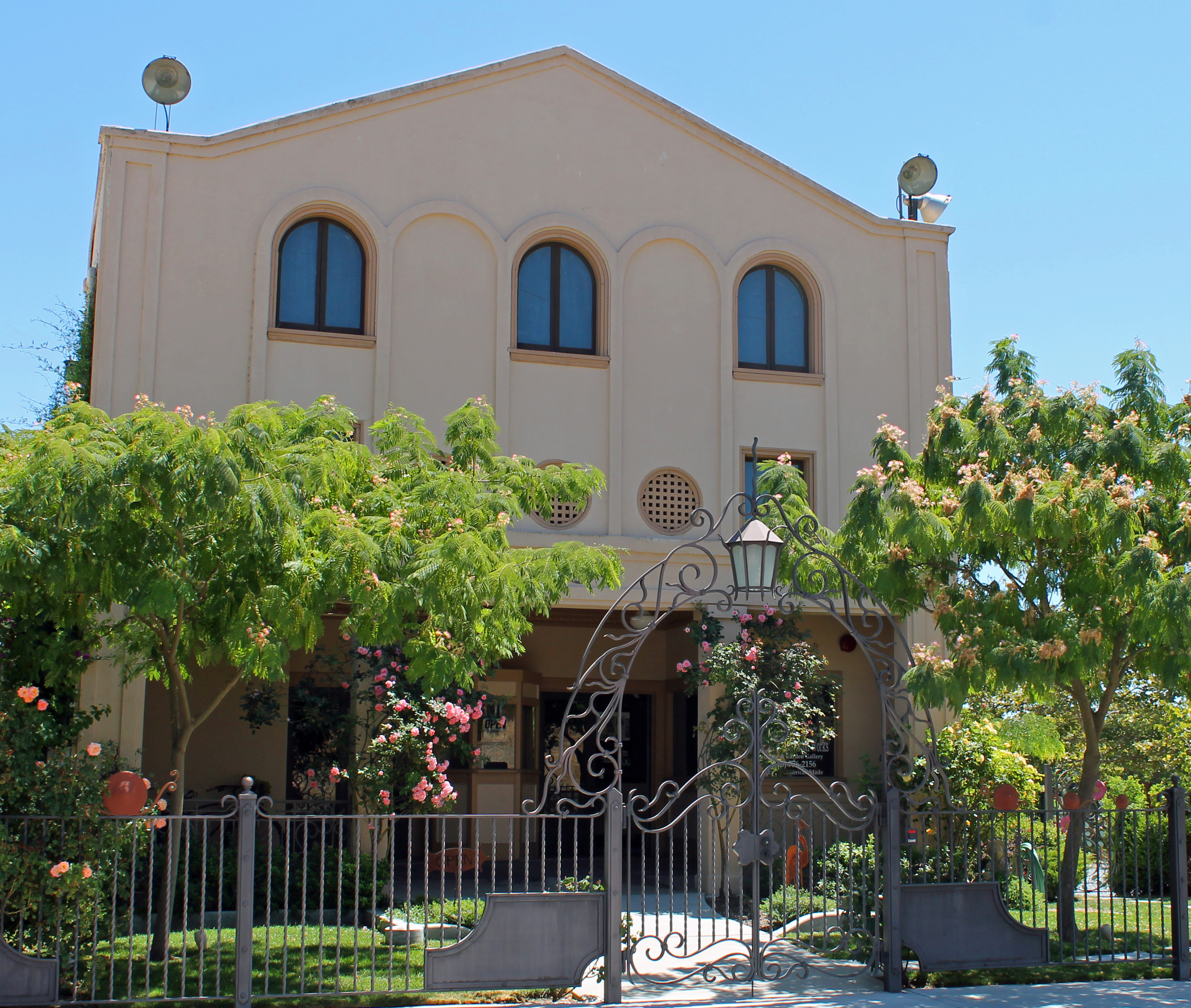
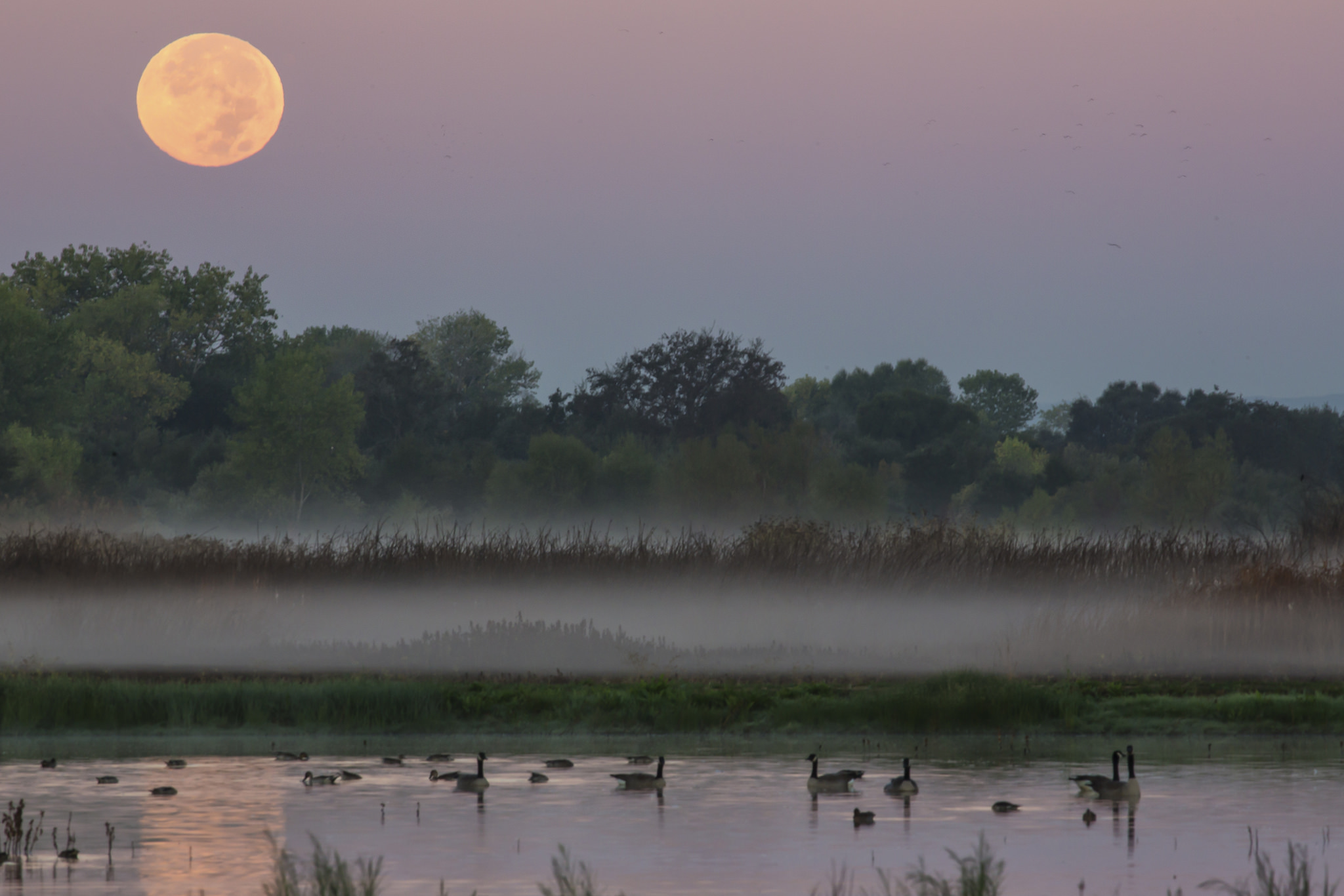
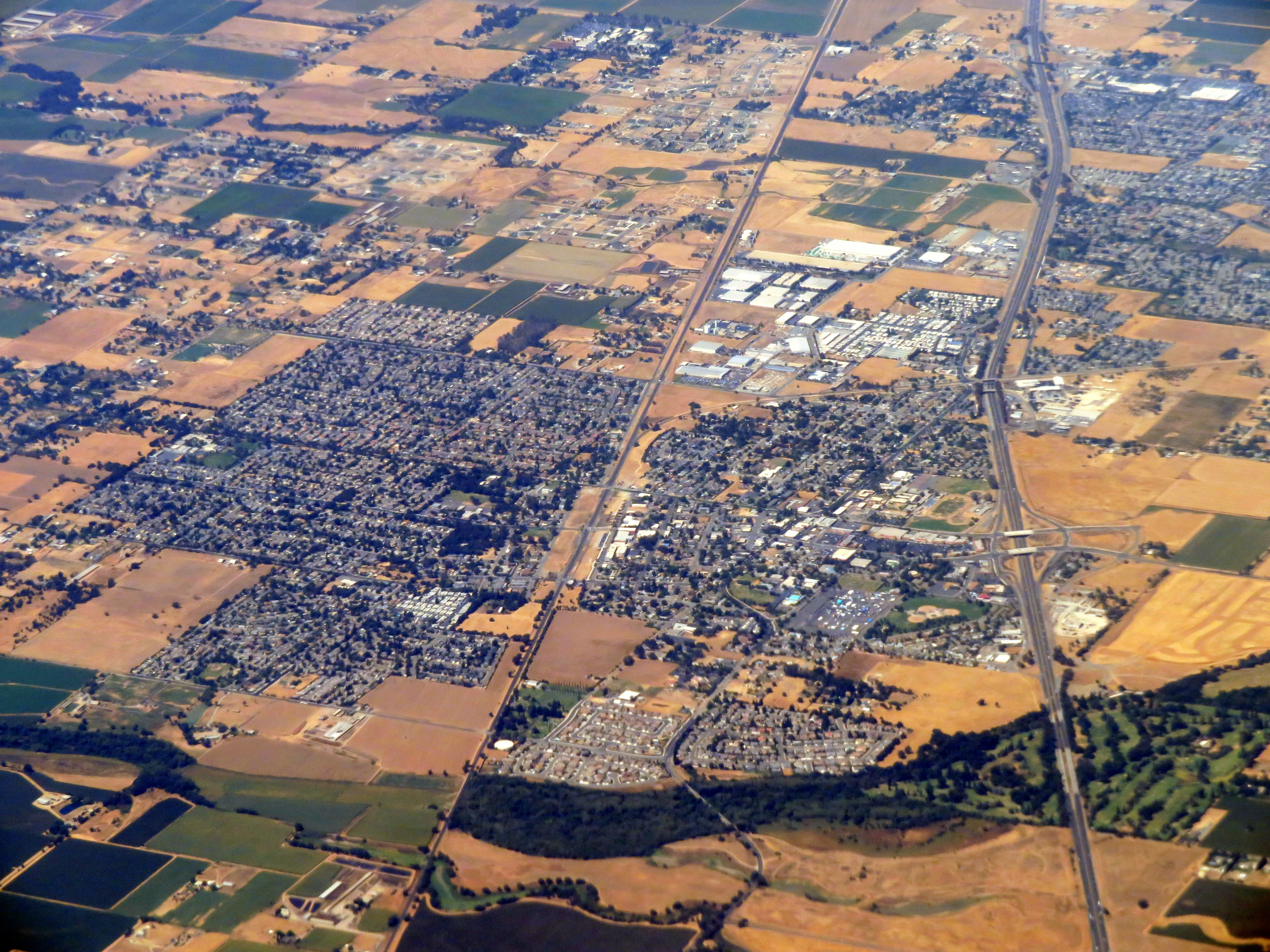
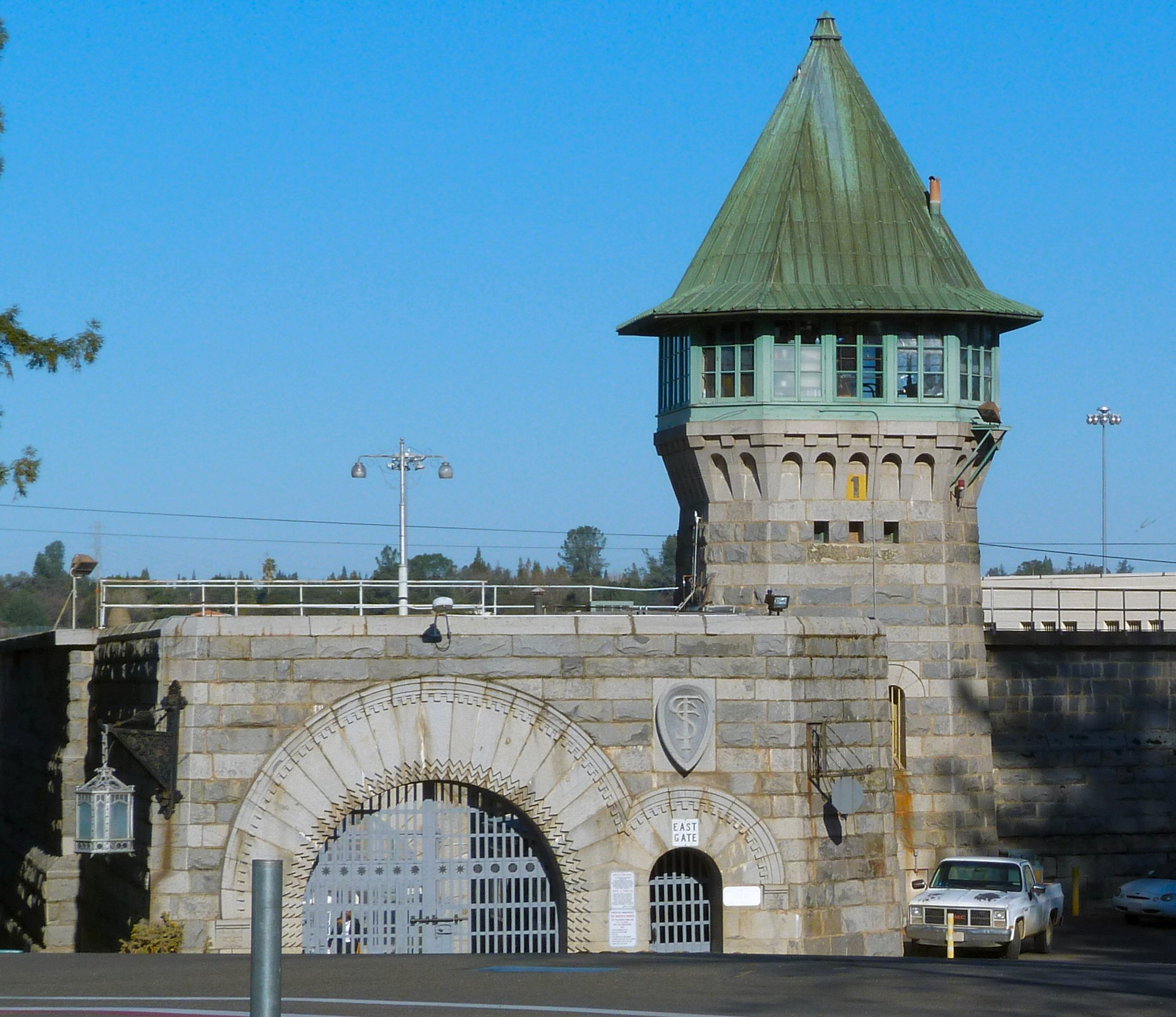
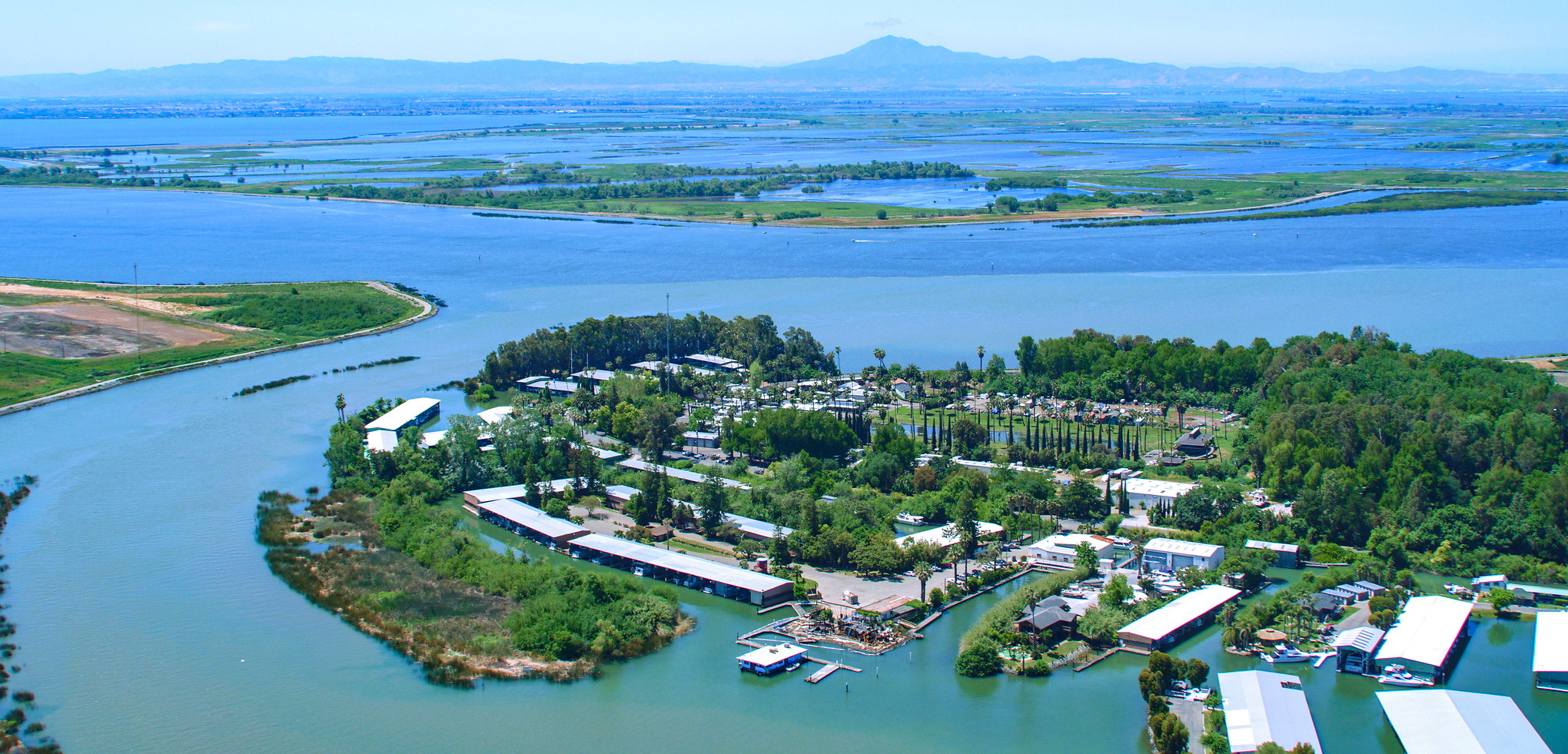
- California State Capitol in Sacramento Elk Grove Cosumnes River Preserve Galt Folsom Sacramento-San Joaquin River Delta

- Flag Seal Wordmark
- Interactive map of Sacramento County
- Location in the state of California
- Coordinates: 38.45°N 121.35°W
- Country: United States
- State: California
- Region: Sacramento Valley, San Joaquin Valley, Sacramento–San Joaquin River Delta
- Metro area: Greater Sacramento
- Incorporated: February 18, 1850
- Named for: The capital city of Sacramento, which is named for the Sacrament of the Holy Eucharist
- County seat (and largest city): Sacramento

Government
  - Type: Council–CEO
  - Body: Board of Supervisors
  - Chair: Rosario Rodriguez
  - Vice Chair: Patrick Hume
  - Board of Supervisors: Supervisors: Phil Serna; Patrick Kennedy; Rich Desmond; Rosario Rodriguez; Patrick Hume
  - County Executive: David Villanueva

Area
  - Total: 994 sq mi (2,570 km^{2})
  - Land: 965 sq mi (2,500 km^{2})
  - Water: 29 sq mi (75 km^{2})
- Highest elevation: 831 ft (253 m)

Population (April 1, 2020)
  - Total: 1,585,055
  - Estimate (2025): 1,618,460 ▲
  - Density: 1,640/sq mi (634/km^{2})

GDP
  - Total: $135.538 billion (2024)
- Time zone: UTC−8 (Pacific Standard Time)
  - Summer (DST): UTC−7 (Pacific Daylight Time)
- Area codes: 209, 916
- FIPS code: 06-067
- Congressional districts: 3rd, 6th, 7th
- Website: saccounty.gov

Sacramento County (/ˌsækrəˈmɛntoʊ/) is located in the U.S. state of California. As of the 2020 United States census, the population was 1,585,055. Its county seat is Sacramento, which has been the state capital of California since 1854.

Sacramento County is the central county of the Greater Sacramento metropolitan area. The county covers about 1,026 square miles (2,660 km^{2}) in the northern portion of the Central Valley, on into Gold Country. Sacramento County extends from the low delta lands between the Sacramento River and San Joaquin River, including Suisun Bay, north to about ten miles (16 km) beyond the State Capitol and east into the foothills of the Sierra Nevada Mountains. The southernmost portion of Sacramento County has direct access to San Francisco Bay. Since 2010, statewide droughts in California have further strained Sacramento County's water security.

== History ==
Sacramento County was one of the original counties of California, which were created in 1850 at the time of statehood. The county was named after the Sacramento River, which forms its western border. The river was named by Spanish cavalry officer Gabriel Moraga for the Santisimo Sacramento (Most Holy Sacrament), referring to the Catholic Eucharist.

== Geography ==
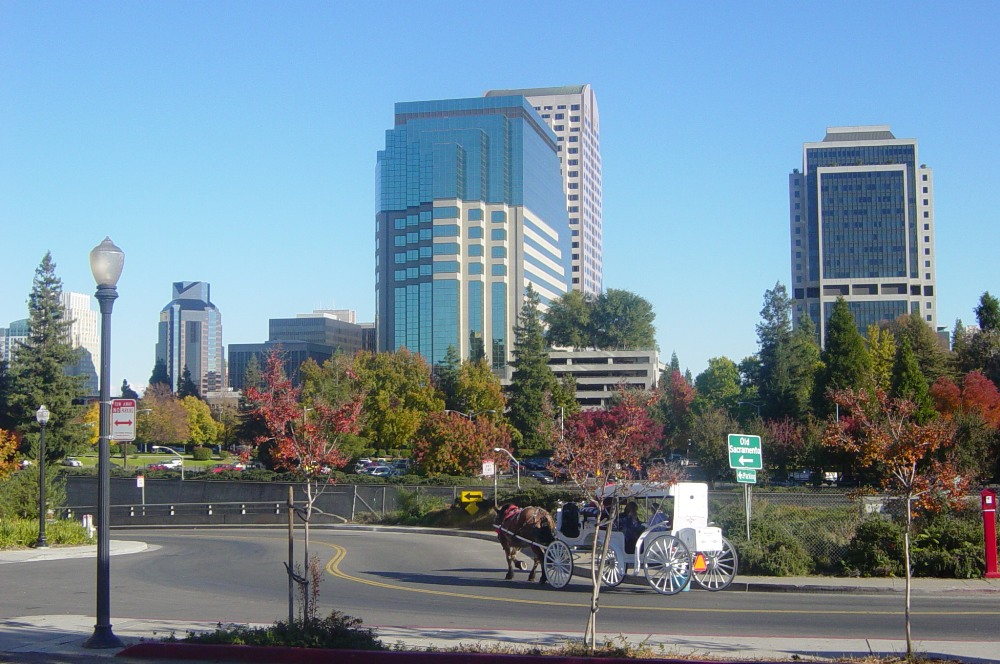
Sacramento

According to the U.S. Census Bureau, the county has a total area of 1,026 square miles (2,660 km^{2}), of which 984 square miles (2,550 km^{2}) is land and 41 square miles (110 km^{2}) (2.0%) is water. Most of the county is at an elevation close to sea level, with some areas below sea level. The highest point in the county is Carpenter Hill at 828 feet (252 m), in the southeast part of Folsom. Major watercourses in the county include the American River, Sacramento River, Cosumnes River, a tributary of the Mokelumne River, and Dry Creek, a tributary of the Sacramento River.

=== Adjacent counties ===
- Sutter County – northwest
- Placer County – north
- El Dorado County – northeast
- Amador County – east
- San Joaquin County – south
- Contra Costa County – southwest
- Solano County – west
- Yolo County – west

=== National protected areas ===
- Stone Lakes National Wildlife Refuge
- California National Historic Trail
- Pony Express National Historic Trail

== Demographics ==
Historical population
Census	Pop.	Note	%±
1850	9,087		—
1860	24,142		165.7%
1870	26,830		11.1%
1880	34,390		28.2%
1890	40,339		17.3%
1900	45,915		13.8%
1910	67,806		47.7%
1920	91,029		34.2%
1930	141,999		56.0%
1940	170,333		20.0%
1950	277,140		62.7%
1960	502,778		81.4%
1970	631,498		25.6%
1980	783,381		24.1%
1990	1,041,219		32.9%
2000	1,223,499		17.5%
2010	1,418,788		16.0%
2020	1,585,055		11.7%
2025 (est.)	1,618,460	▲	2.1%
U.S. Decennial Census; 1790–1960 1900–1990; 1990–2000 2010 2020

=== 2020 census ===
As of the 2020 census, the county had a population of 1,585,055. The median age was 36.9 years. 23.2% of residents were under the age of 18 and 15.0% of residents were 65 years of age or older. For every 100 females there were 95.6 males, and for every 100 females age 18 and over there were 93.1 males age 18 and over.

The racial makeup of the county was 45.2% White, 9.6% Black or African American, 1.2% American Indian and Alaska Native, 17.8% Asian, 1.2% Native Hawaiian and Pacific Islander, 11.7% from some other race, and 13.4% from two or more races. Hispanic or Latino residents of any race comprised 23.6% of the population.

97.6% of residents lived in urban areas, while 2.4% lived in rural areas.

There were 564,445 households in the county, of which 33.5% had children under the age of 18 living with them and 28.9% had a female householder with no spouse or partner present. About 25.1% of all households were made up of individuals and 10.2% had someone living alone who was 65 years of age or older.

There were 587,551 housing units, of which 3.9% were vacant. Among occupied housing units, 57.1% were owner-occupied and 42.9% were renter-occupied. The homeowner vacancy rate was 1.0% and the rental vacancy rate was 4.1%.

=== Racial and ethnic composition ===
Sacramento County, California – Racial and ethnic composition Note: the US Census treats Hispanic/Latino as an ethnic category. This table excludes Latinos from the racial categories and assigns them to a separate category. Hispanics/Latinos may be of any race.
Race / Ethnicity (NH = Non-Hispanic)	Pop 1980	Pop 1990	Pop 2000	Pop 2010	Pop 2020	% 1980	% 1990	% 2000	% 2010	% 2020
White alone (NH)	599,830	721,932	706,655	687,166	650,271	76.57%	69.34%	57.76%	48.43%	41.03%
Black or African American alone (NH)	57,883	93,970	118,073	139,949	145,724	7.39%	9.02%	9.65%	9.86%	9.19%
Native American or Alaska Native alone (NH)	8,827	9,854	9,070	7,875	7,432	1.13%	0.95%	0.74%	0.56%	0.47%
Asian alone (NH)	39,156	92,131	132,601	198,944	276,295	5.00%	8.85%	10.84%	14.02%	17.43%
Native Hawaiian or Pacific Islander alone (NH)	x	x	6,788	13,099	18,011	0.55%	0.92%	0.55%	0.92%	1.14%
Other race alone (NH)	3,544	1,788	3,406	3,418	10,104	0.45%	0.17%	0.28%	0.24%	0.64%
Mixed race or Multiracial (NH)	x	x	51,016	62,141	102,784	x	x	4.17%	4.38%	6.48%
Hispanic or Latino (any race)	74,141	121,544	195,890	306,196	374,434	9.46%	11.67%	16.01%	21.58%	23.62%
Total	783,381	1,041,219	1,223,499	1,418,788	1,585,055	100.00%	100.00%	100.00%	100.00%	100.00%

=== American Community Survey 2025 data ===
The United States Census Bureau estimated that in 2025, Sacramento County’s population was 1.618.460. It was also estimated that the county's population was 38,29% Non-Hispanic White, 24,99% Hispanic or Latino, 8,97% Non-Hispanic Black, 19,67% Asian, 0,46% Native American, 1,26% Pacific Islander, and 6,36% Multiracial.

Total	Population	Percentage
Non-Hispanic White	619.782	38,29%
Hispanic or Latino	404.476	24,99%
Non-Hispanic Black	145.164	8,97%
Asian	318.362	19,67%
Native American	7.371	0,46%
Pacific Islander	20.372	1,26%
Non-Hispanic Multiracial	102.933	6,36%

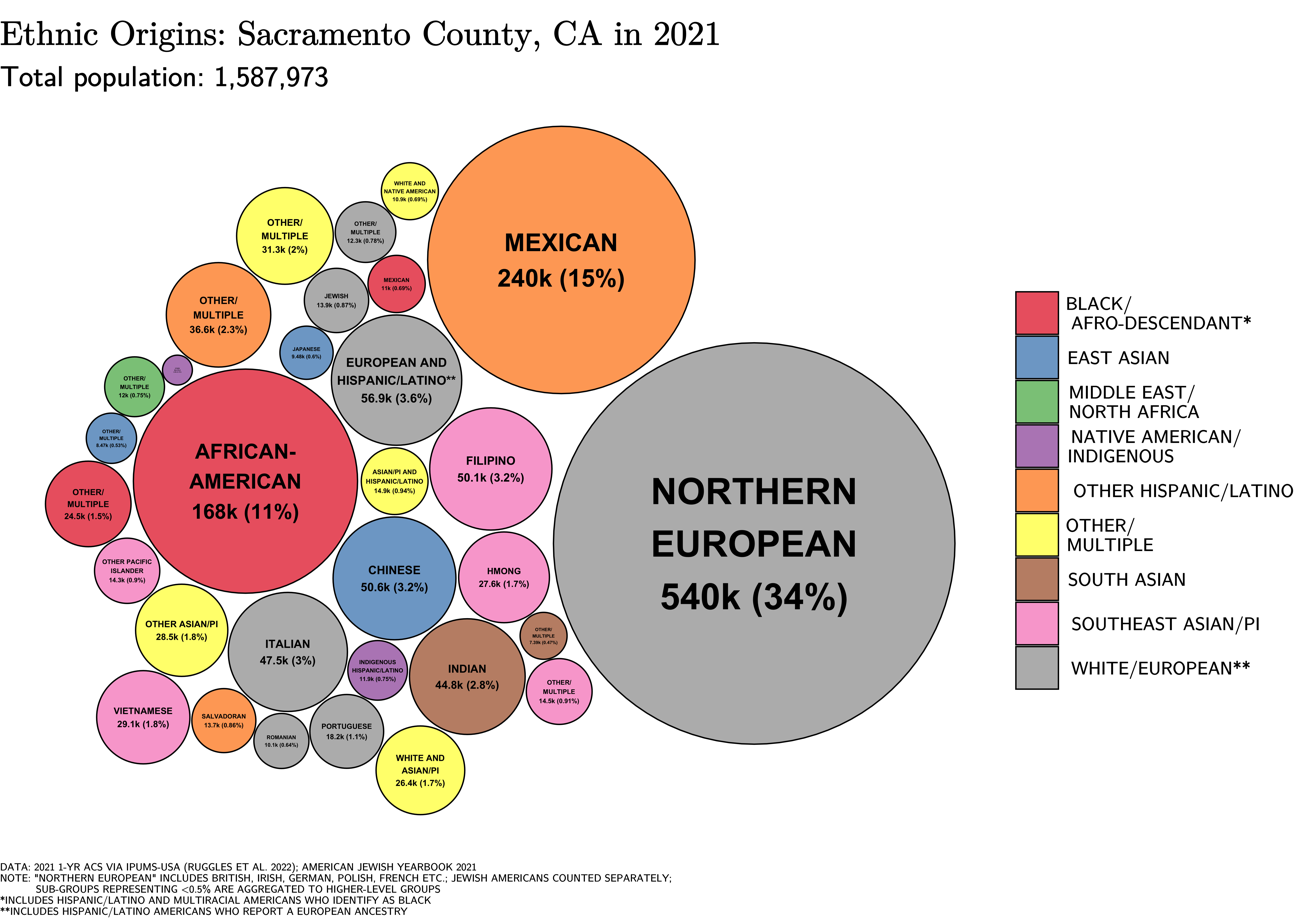
Ethnic origins in Sacramento County

=== 2010 census ===
The 2010 United States census reported that Sacramento County had a population of 1,418,788. The racial makeup of Sacramento County was 815,151 (57.5%) White, 200,228 (15.4%) African American, 14,308 (1.0%) Native American, 203,211 (14.3%) Asian, 13,858 (1.0%) Pacific Islander, 131,691 (9.3%) from other races, and 93,511 (6.6%) from two or more races. There were 306,196 Hispanic or Latino residents of any race (21.6%). Sacramento County has the largest population of Fijian Americans.

Population reported at 2010 United States census
The County	Total; Population	White	African; American	Native; American	Asian	Pacific; Islander	other races	two or more races	Hispanic or Latino (of any race)
Sacramento County	1,418,788	815,151	147,058	14,308	203,211	13,858	131,691	93,511	306,196
Incorporated cities	Total; Population	White	African; American	Native; American	Asian	Pacific; Islander	other races	two or more races	Hispanic or Latino (of any race)
Citrus Heights	83,301	66,856	2,751	753	2,714	363	5,348	4,516	13,734
Elk Grove	153,015	70,478	20,172	965	40,261	1,807	10,231	12,101	27,581
Folsom	72,203	53,627	4,140	427	9,000	173	1,818	3,018	8,064
Galt	23,647	15,639	430	361	815	108	4,834	1,460	10,113
Isleton	804	542	10	10	41	4	139	58	316
Rancho Cordova	64,776	39,123	8,561	668	7,831	556	5,517	4,520	12,740
Sacramento	466,488	210,006	80,005	5,291	85,503	6,655	57,573	33,125	125,276
Census-designated places	Total; Population	White	African; American	Native; American	Asian	Pacific; Islander	other races	two or more races	Hispanic or Latino (of any race)
Antelope	45,770	29,200	4,039	402	6,090	407	2,284	3,348	6,635
Arden-Arcade	92,186	64,688	8,977	948	5,152	531	7,420	5,470	17,147
Carmichael	61,762	49,776	4,972	546	2,653	287	2,035	3,493	7,218
Clay	1,195	981	6	24	8	0	108	68	242
Courtland	355	247	0	6	4	0	75	23	200
Elverta	5,492	4,453	117	77	208	48	302	287	859
Fair Oaks	30,912	26,479	729	255	1,289	57	738	1,365	2,954
Florin	47,513	15,034	9,521	543	13,605	815	6,756	3,239	13,048
Foothill Farms	33,121	21,249	4,628	357	1,731	208	3,362	2,586	7,579
Franklin	155	119	0	0	5	0	20	11	42
Freeport	38	34	0	0	2	0	1	1	6
Fruitridge Pocket	5,800	1,704	1,047	105	1,113	67	1,317	447	2,345
Gold River	7,912	5,837	195	20	1,426	28	97	309	515
Herald	1,184	934	20	13	64	7	105	41	254
Hood	271	135	0	15	15	1	70	35	137
La Riviera	10,802	7,315	1,084	76	766	87	671	803	1,756
Lemon Hill	13,729	5,091	3,493	246	2,394	196	3,487	822	6,790
Mather	4,451	467	99	13	27	21	31	85	110
McClellan Park	743	2,477	393	42	850	84	267	338	704
North Highlands	45,794	27,000	6,003	603	2,067	300	4,709	3,132	10,077
Orangevale	33,960	29,679	463	316	1,040	75	879	1,508	3,448
Parkway	14,670	5,225	3,696	182	1,997	300	3,161	1,109	6,185
Rancho Murieta	5,488	4,874	130	33	158	6	81	206	425
Rio Linda	15,106	11,654	502	235	665	62	1,304	821	3,033
Rosemont	22,681	13,496	2,720	310	2,419	134	1,754	1,848	4,587
Vineyard	24,836	11,306	2,426	163	7,293	256	1,682	1,710	4,414
Walnut Grove	1,542	943	15	24	110	0	402	48	673
Wilton	5,363	4,234	169	45	289	13	343	270	683
Other unincorporated areas	Total; Population	White	African; American	Native; American	Asian	Pacific; Islander	other races	two or more races	Hispanic or Latino (of any race)
All others not CDPs (combined)	24,823	14,249	2,472	234	3,606	202	2,770	1,290	6,306

=== 2000 census ===
As of the census of 2000, there were 1,223,499 people, 453,602 households, and 297,562 families residing in the county. The population density was 1,267 inhabitants per square mile (489/km^{2}). There were 474,814 housing units at an average density of 492 per square mile (190/km^{2}). The racial makeup of the county was 64.0% White, 10.6% Black or African American, 1.09% Native American, 13.5% Asian, 0.6% Pacific Islander, 7.5% from other races, and 5.8% from two or more races. 19.3% of the population were Hispanic or Latino of any race. 10.2% were of German, 7.0% English, 6.7% Irish and 5.1% American ancestry according to Census 2000. 75.7% spoke only English at home; 10.0% spoke Spanish, 1.5% Hmong, 1.4% Chinese or Mandarin, 1.3% Vietnamese, 1.2% Tagalog and 1.2% Russian.

There were 453,602 households, out of which 33.7% had children under the age of 18 living with them, 46.4% were married couples living together, 14.1% had a female householder with no husband present, and 34.4% were non-families. 26.7% of all households were made up of individuals, and 8.0% had someone living alone who was 65 years of age or older. The average household size was 2.64 and the average family size was 3.24.

In the county, 27.6% of the population was under the age of 18, 9.5% was from 18 to 24, 31.0% from 25 to 44, 20.9% from 45 to 64, and 11.1% was 65 years of age or older. The median age was 34 years. For every 100 females, there were 95.9 males. For every 100 female residents aged 18 and over, there were 92.5 males.

The median income for a household in the county was $43,816, and the median income for a family was $50,717. Males had a median income of $39,482 versus $31,569 for females. The per capita income for the county was $21,142. About 10.3% of families and 14.1% of the population were below the poverty line, including 20.2% of those under age 18 and 6.6% of those age 65 or over.

== Government and policing ==
=== Government ===
The Government of Sacramento County is defined and authorized under the California Constitution, California law, and the Charter of the County of Sacramento. Much of the Government of California is in practice the responsibility of county governments such as the Government of Sacramento County, while municipalities such as the city of Sacramento and Folsom provide additional, often non-essential services.

It is composed of the elected five-member Board of Supervisors (BOS), which operates in a legislative, executive, and quasi-judicial capacity. Other elected county offices include the Sheriff, District Attorney, and Assessor, and numerous county departments and entities under the supervision of the County Executive Officer. In addition, several entities of the government of California have jurisdiction conterminous with Sacramento County, such as the Sacramento County Superior Court.

As of 2026, the supervisors are:

- Phil Serna, District 1
- Patrick Kennedy, District 2
- Rich Desmond, District 3
- Rosario Rodriguez, District 4
- Pat Hume, District 5

The Sacramento County Code is the codified law of Sacramento County in the form of local ordinances passed by the Board of Supervisors.

=== Policing ===
The Sacramento County Sheriff provides court protection and jail management for the entire county. It provides patrol and detective services for the unincorporated areas of the county. Incorporated municipalities within the county that have their own municipal police departments or contract with the Sacramento County sheriff for their policing are: Elk Grove, 170,000, municipal department; Citrus Heights, 88,000, municipal department; Folsom, 78,000, municipal department; Isleton, sheriff contract; Rancho Cordova, 73,000, sheriff contract; Galt, population 26,000, municipal department.

Other law enforcement agencies in the county include the Sacramento County Park Rangers that service the County Parks, Twin Rivers Unified School District Police servicing police services for Twin Rivers School District, and the Fulton-El Camino Park District Police Department servicing Recreation and Park Districts.

The Fulton-El Camino Park District Police operating under the Fulton-El Camino Recreation and Park District was disbanded as of November 26, 2024, following an alleged mismanagement of government funds, ethical and moral dilemmas by Emily Ballus (General Manager) and Beth Johnson (Interim Chief of Police). ABC10 conducted an investigation regarding misappropriation of funds.

== Politics ==
=== Voter registration ===
Population and registered voters
Total population	1,585,055	
Registered voters (Note: Percentage of registered voters with respect to total population. Percentages of party members with respect to registered voters follow.)	907,431	57.2%
Democratic	404,232	44.6%
Republican	234,257	25.8%
Democratic–Republican spread	+169,975	+18.8%
Independent	41,392	4.6%
Green	4,784	0.6%
Libertarian	11,248	1.2%
Peace and Freedom	6,329	0.7%
Unknown	4,618	0.5%
Other	3,449	0.4%
No party preference	197,122	21.7%

==== Cities by population and voter registration ====
Cities by population and voter registration
City	Population	Registered voters	Democratic	Republican	D–R spread	Other	No party preference
Citrus Heights	87,036	59.3%	33.7%	37.1%	-3.4%	9.7%	19.6%
Elk Grove	177,221	64.2%	45.7%	24.6%	+20.9%	6.9%	22.8%
Folsom	82,140	65.9%	35.6%	34.1%	+1.5%	7.9%	22.5%
Galt	25,665	60.4%	33.3%	38.6%	-5.3%	8.4%	19.7%
Isleton	649	60.4%	40.0%	27.3%	+12.7%	10.7%	21.9%
Rancho Cordova	80,656	56.7%	40.8%	28.5%	+12.3%	8.4%	22.3%
Sacramento	524,802	54.8%	54.3%	16.0%	+38.3%	7.4%	22.3%

=== Overview ===
Sacramento County was politically competitive in most presidential elections between 1976 and 2004, but now votes significantly in favor of the Democratic candidates. Candidates from the Democratic Party have carried the county in the past eight presidential elections, and have won a majority of the county's votes five times during that timespan. The city of Sacramento is strongly Democratic, while rural areas are strongly Republican; suburban areas are more divided. This pattern is also present in congressional and state legislative elections. The last Republican presidential candidate to win a majority in the county was George H. W. Bush in 1988.

United States presidential election results for Sacramento County, California
Year	Republican		Democratic		Third party(ies)	
Year	No.	%	No.	%	No.	%
1880	3,794	56.11%	2,817	41.66%	151	2.23%
1884	4,367	60.15%	2,659	36.63%	234	3.22%
1888	4,769	56.37%	3,447	40.74%	244	2.88%
1892	4,362	48.92%	3,498	39.23%	1,057	11.85%
1896	4,600	47.68%	4,831	50.07%	217	2.25%
1900	5,506	54.78%	4,325	43.03%	220	2.19%
1904	6,666	65.23%	2,384	23.33%	1,170	11.45%
1908	6,515	55.15%	4,533	38.37%	766	6.48%
1912	36	0.19%	9,869	51.39%	9,300	48.42%
1916	10,696	40.19%	14,538	54.63%	1,379	5.18%
1920	15,634	64.87%	7,150	29.67%	1,316	5.46%
1924	13,400	41.08%	2,285	7.01%	16,932	51.91%
1928	20,762	50.83%	19,684	48.19%	403	0.99%
1932	14,553	27.74%	36,370	69.32%	1,542	2.94%
1936	12,119	20.14%	47,265	78.53%	800	1.33%
1940	23,201	30.76%	51,351	68.09%	864	1.15%
1944	24,611	33.16%	49,204	66.30%	403	0.54%
1948	35,074	37.78%	54,197	58.38%	3,571	3.85%
1952	67,207	49.02%	69,066	50.37%	837	0.61%
1956	67,686	45.10%	82,134	54.73%	260	0.17%
1960	84,252	43.26%	109,695	56.32%	809	0.42%
1964	77,871	34.17%	149,668	65.68%	332	0.15%
1968	97,177	41.66%	118,769	50.92%	17,300	7.42%
1972	141,218	49.00%	137,287	47.63%	9,716	3.37%
1976	123,110	44.63%	144,203	52.27%	8,563	3.10%
1980	153,721	47.72%	130,031	40.37%	38,368	11.91%
1984	204,922	55.56%	159,128	43.14%	4,791	1.30%
1988	201,832	51.01%	188,557	47.65%	5,301	1.34%
1992	160,366	35.36%	197,540	43.56%	95,606	21.08%
1996	166,049	40.76%	203,019	49.83%	38,346	9.41%
2000	195,619	45.33%	212,792	49.31%	23,139	5.36%
2004	235,539	49.29%	236,657	49.52%	5,670	1.19%
2008	213,583	39.47%	316,506	58.49%	11,012	2.04%
2012	202,514	39.19%	300,503	58.15%	13,792	2.67%
2016	189,789	33.93%	326,023	58.29%	43,518	7.78%
2020	259,405	36.11%	440,808	61.36%	18,227	2.54%
2024	252,140	38.39%	381,564	58.10%	23,043	3.51%

In gubernatorial elections, Sacramento County is typically a bellwether, having voted for the winner every time since 1962 with the exception of 1970 and 2002.

Gubernatorial elections results

Gubernatorial elections results
Year	Republican	Democratic
2022	42.5% 202,933	57.5% 274,680
2018	41.2% 212,010	58.8% 302,696
2014	37.7% 122,342	62.3% 202,416
2010	38.5% 162,369	56.7% 239,599
2006	60.5% 218,889	34.2% 123,685
2002	46.6% 147,456	40.8% 129,143
1998	39.7% 142,970	57.4% 206,870
1994	54.8% 196,229	40.9% 146,423
1990	50.3% 167,982	44.7% 149,215
1986	68.1% 207,086	30.1% 91,660
1982	52.4% 171,176	44.7% 146,167
1978	34.7% 88,445	54.9% 139,821
1974	45.9% 104,595	51.6% 117,711
1970	46.0% 105,523	52.5% 120,365
1966	50.9% 109,801	49.1% 105,861
1962	37.7% 71,788	60.7% 115,462

In the House of Representatives, all of California's 6th congressional district and portions of its 3rd, and 7th districts are in the county.

In the State Assembly, all of the 7th and 8th districts and parts of the 6th, 9th, and 11th districts are in the county.

In the State Senate, parts of the 1st, 3rd, 4th, 6th, and 8th districts are in the county.

According to the California Secretary of State, as of October 22, 2012, Sacramento County has 698,899 registered voters, out of 944,243 eligible (74%). Of those, 306,960 (44%) are registered Democrats, 225,688 (32%) are registered Republicans, and 134,677 (19%) have declined to state a political party.

== Crime ==
The following table includes the number of incidents reported and the rate per 1,000 persons for each type of offense.

Population and crime rates
Population	1,408,480	
Violent crime	8,988	6.38
Homicide	70	0.05
Forcible rape	448	0.32
Robbery	3,282	2.33
Aggravated assault	5,188	3.68
Property crime	31,835	22.60
Burglary	12,526	8.89
Larceny-theft	30,971	21.99
Motor vehicle theft	8,624	6.12
Arson	366	0.26

=== Cities by population and crime rates ===
Cities by population and crime rates
City	Population	Violent crimes	Violent crime rate per 1,000 persons	Property crimes	Property crime rate per 1,000 persons
Citrus Heights	85,112	329	3.87	3,117	36.62
Elk Grove	156,344	512	3.27	3,292	21.06
Folsom	73,678	85	1.15	1,277	17.33
Galt	24,163	59	2.44	470	19.45
Rancho Cordova	66,214	393	5.94	2,107	31.82
Sacramento	476,557	3,520	7.39	19,967	41.90

== Education ==
=== Colleges and universities ===
Public universities

- California State University Sacramento
- UC Davis Extension
  - UC Davis School of Medicine
  - UC Davis Betty Irene Moore School of Nursing

Community colleges

- Los Rios Community College District
  - American River College
  - Cosumnes River College
  - Folsom Lake College
  - Sacramento City College
- San Joaquin Delta Community College District
- Sierra Joint Community College District

Private, not for profit

- University of the Pacific in Sacramento
- National University Sacramento Regional Campus
- University of San Francisco Regional Campus
- University of Southern California Extension
- Western Seminary
- Epic Bible College

Private, for profit

- Alliant International University
- California Northstate University College of Pharmacy
- Chamberlain University Rancho Cordova
- DeVry University
- Lincoln Law School of Sacramento
- MTI College
- Professional School of Psychology
- San Joaquin Valley College
- Universal Technical Institute
- University of Phoenix Sacramento Valley

=== K-12 education ===
School districts include:

K-12:

- Center Joint Unified School District
- Elk Grove Unified School District
- Folsom-Cordova Unified School District
- Natomas Unified School District
- River Delta Unified School District
- Sacramento City Unified School District
- San Juan Unified School District
- Twin Rivers Unified School District - Includes some areas for grades K-12, some for 7–12 only, and some for 9–12 only

Secondary:

- Galt Joint Union High School District
- Roseville Joint Union High School District

Elementary:

- Arcohe Union School District
- Dry Creek Joint Elementary School District
- Elverta Joint Elementary School District
- Galt Joint Union Elementary School District
- Robla Elementary School District

== Transportation ==
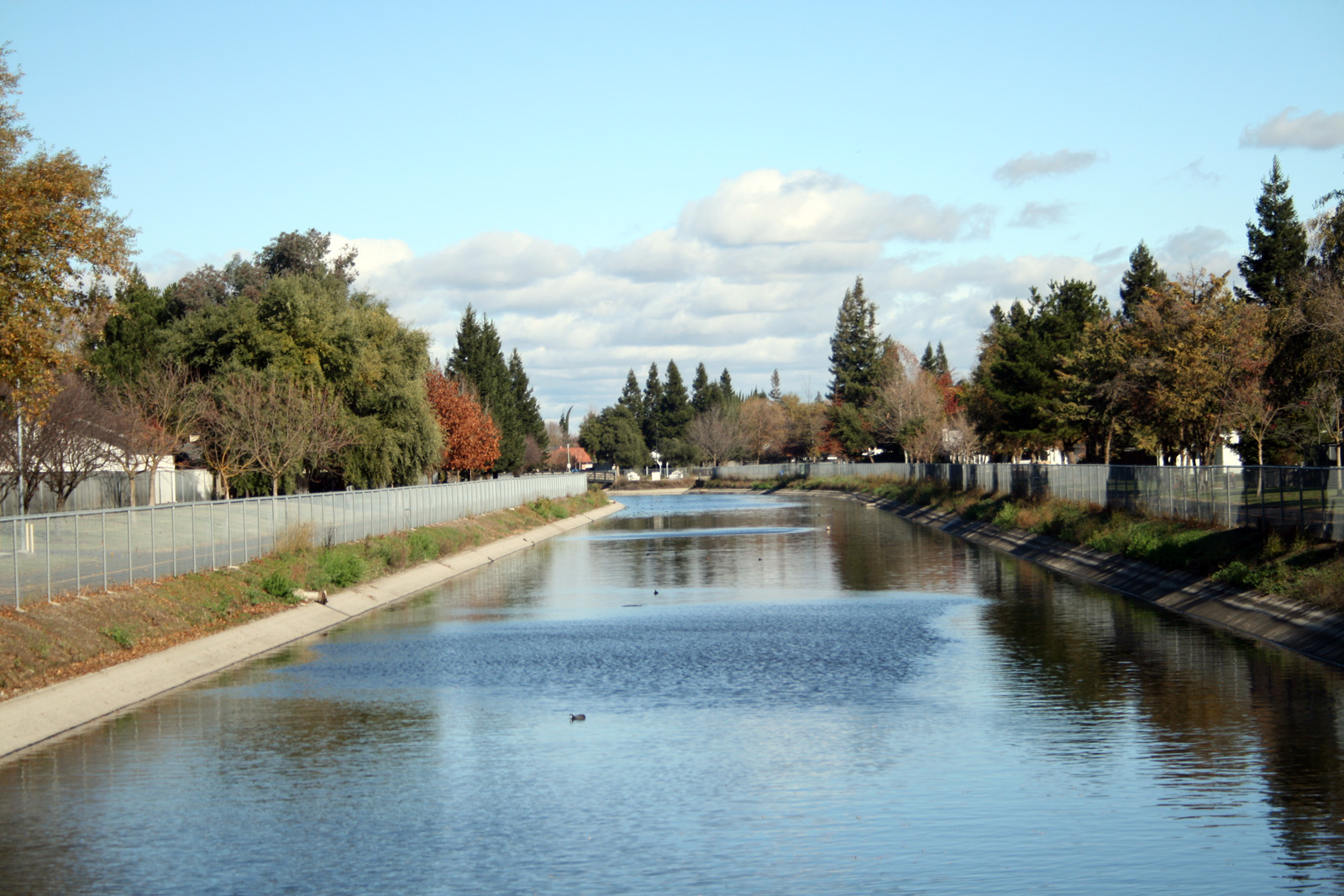
Pocket-Greenhaven

=== Public Transportation ===
Sacramento Regional Transit District, also known as Sacramento RT, provides public transit throughout the county. It operates bus services, as well as light rail services on the Blue, Green, and Gold lines. In addition, the Yolobus provides Sacramento County with service connecting to destinations in neighboring Yolo County, such as Davis. SacRT and Yolobus both provide bus services connecting Sacramento with Sacramento International Airport.

Amtrak and its Amtrak California subsidiary operate passenger rail service from the Sacramento Valley station. This station is served by the Coast Starlight, the California Zephyr, the Capitol Corridor, and the Gold Runner, which link the region with destinations across California and the United States.

=== Major highways ===
- I-5
- I-80
  - I-80 BL
    - I-305 (unsigned)
    - SR 51 (unsigned)
- US 50
- SR 12
- SR 16
- SR 84
- SR 99
- SR 104
- SR 160
- SR 220
- SR 244
- SR 275

=== Airports ===
Sacramento International Airport is a major, full-service airport with passenger flights. It is owned by the County of Sacramento. The county also owns Sacramento Mather Airport in Rancho Cordova and Sacramento Executive Airport, both of which are general aviation airports. Sacramento McClellan Airport, formerly McClellan Air Force Base, is a privately owned airport between North Highlands and Rio Linda. There are also privately owned public use airports located in Elk Grove and Rio Linda.

=== Public roadways ===
The Sacramento County Department of Transportation (SACDOT) maintains approximately 2200 miles of roadway within the unincorporated area. The roads range from six lane thoroughfares to rural roads.

== Communities ==
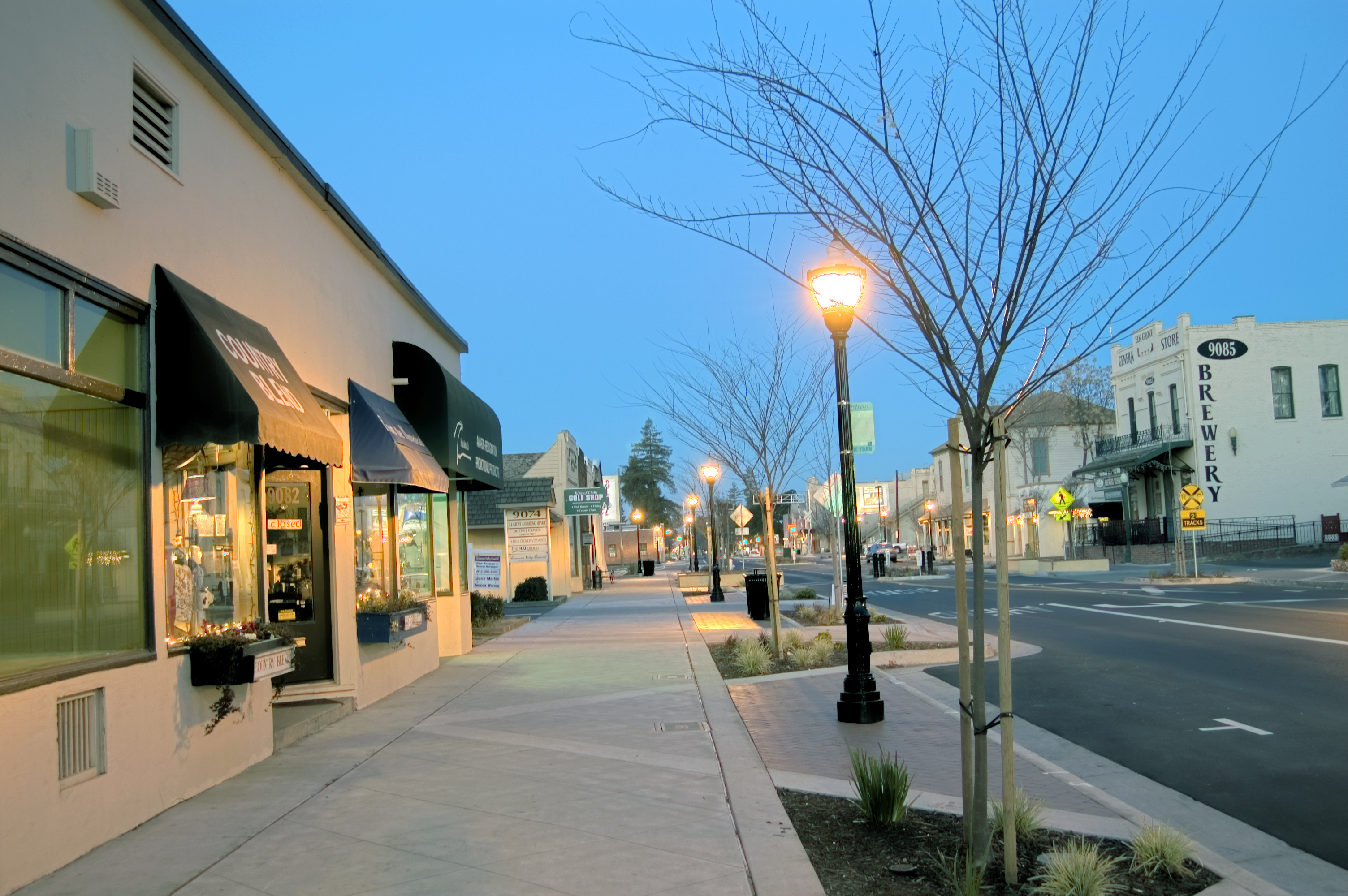
Elk Grove

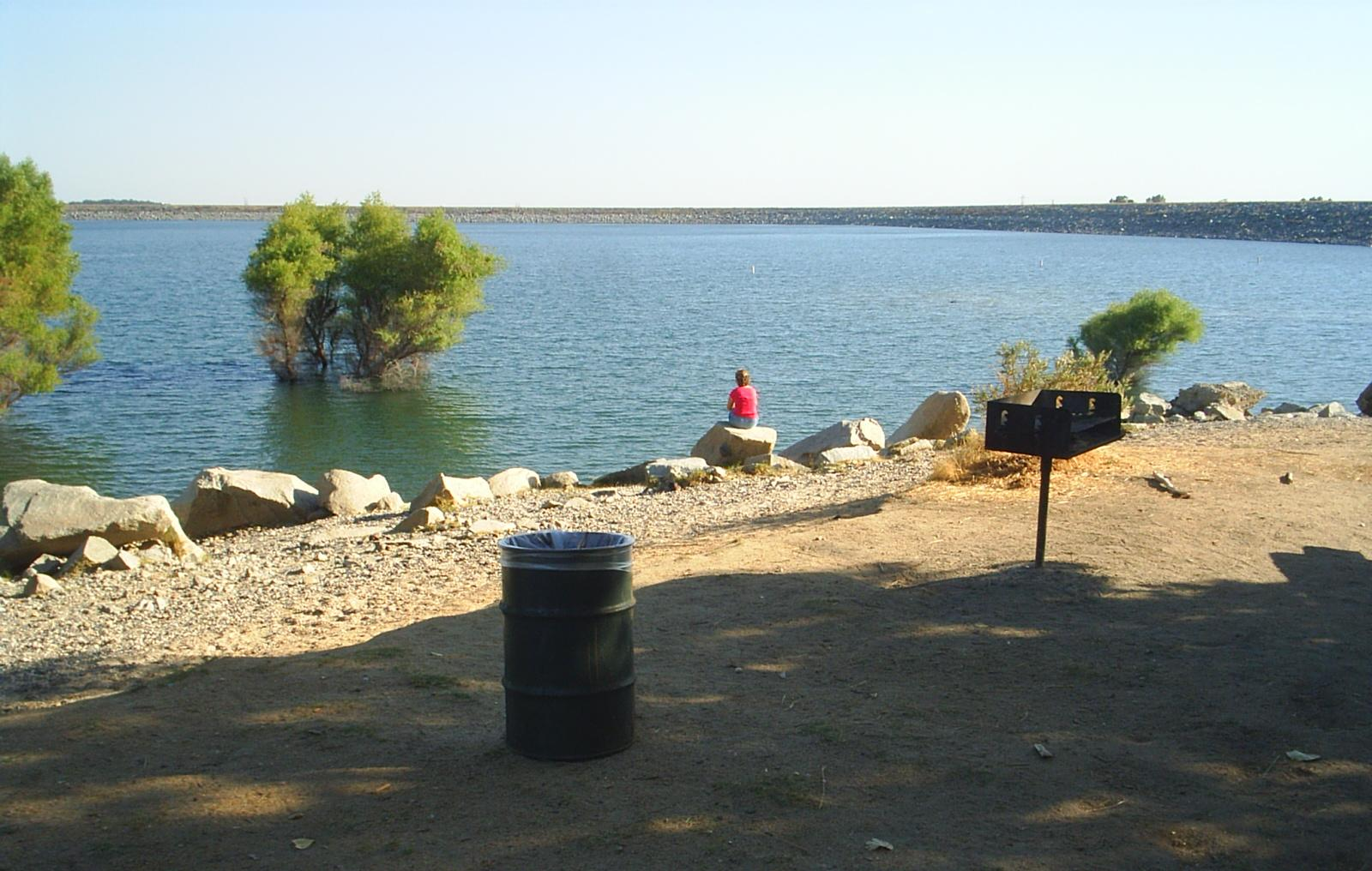
Folsom Lake

=== Cities ===
- Citrus Heights
- Elk Grove
- Folsom
- Galt
- Isleton
- Rancho Cordova
- Sacramento (county seat)

=== Census-designated places ===
- Antelope
- Arden-Arcade
- Carmichael
- Clay
- Courtland
- Elverta
- Fair Oaks
- Florin
- Foothill Farms
- Franklin
- Freeport
- Fruitridge Pocket
- Gold River
- Herald
- Hood
- La Riviera
- Lemon Hill
- Mather
- McClellan Park
- North Highlands
- Orangevale
- Parkway
- Rancho Murieta
- Rio Linda
- Rosemont
- Vineyard
- Walnut Grove
- Wilton

=== Unincorporated community ===
- Locke

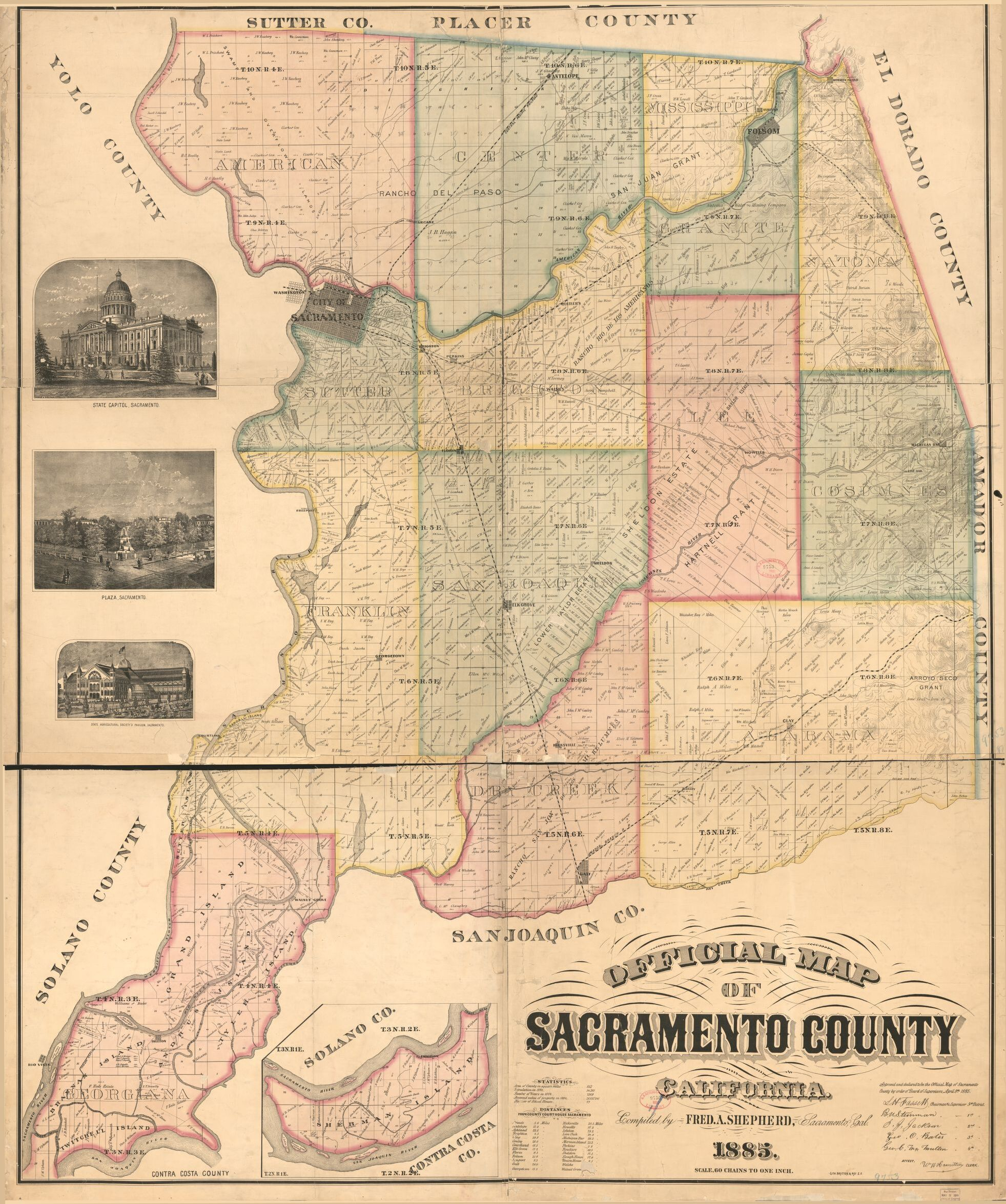
The 14 civil townships, 1885

=== Former townships ===
In February 1851, the county was divided into eight civil townships: the seven marked by asterisks below, plus Sacramento township. In July of that year, American township was divided off from Sacramento township. In 1856, the Board of Supervisors realigned the divisions into the 14 civil townships below, plus the city of Sacramento.

- Alabama
- American
- Brighton*
- Center*
- Cosumnes*
- Dry Creek
- Franklin
- Georgiana
- Granite
- Lee
- Mississippi*
- Natoma*
- San Joaquin*
- Sutter*

=== Population ranking ===
The population ranking of the following table is based on the 2020 census of Sacramento County.

† county seat

Rank	City/town/etc.	Municipal type	Population (2020 Census)
1	† Sacramento (State Capital)	City	524,943
2	Elk Grove	City	176,124
3	Arden-Arcade	CDP	94,659
4	Citrus Heights	City	87,583
5	Folsom	City	80,454
6	Carmichael	CDP	79,793
7	Rancho Cordova	City	79,332
8	Florin	CDP	52,388
9	North Highlands	CDP	49,327
10	Antelope	CDP	48,733
11	Vineyard	CDP	43,935
12	Foothill Farms	CDP	35,834
13	Orangevale	CDP	35,569
14	Fair Oaks	CDP	32,514
15	Galt	City	25,383
16	Rosemont	CDP	23,510
17	Parkway	CDP	15,962
18	Rio Linda	CDP	15,944
19	Lemon Hill	CDP	14,496
20	La Riviera	CDP	11,252
21	Gold River	CDP	7,844
22	Fruitridge Pocket	CDP	6,102
23	Wilton	CDP	5,958
24	Rancho Murieta	CDP	5,903
25	Elverta	CDP	5,435
26	Mather	CDP	4,698
27	Walnut Grove	CDP	1,452
28	Clay	CDP	1,252
29	Herald	CDP	1,160
30	McClellan Park	CDP	926
31	Isleton	City	794
32	Courtland	CDP	326
33	Hood	CDP	244
34	Franklin	CDP	167
35	Freeport	CDP	58

== See also ==
- History of Sacramento, California
- List of California Historical Landmarks in Sacramento County
- List of school districts in Sacramento County, California
- National Register of Historic Places listings in Sacramento County, California
- Sacramento Metropolitan Cable Television Commission
