= Twin Rivers Unified School District =

School district in McClellan, California, US

Address
- 5115 Dudley Boulevard McClellan Park, California, 95652; United States

District information
- Type: Public school district
- Grades: K–12
- Established: 2007; 19 years ago
- President: Chris Jefferson
- NCES District ID: 0601332

Students and staff
- Enrollment: 24,513 (2022–2023)
- Teachers: 1,088.72 (FTE)
- Staff: 1,434.31 (FTE)
- Student–teacher ratio: 22.5:1

Other information
- Website: www.trusd.net

Twin Rivers Unified School District is a school district in McClellan, California, United States. The district office is located at 5115 Dudley Boulevard, McClellan, California.

Twin Rivers operates a fleet of 25 battery electric buses, with an additional ten on order. It also operates 35 buses powered by compressed natural gas and 60 powered by renewable diesel.

== History ==
The district was created as a result of the November 2007 approval of Measure B, a proposal to merge the four North Sacramento area school districts: the North Sacramento School District, the Del Paso Heights School District, the Rio Linda Union School District, and the Grant Joint Union High School District. Originally referred to as New North Area Unified School District after Measure B passed, the name Twin Rivers was selected from among 300 submitted by community members during a three-week naming contest.

== 2026 teachers' strike ==
After a year of negotiations between Twin Rivers and the Twin Rivers United Educators, on March 5, 2026, approximately 1,500 teachers went on strike. The union argued that wages were too low compared to other nearby districts, medical coverage was not enough, classrooms were not receiving enough funding, and classes were too large. The strike ended on March 22, 2026 after an agreement was reached between the union and the district.

== Administration ==
- Dr. Tu Moua Carroz, superintendent
- Josh Mason, Chief Academic Officer
- Wesley Marshall, Associate Superintendent, Human Resources
- Ryan DiGiulio, Chief Business Official
- David Lugo, Chief of Police

On December 4, 2007, the trustees selected Frank Porter to serve as Twin Rivers USD interim auperintendent. Porter, who had been the superintendent of the Rio Linda Union School District was selected for the job over Ramona Bishop, the superintendent of the Del Paso Heights Elementary School District. The new district assumed operational responsibility for the 37,000 students in the four merging districts on July 1, 2008.

Frank Porter announced his retirement as of June 30, 2012 after four and a half years as the district's superintendent. Rob Ball served about three months as acting superintendent and Joe Williams served 10 months as the interim superintendent. From July 1, 2013 until June 30, 2026, Dr. Steven Martinez, previously of Fresno Unified, served as the district superintendent. Effective July 1, 2026, Dr. Tu Moua Carroz began her tenure as district superintendent.

Five of the district's assistant superintendents have become superintendents. Debra LaVoi, Ed.D., became the superintendent at Woodland Joint Unified in July 2009 until her retirement in July 2014. Ramona Bishop, Ed.D., became the superintendent at Vallejo City Unified in April 2011. Gloria Hernandez-Goff, Ed.D., became the superintendent of the Ravenswood School District in May 2013. Rusty Clark became the superintendent of the Pleasant Ridge School District near Grass Valley in June 2013. In June 2020, Andy Weather, director of special projects, became superintendent of the Grass Valley School District. Dr. Shelly Holt, secondary curriculum director for the district when it first started, is now in the Fontana Unified School District in Southern California.

== Boundary ==
A portion of the City of Sacramento is within the district, with portions for grades K-12, and others for grades 7-12. North Sacramento and Del Paso Heights Norte Del Rio High School also served this area until its closure in the 1980s.

Three of Sacramento's west side suburbs are served by Twin Rivers Schools:

- Foothill Farms
- North Highlands
- Rio Linda

Other territories within TRUSD include portions of Elverta (for grades 9-12) and portions of McClellan Park (for grades 7-12). The district takes students in grades 7-12 from the territory of Robla Elementary School District, while it takes students in grades 9-12 from the territory of Elverta Joint Elementary School District..

== Schools ==
=== High schools ===
- Foothill High School
- Grant Union High school
- Highlands High School
- Rio Linda High School

=== Middle schools ===
- Foothill Ranch Middle School
- Martin Luther King Jr. Tech Academy
- Norwood Junior High
- Rio Linda Preparatory Academy
- Rio Tierra Junior High
- Smythe Academy of Arts and Sciences Middle School

=== Elementary schools ===
- Allison Elementary
- Babcock Elementary
- Castori Elementary
- Del Paso Heights Elementary
- Dry Creek Elementary
- F.C. Joyce PK-8
- Fairbanks Elementary
- Foothill Oaks Elementary
- Frontier Elementary
- Garden Valley Elementary
- Hagginwood Elementary
- Hazel Strauch Elementary
- Hillsdale Elementary
- Kohler Elementary
- Las Palmas Elementary
- Madison Elementary
- Northlake TK-8
- Northwood Elementary
- Oakdale School PK-8
- Orchard Elementary
- Pioneer TK-8
- Regency Park Elementary
- Ridgepoint Elementary
- Sierra View Elementary
- Village Elementary
- Westside Elementary
- Woodlake Elementary
- Woodridge Elementary

== Board of trustees ==
The trustees are:

- Michael Baker, Clerk of the Board
- Christine Jefferson, President of the Board
- Stacey E. Bastian
- Sasha Vogt, Vice President of the Board
- Basim Elkarra
- Emanuel Amanfor
- Sharon Reichelt

== Notable alumni ==
There have been several students and staff members of the schools within the Twin Rivers USD.

- Sean Chambers - Highlands High School Class of 1983, Alaska Aces star player
- Lloyd Connelly - Sacramento County judge, former assemblymember and Sacramento City councilmember
- Scott Galbraith - Highlands High School Class of 1985, former professional American football tight end in the NFL for nine seasons, played in Super Bowl XXVIII with the champion Dallas Cowboys
- Grantland Johnson - Grant Union High School, former California secretary of Health and Human Services
- Darren Oliver - Rio Linda High, pitcher for Anaheim Angels, MLB
- George Wright - Grant Union High School, organist
