= Sacramento Metropolitan Fire District =

Fire department serving Sacramento County, California, US

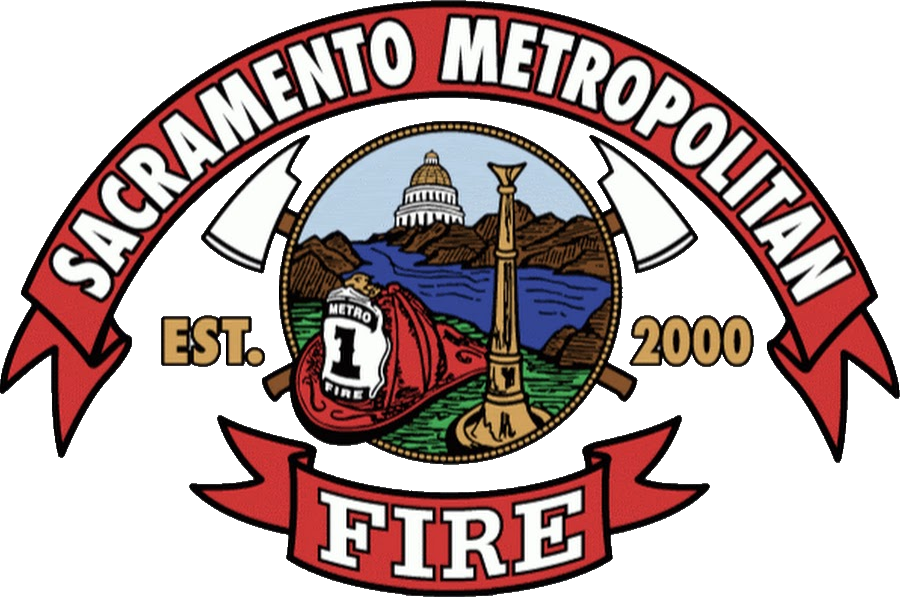

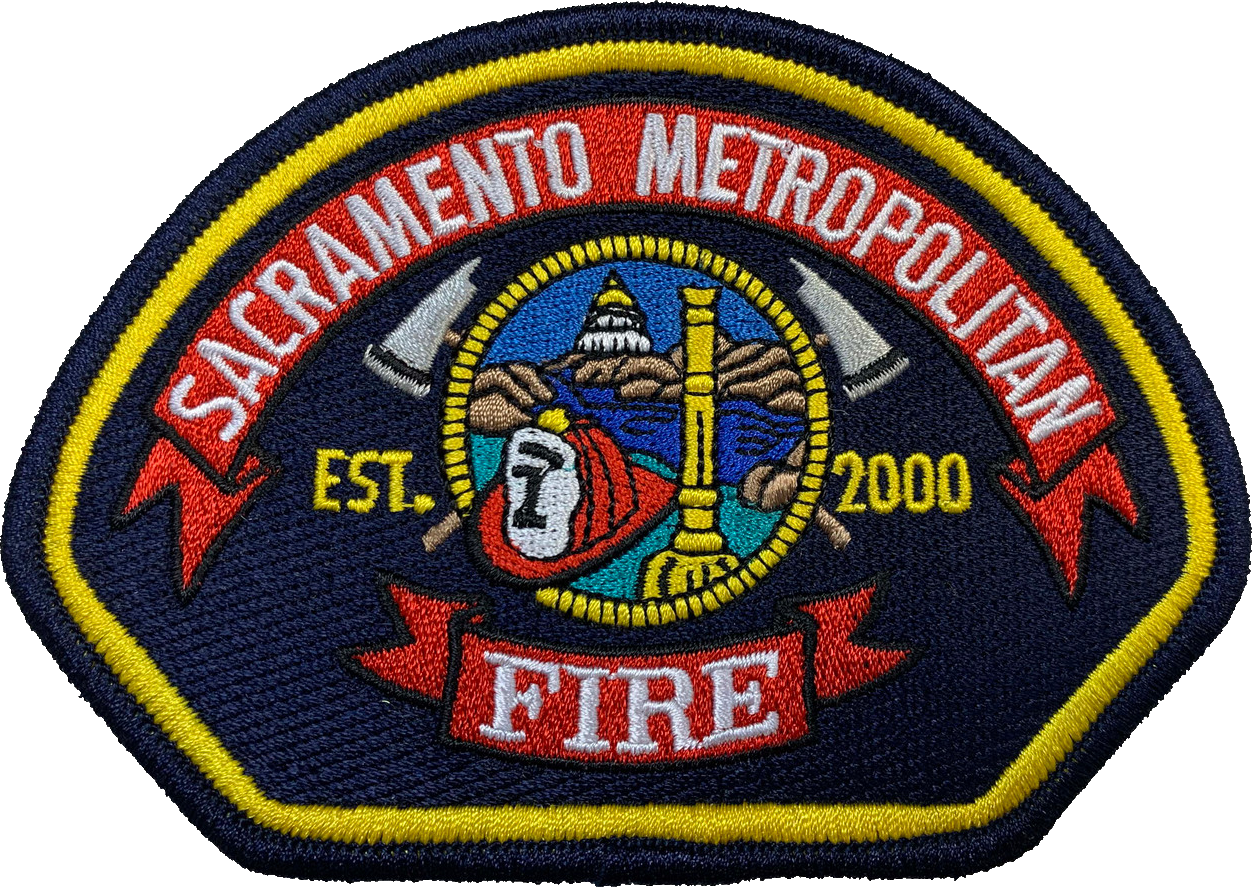

Operational area
- Country: United States
- State: California
- County: Sacramento
- Address: 10545 Armstrong Ave. Suite 200 Mather, CA 95655

Agency overview
- Established: 2000
- Annual calls: 108,000
- Employees: 699 (2023)
- Annual budget: $279,505,341 (2023)
- Staffing: Career
- Fire chief: Adam House
- EMS level: ALS
- IAFF: 522

Facilities and equipment
- Battalions: 5
- Stations: 42
- Engines: 37
- Trucks: 5
- Squads: 2
- Rescues: 1
- Ambulances: 27
- Tenders: 6
- HAZMAT: 1
- Airport crash: 2
- Wildland: 16 - Type 3; 13 - Type 4
- Bulldozers: 2
- Helicopters: 3
- Mobile Integrated Healthcare: 1

Website
- Official website
- IAFF website

The Sacramento Metropolitan Fire District (commonly referred to as "Metro Fire") provides fire protection and emergency medical services to many unincorporated areas of Sacramento County, California as well as two contract cities. The fire district is responsible for the cities and communities of Antelope, Arden-Arcade, Carmichael, Citrus Heights, Elverta, Fair Oaks, Florin, Gold River, La Riviera, North Highlands, Mather, Orangevale, Rancho Cordova, Rio Linda, Rosemont, Sloughhouse, Vineyard and McClellan Airfield.

"Metro Fire" also operates a variety of Special Operations divisions:

- Aircraft Rescue and Firefighting (ARFF)
- Community Emergency Response Team (CERT)
- Dozer Operations
- Emergency Operations Plan Management
- Foam Operations, Hazardous Materials (HazMat) response
- Technical Rescue
- Tactical Emergency Medical SWAT (TEMS)
- Urban Area Security Initiative (UASI)
- Unmanned Aerial Vehicles (UAV)
- Urban Search and Rescue (US&R or USAR)
- Water Rescue.

== USAR Task Force 7 ==
The Sacramento Metropolitan Fire District is a member of California USAR Task Force 7 (CA TF-7), one of the eight FEMA Urban Search and Rescue Task Forces in the state. Though originally for earthquake response, the Task Force is also used for general disaster and event response. Along with members of the SMFD, the task force also has members from the Cosumnes Fire Department, Folsom Fire Department, Roseville Fire Department, West Sacramento Fire Department, El Dorado County Fire Protection District and Sacramento Fire Department.

Some of the teams most notable deployments include the Northridge earthquake (1994), Oklahoma City bombing (1995), World Trade Center (2001) and Hurricane Katrina (2005).

== Metro Medic Program (MMP) ==
In 2023, the Single Role Program (SRP) transitioned into the Metro Medic Program (MMP), catering to individuals interested in Emergency Medical Services (EMS) who prefer not to pursue a career in fire suppression as medics.

== Stations & apparatus ==
Fire Station Number	Address	Engine Company	Medic Units	Truck Company	Wildland Engine, Water Tender or Dozer Unit	Other units	Battalion
21	Citrus Heights	Engine 21	Medic 21			Rescue 21, CERT 1, CERT 2	13
22	Orangevale	Engine 22	In Service Reserve Medic 22		Engine 322		13
23	Citrus Heights	Engine 23	MMP Medic 23	Truck 23			13
24	Sacramento	Engine 24	Medic 24 MMP Medic 224			Squad 24 OES Type 1	5
25	Sacramento	Engine 25	Medic 25		Engine 325		5
26	Antelope	Engine 26		Truck 26	Engine 326		5
27	Citrus Heights	Engine 27	In Service Reserve Medic 27		Engine 527		13
28	Citrus Heights	Engine 28			Engine 528		13
29	Orangevale	Engine 29				Battalion 13, OES 8433 Type 3, Special Operations Unit	13
31	Fair Oaks	Engine 31			Engine 531	Foam 31	13
32	Fair Oaks	Engine 32	Medic 32		Engine 332		13
41	North Highlands	Engine 41	Medic 41		Engine 541		5
42	North Highlands	Engine 42					5
50	Florin	Engine 50	Medic 50	Truck 50	Engine 350	OES Type 1, Battalion 9	9
51	Florin	Engine 51	Medic 51		Engine 551		9
53	Florin	Engine 53	MMP Medic 53				9
54	Rosemont	Engine 54	Medic 54		Engine 554		9
55	Vineyard	Engine 55	In service Reserve Medic 55		Engine 355, Water Tender 55		9
58	Sloughhouse				Engine 358, Water Tender 58, Dozer 1, Dozer 2		14
59	Rancho Murieta		Medic 59 and Medic 259		Engine 359, Water Tender 59		14
61	Rancho Cordova	Engine 61	MMP Medic 61		Engine 361	Squad 61	14
62	Rancho Cordova	Engine 62	Medic 62		Engine 562	Boat 62	9
63	Rancho Cordova	Engine 63	In service Reserve Medic 63		Engine 363		14
65	Rancho Cordova	Engine 65	Medic 65	Truck 65	Engine 365	Boat 65 Swift Water Rescue trailer	14
66	Rancho Cordova	Engine 66	Medic 66		Engine 366, Water Tender 66	Battalion 14	14
68	Rancho Cordova	Engine 68			Engine 368		14
101	Sacramento	Engine 101	Medic 101				7
102	Sacramento		EMS 24			MCI 102	7
103	Sacramento	Engine 103			Engine 503		7
105	Sacramento	Engine 105	MMP Medic 105		Engine 505		7
106	Sacramento	Engine 106		Truck 106		Battalion 7	7
108	Fair Oaks	Engine 108			Engine 508		7
109	Carmichael	Engine 109	MMP Medic 109			HazMat 109, Mobile Integrated Healthcare (CC109)	7
110	Sacramento	Engine 110			Engine 510	Decon 110	7
111	Rio Linda	Engine 111	Medic 111		Engine 311		5
112	North Highlands		MMP Medic 112		Engine 112, Engine 512	Air 112, Air 2112	5
114	McClellan	Engine 114			Water Tender 114	ARFF 1, ARFF 2, Battalion 5	5
115	McClellan Airport					Copter 1, Copter 2, Copter 3, Helitender 115	5
116	Elverta	Engine 116			Engine 516, Water Tender 116		5
117	Elverta	Engine 117			Engine 317		5
