= Robla =

Robla may refer to:

- Robla, Sacramento, California, a neighborhood of Sacramento
- Robla Elementary School District, Sacramento County, California
- La Robla, Spain, a municipality
