= Robla, Sacramento, California =

Human settlement in California, United States of America

Coordinates: 38°39′41″N 121°26′48″W

Robla is a neighborhood located within the city of Sacramento, California, United States. The borders of Robla are generally considered to be city limits on the north adjacent to Rio Linda, McClellan Park on the east, the Beltline Freeway Interstate 80 on the south, and Northgate Boulevard on the west. Robla was part of the "Unincorporated place" of Robla, which recorded a population of 11,495 in 1960.
