= 337th Flight Test Squadron =

337th Electronic Warfare Squadron
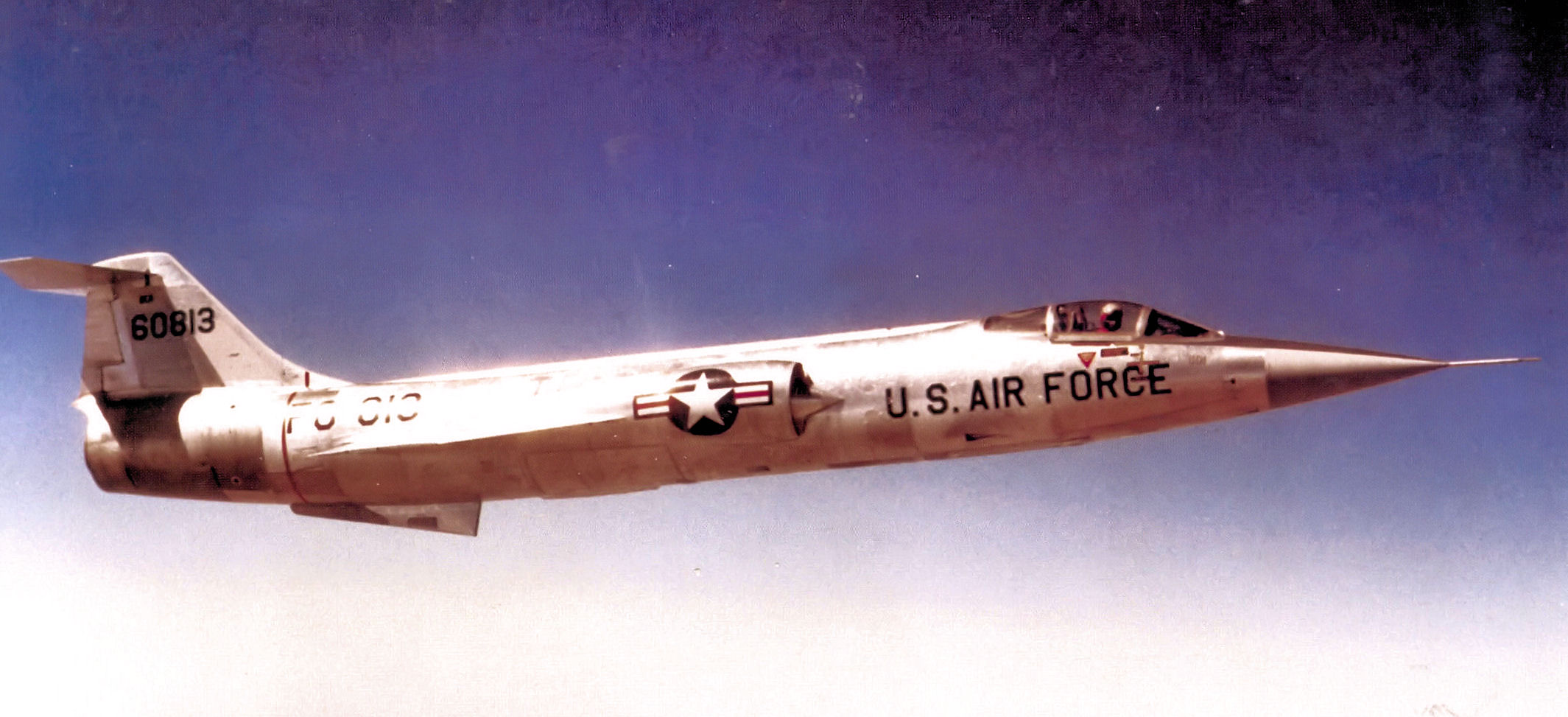
- 337th Fighter-Interceptor Squadron F-104 Starfighter (Note: Aircraft is Lockheed F-104A-20-LO Starfighter serial 56-813, taken on 23 May 1958. This aircraft was transferred to the Tennessee Air National Guard 151st Fighter-Interceptor Squadron. It crashed on 17 May 1962 on a Ground Controlled Approach to Ramstein Air Base, Germany. Dirkx, Marco (8 July 2024). "1956 USAF Serial Numbers". Joe Baugher’s Serial Number List.)
- Active: 1942–1944; 1954–1960; 1982–1985; 1988–2001
- Country: United States
- Branch: United States Air Force
- Role: Flight test
- Nickname: Falcons (Note: Approved 1994.)
- Engagements: European Theater of Operations
- Decorations: Air Force Outstanding Unit Award

Insignia
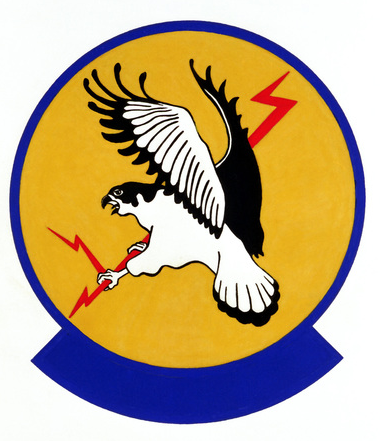
- 337th Flight Test Squadron emblem (Note: Approved 1 July 1982. Description: On a disc Or, bordered Azure, a falcon, volant, Argent and Sable, surmounting a large flash of lighting Gules.)

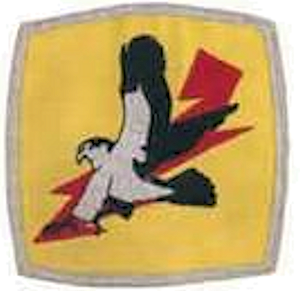
- Patch with 337th Fighter-Interceptor Squadron emblem (Note: Approved 9 June 1955. Description: On an Air Force yellow square shaped form, bordered silver, a falcon, volant, silver and black, surmounting a large flash of lightning red.)

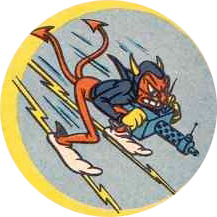
- 337th Fighter Squadron emblem

The 337th Flight Test Squadron was most recently part of the 46th Test Wing and based at McClellan Air Force Base, California. It performed depot acceptance testing until being inactivated with the closure of McClellan on 13 July 2001.

== History ==
=== World War II ===
Activated in 1942 at Keflavik, Iceland, equipped with Lockheed P-38 Lightnings. Mission was to intercept and destroy German planes that on occasion attempted to attack Iceland or that appeared in that area on reconnaissance missions. Returned to the United States in November 1942 as a IV Fighter Command Lightning Replacement Training Unit (RTU). Trained P-38 pilots in California and Washington State until phaseout of Lightning training in March 1944.

=== Air defense ===
Reactivated in 1953 as an Air Defense Command interceptor squadron. Performed air defense mission over Minneapolis and Upper Midwest United States, 1953–1955 with Northrop F-89D Scorpions. Reassigned to air defense of Boston and New England with North American F-86D Sabres. In 1957 began re-equipping with the North American F-86L Sabre, an improved version of the F-86D which incorporated the Semi Automatic Ground Environment, or SAGE computer-controlled direction system for intercepts. The service of the F-86L destined to be quite brief, since by the time the last F-86L conversion was delivered, the type was already being phased out in favor of supersonic interceptors.

Received new Lockheed F-104A Starfighter interceptor aircraft in early 1958, the third ADC squadron to receive the F-104. In addition, the squadron received the two-seat, dual-control, combat trainer F-104B. The performance of the F-104B was almost identical to that of the F-104A, but the lower internal fuel capacity reduced its effective range considerably. However, the F-104A was not very well suited for service as an interceptor. Its low range was a problem for North American air defense, and its lack of all-weather capability made it incapable of operating in conjunction with the SAGE (Semi-Automatic Ground Environment) system. Service with the ADC was consequently quite brief, and the F-104As of the 337th were transferred to the Air National Guard.

With the transfer of the Starfighters, ADC shut down operations at Westover Air Force Base and the 337th was inactivated in July 1960.

=== Tactical fighter operations ===
Reactivated as a McDonnell F-4 Phantom II tactical fighter squadron at Seymour Johnson Air Force Base in 1982–1985.

=== Flight test operations ===
The 2874th Test Squadron was activated as a flight test squadron as part of the Sacramento Air Logistics Center at McClellan Air Force Base, California in January 1988. It conducted flight tests on aircraft returning to active service after depot maintenance, modification, or repair. In 1992, the squadron was consolidated with the 337th Tactical Fighter Squadron as the 337th Test Squadron It was inactivated with the closure of McClellan.

== Lineage ==
337th Tactical Fighter Squadron

- Constituted as the 337th Fighter Squadron on 29 August 1942

Activated on 11 September 1942
Redesignated: 337th Fighter Squadron (Twin Engine) on 1 July 1942
Redesignated: 377th Fighter Squadron, Two Engine on 5 February 1944
Disbanded on 31 March 1944

- Reconstituted, and redesignated 337th Fighter-Interceptor Squadron, on 23 March 1953

Activated on 8 July 1954
Discontinued on 8 July 1960

- Redesignated 337th Tactical Fighter Squadron on 11 December 1981

Activated on 1 April 1982
Inactivated on 1 July 1985

- Consolidated with the 2874th Test Squadron as the 337th Test Squadron on 1 October 1992

337th Flight Test Squadron

- Designated as the 2874th Test Squadron and activated, on 15 January 1988
- Consolidated with the 337th Tactical Fighter Squadron as the 337th Test Squadron on 1 October 1992

Redesignated 337th Flight Test Squadron on 1 March 1994
Inactivated: 13 July 2001
337th Electronic Warfare Squadron
To be redesignated 337th Electronic Warfare Squadron on 11 May 2026

=== Assignments ===
- 342d Composite Group, 11 September 1942
- 329th Fighter Group, November 1942-31 March 1944
- 514th Air Defense Group, 8 July 1954
- 4707th Air Defense Wing, 18 August 1955
- 4622d Air Defense Wing (later, Boston Air Defense Sector), 18 October 1956
- 4729th Air Defense Group, 8 July 1957
- Boston Air Defense Sector, 25 June 1958 – 8 July 1960
- 4th Tactical Fighter Wing, 1 April 1982 – 1 July 1985
- Sacramento Air Logistics Center, 15 January 1988
- Air Force Development Test Center, 1 July 1994
- 46th Operations Group, 1 July 1994 – 13 July 2001
- 350th Spectrum Warfare Wing, 11 May 2026

=== Stations ===
- Keflavik, Iceland 11 September-26 November 1942
- Glendale Airport, California, 26 November 1942
- Muroc Army Air Base, California, 1 March 1943
- Glendale Airport, California, 6 May 1943
- Paine Field, Washington, 12 August 1943
- Glendale Airport, California, c. 2 November 1943
- Ontario Army Air Field, California, 29 December 1943 – 31 March 1944
- Minneapolis-St Paul International Airport, Minnesota, 8 July 1954
- Westover Air Force Base, Massachusetts, 18 August 1955 – 8 July 1960 (operated from Taoyuan Air Base, Taiwan, December 1958 – March 1959)
- Seymour Johnson Air Force Base, North Carolina, 1 April 1982 – 1 July 1985
- McClellan Air Force Base, California, 15 January 1988 – 13 July 2001
- Eglin AFB, FL 11 May 2026 -

=== Aircraft ===
- Lockheed P-38 Lightning, 1942–1944
- Northrop F-89D Scorpion, 1954–1955
- North American F-86D Sabre, 1955–1957
- North American F-86L Sabre, 1957–1958
- Lockheed F-104A Starfighter, 1958–1960
- McDonnell Douglas F-4E Phantom II, 1982–1985
- General Dynamics F-111 Aardvark

=== Commanders ===
- Lt Col Tad Oelstrom, 1982–1984
