= Foothill High School (Sacramento, California) =

Location
- 5000 McCloud Drive; Sacramento, California (Sacramento County) 95842; United States; 38.6797°N 121.3484°W

Information
- School type: Public
- Established: 1965
- School district: Twin Rivers Unified School District
- Principal: Tim Trokey
- Teaching staff: 64.71 (FTE)
- Grades: 9–12
- Enrollment: 1,417 (2024-2025)
- Student to teacher ratio: 21.90
- Campus size: 162,071 sq ft (15,056.9 m^{2})
- Colors: Orange, Black, and White
- Sports: Yes
- Mascot: Mustang
- Nickname: Mustangs
- Rivals: Rio Linda High School
- Newspaper: fhspress.com
- Yearbook: EQUI
- Website: fhs.trusd.net

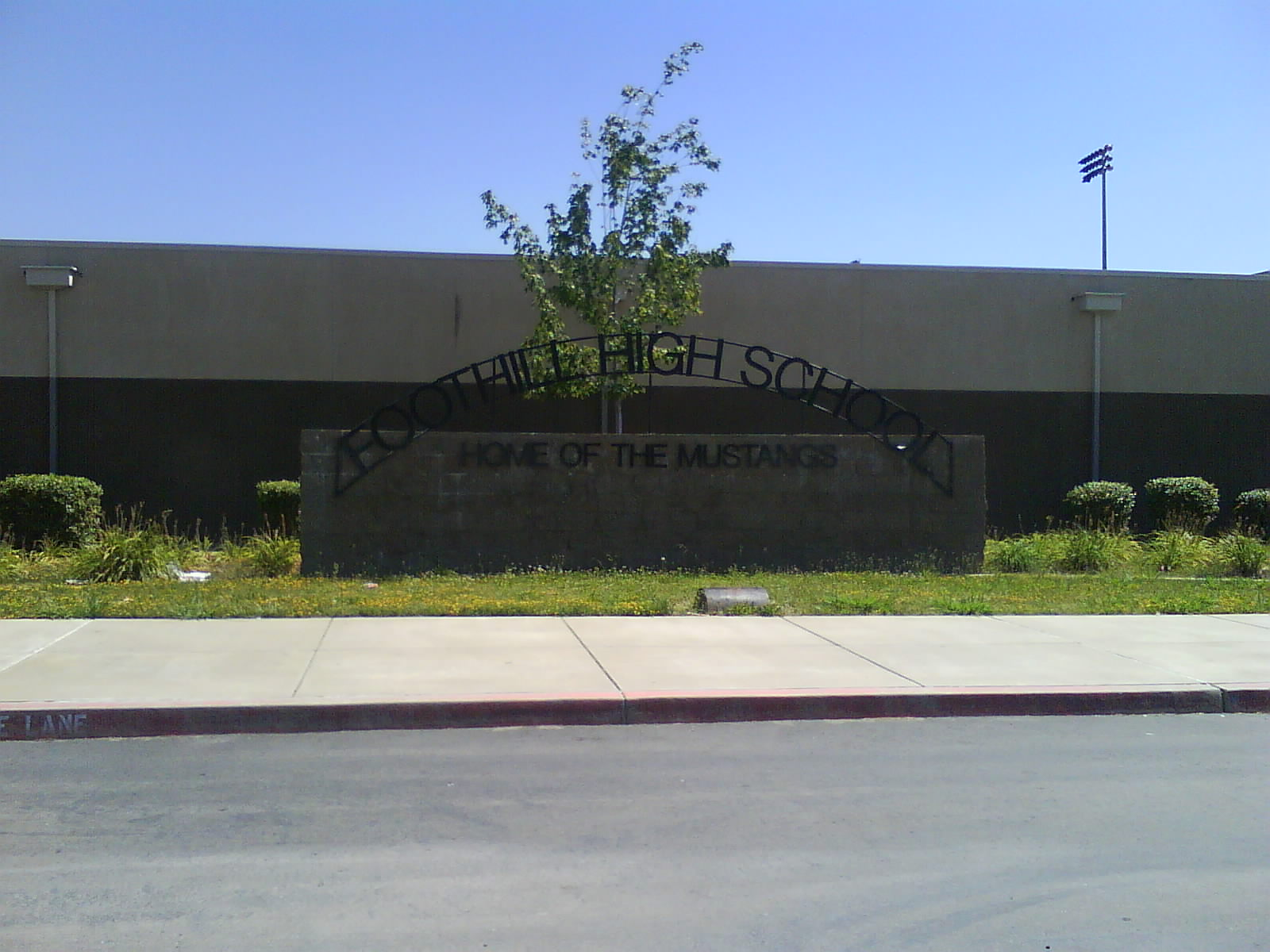
Foothill HS Sacramento.JPG

Foothill High School is a four-year high school located in Foothill Farms, California, a middle-class suburb of Sacramento, California. It is part of the Twin Rivers Unified School District.

== Administration ==
- Principal: Tim Trokey

== Demographics ==
For the 2023–2024 school year, there was a total of 1,289 students enrolled at Foothill High. The school's demographic make-up is very diverse: 18.5% White, 43.8% Hispanic/Latino, 14.3% African-American, 11.1% Asian/Pacific Islander, and 6.4% of two or more races. Regarding economically disadvantaged students, 83% of the students are eligible to participate in the Free Lunch Program under the National School Lunch Act, and 8% of the students are eligible for the Reduced-Price Lunch Program under the National School Lunch Act. The three primary languages spoken by English language learners are Spanish, Persian, and Pashto.

== Boys Basketball ==
Foothill High School's boys basketball team has recently become one of the best in Sacramento, notably being the only school in Sacramento to have won two state championships (in 1994 and 2003, under head coach Drew Hibbs, The Sacramento Bee's Coach of the Decade). The boys basketball team has also won four section championships in 1997, 2003, 2004, and 2012.

== Notable alumni ==
- Devante Bond, professional football player.
- Michael Bryson, professional basketball player.
- Curt DiGiacomo, professional football player.
- Larry Grant, professional football player.
- Khalil Kain, actor.
- Bob Otto, professional football player.
- David Tangipa, politician.
- Kevin Thomas, professional football player.

== Twin Rivers Unified School District ==
The Twin Rivers Unified School District was created as a result of the November 2007 approval of Measure B, a proposal to merge the four North Sacramento (California) area school districts: the North Sacramento School District, the Del Paso Heights School District, the Rio Linda Union School District, and the Grant Joint Union High School District. Originally referred to as New North Area Unified School District after Measure B passed, the name Twin Rivers was selected from among 300 submitted by community members during a three-week naming contest. Twin Rivers USD has also hosted a series of community forums to obtain feedback and input from parents, classified staff, teachers, and community members. The district office is located at 5115 Dudley Boulevard. McClellan, California.
