= Sacramento McClellan Airport =

Airport in California, US

Coordinates: 38°40′04″N 121°24′02″W

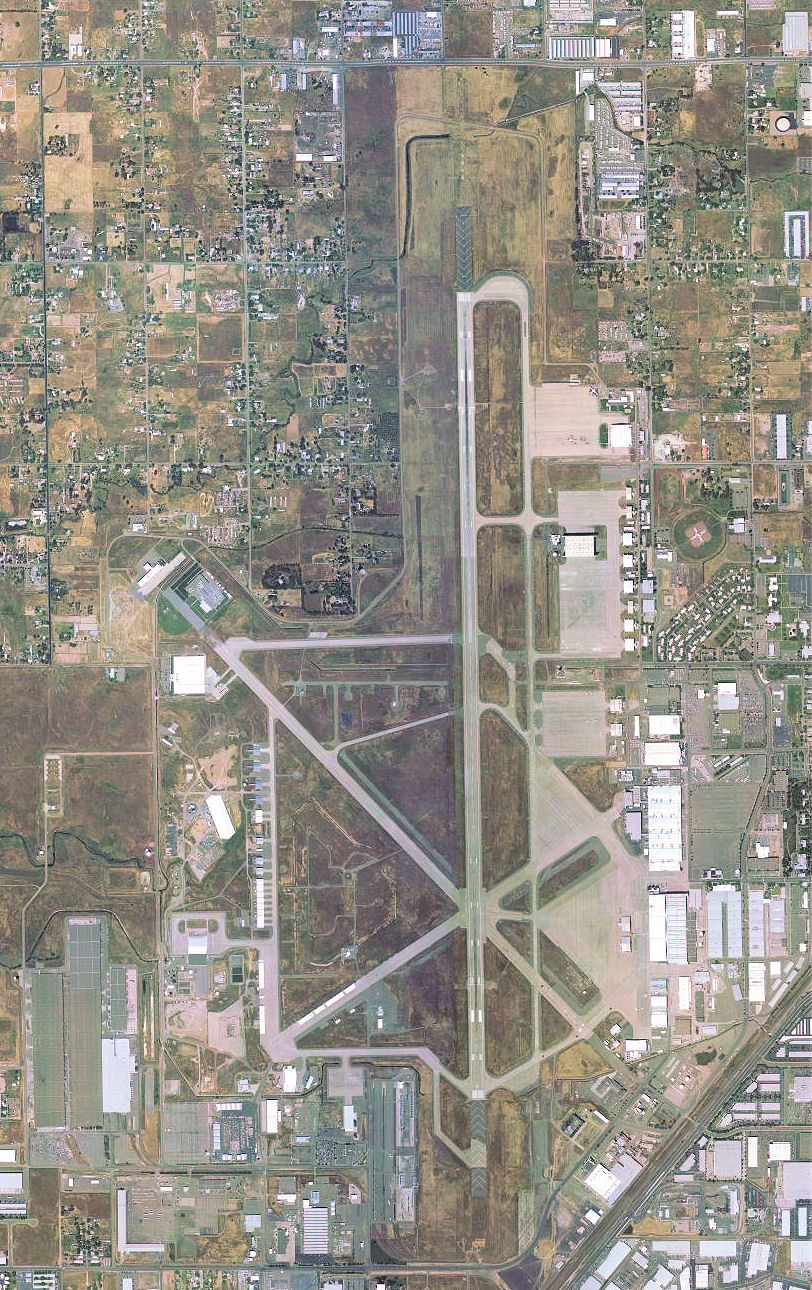
- IATA: MCC; ICAO: KMCC; FAA LID: MCC

Summary
- Airport type: Private
- Owner: McClellan Park
- Operator: McClellan Jet Services
- Serves: Sacramento, California
- Elevation AMSL: 77 ft / 23 m
- Website: flykmcc.com
- Interactive map of Sacramento McClellan Airport

Runways
Direction	Length		Surface
Direction	ft	m	Surface
16/34	10,599	3,231	Concrete

Helipads
Number	Length		Surface
Number	ft	m	Surface
H1	57	17	Concrete
H2	57	17	Concrete
H3	57	17	Concrete
H4	57	17	Concrete

Statistics (2004)
- Aircraft operations: 10,000
- Based aircraft: 84
- Source: Federal Aviation Administration

Sacramento McClellan Airport (IATA: MCC, ICAO: KMCC, FAA LID: MCC) is a privately owned, public-use airport located in the unincorporated area of McClellan Park, California, six miles (9.7 km; 5.2 nmi) northeast of the central business district of Sacramento, the California state capital.

The airport is on the former site of McClellan Air Force Base, which existed as a military base from 1939 to 2000. It was transferred to Sacramento County in 2000, as part of its conversion into McClellan Business Park, and was purchased by McClellan Business Park in October 2017. The airport is a public-use facility which operates as a controlled airfield with a contract control tower. The airport is mainly used for general aviation and a fire tanker base. Current airport tenants include CAL FIRE, Calstar, Coast Guard Air Station Sacramento, Dassault Falcon, United States Forest Service, PODS, and the Sacramento Metropolitan Fire District. All ground handling and fueling is completed by McClellan Jet Services, a subsidiary of McClellan Business Park.

== History ==
The air force base was established in 1935. It was named after Major Hezekiah McClellan on 1 December 1939, a pioneer in arctic aeronautical tests. Born in 1894, he died on 25 May 1936 when his Consolidated P-30 which he was flight testing, crashed near Centerville, Ohio.

Construction of the Pacific Air Depot began in 1935, and the main structures, including administrative buildings, barracks, warehouses and a hospital were completed on 18 April 1938. In 1938 the base was renamed Sacramento Air Depot and underwent a major expansion as a repair and overhaul facility for P-38 and P-39 fighter planes.

In December 1941, soon after the attack on Pearl Harbor, P-40s as well as Martin B-26 Marauder and Boeing B-17 Flying Fortress bombers began arriving at the field to be armed and prepared for immediate shipment overseas. In March 1942 Lieutenant Colonel Jimmy Doolittle's B-25s arrived at McClellan for arming in preparation for their famous Tokyo raid.

On January 3, 1944 a B-17 Flying Fortress slammed into the runway while trying to land, killing all but one of its crew and scattering wreckage over a 15-mile area.

The base was renamed McClellan Air Force Base in 1948 and its repair and overhaul mission continued throughout the Cold War as an installation of the Air Force Logistics Command (AFLC) and later the Air Force Materiel Command (AFMC), with the overhaul facility being known as the Sacramento Air Logistics Center.

Throughout the 1980s and early 1990s, McClellan functioned as the main depot for overhauling the Air Force's F-111, FB-111 and EF-111 aircraft, as well as the Fairchild A-10 Thunderbolt II aircraft. A small contingent of F-111D and F-111F aircraft of the 431st Test and Evaluation Squadron, 57th Fighter Weapons Wing, Nellis AFB, Nevada was also detached to McClellan.

== Facilities and aircraft ==
McClellan Airfield has one concrete paved runway (16/34) measuring 10,600 x 150 ft. (3,231 x 46 m). It also has four concrete helipads, all measuring 57 x 57 ft. (17 x 17 m). For the 12-month period ending April 10, 2004, the airport had 10,000 aircraft operations, an average of 27 per day: 40% military, 40% air taxi and 20% general aviation. There are 84 aircraft based at this airport: 4% single-engine, 64% multi-engine, 23% jet and 5% helicopter and 5% military.

The Aerospace Museum of California occupies a site at the north of the airfield.

== Coast Guard Air Station ==
The airport also functioned as a joint civil-military facility, providing a base for the United States Coast Guard and its Coast Guard Air Station Sacramento facility. Missions include search and rescue (SAR), law enforcement, aids to navigation support (such as operating lighthouses) and various military operations. In addition, Coast Guard helicopters assigned to the air station deploy to Coast Guard cutters.
