= Ken Ackerman (radio announcer) =

Ken Ackerman (1922 – May 28, 2017) was an American radio announcer, disc jockey, and news anchor.

== Career ==
Ackerman, who grew up in Rio Linda, California, began announcing as a student at Grant Union High School. After a brief stint at KFBK in Sacramento, he joined KCBS (then KQW), San Francisco, in 1942. One of his trademark introductions was for live bands playing on Friday and Saturday Nights from the Palace Hotel, where the KCBS studios were located until 1971: "... live and direct for your listening pleasure from the Rose Room at San Francisco’s famous Palace Hotel."

In 1958, Ackerman replaced Dave McElhatton (who had moved to a morning show) as the host of "Music 'til Dawn", a show sponsored by American Airlines that aired from 11:30 p.m. until 5:30 a.m. and which featured easy-listening and light classics. Ackerman hosted the show until it was canceled by CBS in 1970.

When KCBS went from an easy-listening to news format in 1968, Ackerman made the transition to news anchor after his show was canceled. He retired in 1982 and continued in a part-time role until the station released him in 1995.

== Other accomplishments and honors ==
Alfred Hitchcock, who had a home in the Santa Cruz Mountains, and who admitted that he often listened to Ackerman's show late at night, cast Ackerman as the radio announcer in The Birds.

Ackerman was one of the founders of the Broadcast Legends social group in 1992.

He was inducted into the first class of the Bay Area Radio Hall of Fame in 2006.

Ackerman donated many of the tapes of his broadcasts to various organizations. Most of these can be found in the Stanford University Library, and many can be heard online at the California Historical Radio Society and the Bay Area Radio Museum websites.

== Death ==
Ackerman died at his home on May 28, 2017 of natural causes. He is survived by two daughters, Barbara Karp and Marie Ackerman.
