= Bob Otto =

American football player (born 1962)

No. 76, 67
- Position: Defensive end

Personal information
- Born: December 16, 1962 (age 63); Sacramento, California, U.S.
- Listed height: 6 ft 6 in (1.98 m)
- Listed weight: 251 lb (114 kg)

Career information
- High school: Foothill (Sacramento)
- College: Idaho State
- NFL draft: 1985: 9th round, 248th overall pick

Career history
- Seattle Seahawks (1985)*; Dallas Cowboys (1986); Seattle Seahawks (1987)*; Houston Oilers (1987)
- * Offseason or practice squad member only

Awards and highlights
- Second-team All-Big Sky (1985)

Career NFL statistics
- Games played: 7
- Stats at Pro Football Reference

Robert E. Otto (born December 12, 1962) is an American former professional football player who was a defensive end in the National Football League (NFL) for the Dallas Cowboys and Houston Oilers. He played college football for the Idaho State Bengals.

== Early life ==
Otto attended Foothill High School, where he played tight end. He accepted a football scholarship from Idaho State University, where he was converted into a defensive end. He started a few games as a sophomore. He became a regular starter as a junior.

He registered 45 tackles (6 for loss) as a senior. He finished his college career with 145 tackles (21 for loss).

== Professional career ==
Otto was selected by the Seattle Seahawks in the ninth round (248th overall) of the 1985 NFL draft.

In 1986, he signed as a free agent with the Dallas Cowboys. He was released on September 1, 1986. He was signed on September 23, to replace defensive end Jesse Baker. He wasn't re-signed after the season.

On April 3, 1987, he signed as a free agent by the Seahawks. He was placed on the injured reserve list on September 1, before being cut later in September.

In September 1987, he signed as a free agent with the Houston Oilers. He was released on October 27.
