= Grant Joint Union High School District =

School district in California

Grant Joint Union High School District was a high school district located in northern Sacramento County. It was considered an urban-suburban school district, serving, at its peak, approximately 12,000 students in grades 7 – 12. The district had nine comprehensive school sites—five junior high schools and four high schools.

On November 6, 2007, Measure B was passed by voters to merge the Grant Joint Union High School district with the local elementary school districts, including Rio Linda, North Sacramento and Del Paso Heights. On July 1, 2008, they formed the Twin Rivers Unified School District that now serves about a total of 30,000 students.

== History ==
The dream of creating a new district to serve the students in the territory north of the American River began in 1931, when voters approved plans for the district with an overwhelming 750–25 vote. A bond, promoted through door-to-door canvassing by a citizen named William Rutherford, was passed by the taxpayers and the Grant Joint Union High School District was formed. The first classes were held in the Hotel North Sacramento at the corner of Del Paso Boulevard and Arden.

The enduring "can-do" spirit of Grant District and North Area neighborhoods has created educational programs, facilities and community resources that have continued to serve students families and communities, from building an Olympic-size community swimming pool in 1934, to starting the nation's first school-run radio program in 1940, to establishing a resident school for Aeronautical Training (Grant Tech), which later became American River College.

=== Milestones ===
1931 – The district name "Grant" is chosen in honor of the Ben Ali Haggin land grant, at a time when the famous racing stables were located in the area.

1932 – Grant Union High School opens, adopting the team name "Pacers" in honor of the horse-racing heritage of the area.

1939 – The Grant Wurlitzer organ is heard on-air for the first time, played by Grant alumnus George Wright, who will go on to become the most famous theatre organist of the modern era.

1955 - Norte Del Rio High School opens.

1958 – Highlands High School opens.

1962 – Rio Linda High School opens.

1965 – Foothill High School opens.

1969 – Grant Special Education Center opens.

1980 - Pacific Career and Technology High School (Continuation), formerly Aero Haven High School (Continuation), opens.

1994 - Foothill High School's boys' basketball Team wins the Boys' Basketball State Championship.

2002 - Vista Nueva Career and Technology High School (Continuation), formerly Pacific West High School, opens.

2002 – Grant Union High School's Criminal Justice Academy wins a Golden Bell Award from the California School Boards Association, in the School to Career category.

2003 – Grant District teacher Virginia Avila is named one of the California Teachers of the Year and goes on to represent the state in the 2003 National Teacher of the Year competition.

2003 - Foothill High School wins its second Boys' Basketball State Championship.

2004 – The new Foothill High School stadium opens.

2005 – Grant District Superintendent Dr. Larry Buchanan is named California's Superintendent of the Year by the Association of California School Administrators.

2006 – The Rio Linda High School Aquatic Complex opens.

2007 - Measure B passes, merging Grant with Rio Linda, North Sacramento and Del Paso Heights school districts to form the Twin Rivers Unified School District.

== Notable students and staff ==
- Sean Chambers - Highlands High School Class of 1983; current Antelope High School basketball coach; Alaska Aces (PBA) star player
- Grantland Johnson - Grant Union High School graduate; former California Secretary of Health and Human Services
- George Wright - Grant Union High School graduate; organist
