= Elverta, California =

Elverta
- Census-designated place
- Position in California.
- Coordinates: 38°42′50″N 121°27′46″W
- Country: United States
- State: California
- County: Sacramento

Area
  - Total: 8.842 sq mi (22.90 km^{2})
  - Land: 8.842 sq mi (22.90 km^{2})
  - Water: 0 sq mi (0 km^{2}) 0%
- Elevation: 52 ft (16 m)

Population (April 1, 2020)
  - Total: 5,435
  - Density: 614.7/sq mi (237.3/km^{2})
- Time zone: UTC-8 (Pacific)
  - Summer (DST): UTC-7 (PDT)
- ZIP code: 95626
- Area code: 916, 279
- FIPS code: 06-22524
- GNIS ID: 1658496

Elverta is a census-designated place in Sacramento County, California, United States. It is part of the Sacramento metropolitan area, which includes Sacramento (the state capital and county seat), Arden-Arcade, and Roseville. It is approximately 20 miles (32 km) from Sacramento, 2.5 miles (4.0 km) from Rio Linda, 6 miles (9.7 km) from Roseville, and 8.0 miles (12.9 km) from Antelope. The population was 5,435 as of the 2020 census.

The ZIP code is 95626, which it shares with other areas of Sacramento County as well as parts of Placer and Sutter counties.

The community has very few hills, and no major bodies of water.

== History ==
The unincorporated community was named for Elverta Dike, whose husband donated property to a local church. The Elverta/Rio Linda community is located on part of the Rancho Del Paso Mexican land grant of 1844. In 1910, a Fruit Land Company of Minneapolis acquired 12,000 acres (49 km^{2}) of the Grant and in 1912 the area was subdivided. It also runs to the Rio Linda Bike Path.

== Geography ==
Elverta is located at 38°42′50″N 121°27′46″W (38.7137910, -121.4627326).

According to the United States Census Bureau, the unincorporated community has a total area of 8.842 square miles (22.90 km^{2}), all land.

=== Climate ===
According to the Köppen Climate Classification system, Elverta has a warm-summer Mediterranean climate, abbreviated "Csa" on climate maps.

== Demographics ==
Historical population
Census	Pop.	Note	%±
2010	5,492		—
2020	5,435		−1.0%
U.S. Decennial Census; 1850–1870 1880-1890; 1900 1910 1920; 1930 1940 1950; 1960 1970 1980; 1990 2000 2010

Elverta first appeared as a census designated place in the 2010 U.S. census.

=== 2020 census ===
As of the 2020 census, Elverta had a population of 5,435. The population density was 614.7 inhabitants per square mile (237.3/km^{2}). The median age was 42.3 years. 21.1% of residents were under the age of 18, 7.8% were aged 18 to 24, 24.1% were aged 25 to 44, 28.9% were aged 45 to 64, and 18.1% were 65 years of age or older. For every 100 females there were 101.7 males, and for every 100 females age 18 and over there were 98.0 males age 18 and over.

The census reported that 99.5% of the population lived in households, 0.5% lived in non-institutionalized group quarters, and no one was institutionalized. 66.5% of residents lived in urban areas, while 33.5% lived in rural areas.

There were 1,822 households, of which 30.0% had children under the age of 18 living in them. Of all households, 55.2% were married-couple households, 6.6% were cohabiting couple households, 17.4% were households with a male householder and no spouse or partner present, and 20.8% were households with a female householder and no spouse or partner present. About 18.8% of all households were made up of individuals and 9.6% had someone living alone who was 65 years of age or older. The average household size was 2.97. There were 1,361 families (74.7% of all households).

There were 1,869 housing units at an average density of 211.4 units per square mile (81.6 units/km^{2}). Of all housing units, 97.5% were occupied and 2.5% were vacant. Of occupied units, 82.7% were owner-occupied and 17.3% were occupied by renters. The homeowner vacancy rate was 0.9% and the rental vacancy rate was 1.3%.

Racial composition as of the 2020 census
Race	Number	Percent
White	3,758	69.1%
Black or African American	109	2.0%
American Indian and Alaska Native	84	1.5%
Asian	261	4.8%
Native Hawaiian and Other Pacific Islander	28	0.5%
Some other race	504	9.3%
Two or more races	691	12.7%
Hispanic or Latino (of any race)	1,090	20.1%

=== Income and poverty ===
In 2023, the US Census Bureau estimated that the median household income was $91,563, and the per capita income was $38,554. About 7.3% of families and 10.1% of the population were below the poverty line.

=== 2010 census ===
The 2010 United States census reported that Elverta had a population of 5,492. The population density was 621.1 inhabitants per square mile (239.8/km^{2}). The racial makeup of Elverta was 4,453 (81.1%) White, 117 (2.1%) African American, 77 (1.4%) Native American, 208 (3.8%) Asian, 48 (0.9%) Pacific Islander, 302 (5.5%) from other races, and 287 (5.2%) from two or more races. Hispanic or Latino of any race were 859 persons (15.6%).

The Census reported that 5,486 people (99.9% of the population) lived in households, 6 (0.1%) lived in non-institutionalized group quarters, and 0 (0%) were institutionalized.

There were 1,741 households, out of which 688 (39.5%) had children under the age of 18 living in them, 1,035 (59.4%) were opposite-sex married couples living together, 219 (12.6%) had a female householder with no husband present, 123 (7.1%) had a male householder with no wife present. There were 106 (6.1%) unmarried opposite-sex partnerships, and 23 (1.3%) same-sex married couples or partnerships. 259 households (14.9%) were made up of individuals, and 83 (4.8%) had someone living alone who was 65 years of age or older. The average household size was 3.15. There were 1,377 families (79.1% of all households); the average family size was 3.48.

The population was spread out, with 1,387 people (25.3%) under the age of 18, 554 people (10.1%) aged 18 to 24, 1,240 people (22.6%) aged 25 to 44, 1,728 people (31.5%) aged 45 to 64, and 583 people (10.6%) who were 65 years of age or older. The median age was 38.6 years. For every 100 females, there were 101.0 males. For every 100 females age 18 and over, there were 97.8 males.

There were 1,839 housing units at an average density of 208.0 per square mile (80.3/km^{2}), of which 1,389 (79.8%) were owner-occupied, and 352 (20.2%) were occupied by renters. The homeowner vacancy rate was 2.3%; the rental vacancy rate was 3.6%. 4,317 people (78.6% of the population) lived in owner-occupied housing units and 1,169 people (21.3%) lived in rental housing units.

== Education ==
The western half of the census-designated place is within the Elverta Joint Elementary School District, which includes portions of Sacramento, and Placer counties. The district is a California school district. It includes Elverta Elementary School, an elementary school serving kindergarten through fifth grade, and Alpha Technology Middle School, a middle school serving sixth through eighth grades.

As of 2020 Elverta JESD students are, for high school, assigned to Twin Rivers Unified School District.

Residents of the eastern half of the CDP are zoned to Center Joint Unified School District.

== Government and infrastructure ==
Elverta is represented by Phil Serna, the District 1 representative on the Sacramento County Board of Supervisors. The United States Postal Service Elverta post office is located at 161 West Elverta Road.

== See also ==
- Sacramento Valley
- Rio Linda, California
