= Rio Linda High School =

Public high school in Rio Linda, California

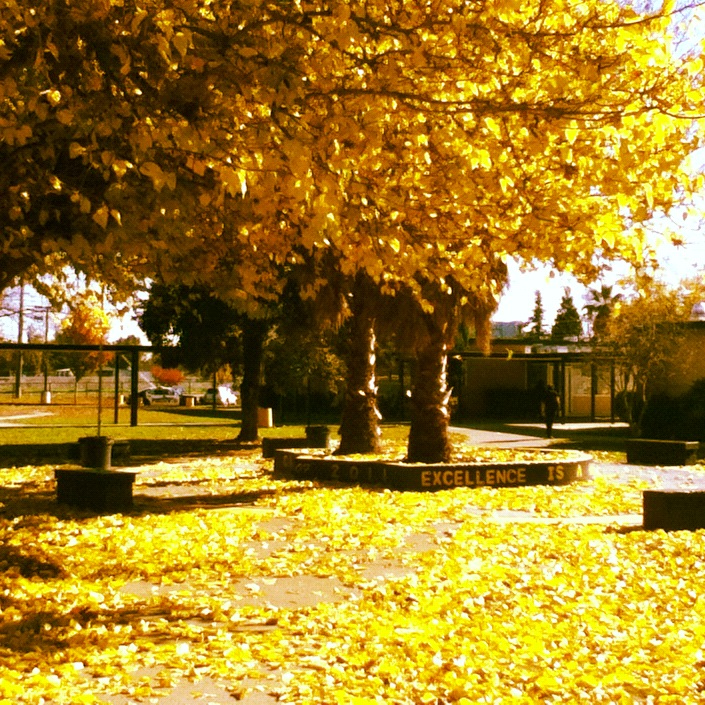

Location
- 6309 Dry Creek Road; Rio Linda, California 95673; United States; 38.682243°N 121.438515°W

Information
- Type: Public 4-year
- Motto: Excellence is a Habit
- Established: 1962
- School district: Twin Rivers Unified School District
- Principal: Diedre Barlow
- Teaching staff: 78.15 (FTE)
- Grades: 9-12
- Enrollment: 1,594 (2024-2025)
- Student to teacher ratio: 20.40
- Colors: Black and gold
- Nickname: Knights
- Newspaper: Knight Times
- Website: rlhs.trusd.net

Rio Linda High School is a high school located in Rio Linda, Sacramento, California, United States. It has an enrollment of 1,794 students. It is part of the Twin Rivers Unified School District, and was formerly part of the Grant Unified School District.

Rio Linda High School opened in 1962 and has been one of the primary high schools for students in the Rio Linda/Elverta and Natomas Communities. It offers a wide range of extracurricular activities and academic opportunities.

== Demographics ==
In the 2024-2025 school year, 1,594 students attend Rio Linda High School. 19% of them are White, 51% are Hispanic, 15% are Asian, and 7% are African-American. 83% of the students receive a reduced price/free lunch.

== Rankings ==
In 2012, after evaluating 21,776 high schools across the nation, U.S. News & World Report awarded Rio Linda High School a silver medal. Rio Linda was ranked 1,605th nationally (top 8%) and 337th within the state of California (top 14%)

== Notable alumni ==
- Jay Mosley, member of the Missouri House of Representatives
- Darren Oliver, Major League Baseball player
- Sheila Hudson, Olympian, USATF Board of Director & Hall of Fame, Cal State Los Angeles Golden Eagles Sr Athletics Executive, USTFCCCA Hall of Fame
- Justin E. H. Smith, philosopher and author
- Kay Ivey, the current governor of Alabama, taught at the school in the 1960s
- Cam Skattebo, running back for the New York Giants
