= 4729th Air Defense Group =

Discontinued US Air Force organization

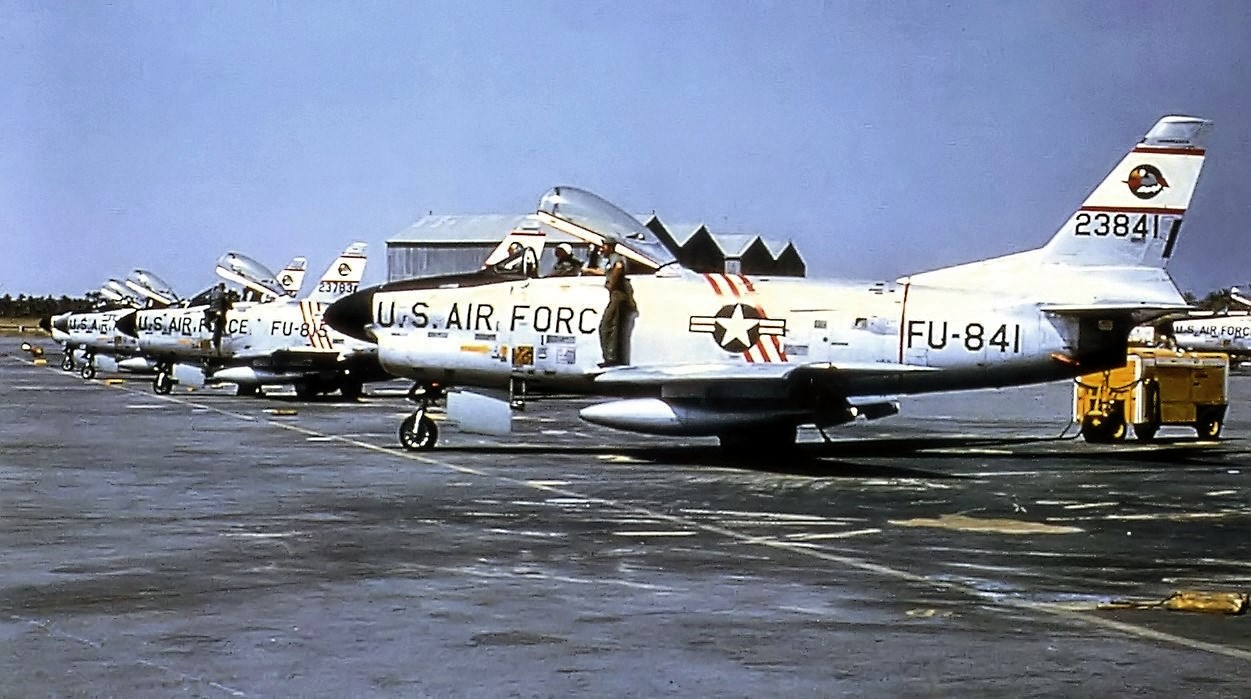
- 324th FIS F-86D Sabres at Westover AFB (Note: Aircraft in front is North American F-86D-40-NA Sabre, serial 52-3841. This plane was struck of charge at Sidi Slimane Air Base, Morocco on 16 February 1960. Dirkx, Marco (23 September 2025). "1952 USAF Serial Numbers". Joe Baugher’s Serial Number List..)
- Active: 1957–1958
- Country: United States
- Branch: United States Air Force
- Type: Fighter interceptor
- Role: Air defense

The 4729th Air Defense Group is a discontinued United States Air Force organization. Its last assignment was with the Boston Air Defense Sector at Westover Air Force Base, Massachusetts, where it was discontinued in 1958.

The group was formed to provide a single command and support organization for the two fighter interceptor squadrons of Air Defense Command, that were tenants at Westover, a Strategic Air Command (SAC) base. It was also assigned a maintenance squadron to perform aircraft maintenance. It was discontinued after the 324th Fighter-Interceptor Squadron moved in 1958, leaving only a single fighter squadron at Westover.

== History ==
The 4729th Air Defense Group was established to provide a headquarters for the two Air Defense Command (ADC) fighter-interceptor squadrons stationed at Westover Air Force Base, Massachusetts, a Strategic Air Command (SAC) base. SAC's 814th Air Base Group acted as host organization for the base.

The group was assigned the 324th and 337th Fighter-Interceptor Squadrons, flying radar equipped and Folding-Fin Aerial Rocket armed North American F-86D Sabre aircraft as its operational components, to provide air defense of New England. These squadrons were already stationed at Westover and had been assigned to the Boston Air Defense Sector. In August, maintenance for the two fighter squadrons was combined in the 603rd Consolidated Aircraft Maintenance Squadron (CAMS), which was activated at Westover. The 324th and 337th upgraded to newer model F-86L Sabres with data link for interception control through the Semi-Automatic Ground Environment system in the fall of 1957. In the spring of 1958, the 337th converted to Lockheed F-104 Starfighter aircraft.

The group was discontinued when the 324th departed for Morocco, leaving only a single operational ADC squadron at Westover. The 603rd CAMS was also inactivated, while the 337th was then assigned directly to the Boston Air Defense Sector.

== Lineage ==
- Designated and organized as: 4729th Air Defense Group on 8 July 1957

Discontinued on 25 June 1958

=== Assignments ===
- Boston Air Defense Sector, 8 July 1957 – 25 June 1958

=== Stations ===
- Westover Air Force Base, Massachusetts, 8 July 1957 – 25 June 1958

=== Components ===
- 324th Fighter-Interceptor Squadron, 8 July 1957 – 25 June 1958
- 337th Fighter-Interceptor Squadron, 8 July 1957 – 25 June 1958
- 603rd Consolidated Aircraft Maintenance Squadron, 8 August 1957 – 8 February 1958

=== Aircraft ===
- North American F-86D Sabre 1957
- North American F-86L Sabre 1957–1958
- Lockheed F-104A Starfighter 1958

== See also ==
- List of Lockheed F-104 Starfighter operators
- List of Sabre and Fury units in the US military
- List of United States Air Force Aerospace Defense Command Interceptor Squadrons
