= Curt DiGiacomo =

American professional football player (born 1963)

No. 75, 65
- Positions: Guard, center

Personal information
- Born: October 24, 1963 (age 63); San Diego, California, U.S.
- Listed height: 6 ft 4 in (1.93 m)
- Listed weight: 270 lb (122 kg)

Career information
- High school: Sacramento (CA) Foothill
- College: Arizona
- NFL draft: 1986: undrafted

Career history
- San Diego Chargers (1986–1987); Kansas City Chiefs (1988); Los Angeles Raiders (1989)*; Houston Oilers (1990)*
- * Offseason or practice squad member only
- Stats at Pro Football Reference

Curt DiGiacomo (born October 24, 1963) is an American former professional football player who was a guard and center in the National Football League (NFL). He played college football for the Arizona Wildcats. He played in the NFL for the San Diego Chargers in 1986 and Kansas City Chiefs in 1988.
