= Elverta Joint Elementary School District =

School district in California, United States

Address
- 7900 Eloise Avenue Elverta, California, 95626; United States

District information
- Type: Public
- Grades: K–8
- Superintendent: Patricia Newsome
- Schools: 2
- NCES District ID: 0612600

Students and staff
- Students: 223 (2023–2024)
- Teachers: 9.94 ((on an FTE basis))
- Staff: 21.63 ((on an FTE basis))
- Student–teacher ratio: 22.43

Other information
- Website: www.ejesd.net

Elverta Joint Elementary School District (EJESD) is a public school district based in Sacramento County, California, United States. It has two schools: Alpha Technology Middle School and Elverta Elementary School.

The district is mostly in Sacramento County, with a portion in Placer County.

The district includes the western portion of the Elverta census-designated place. Residents in grades 9-12 are zoned to Twin Rivers Unified School District.
