= Sacramento Air Logistics Center =

Former air depot of the US Air Force in Sacramento

Coordinates: 38.6590°N 121.3919°W

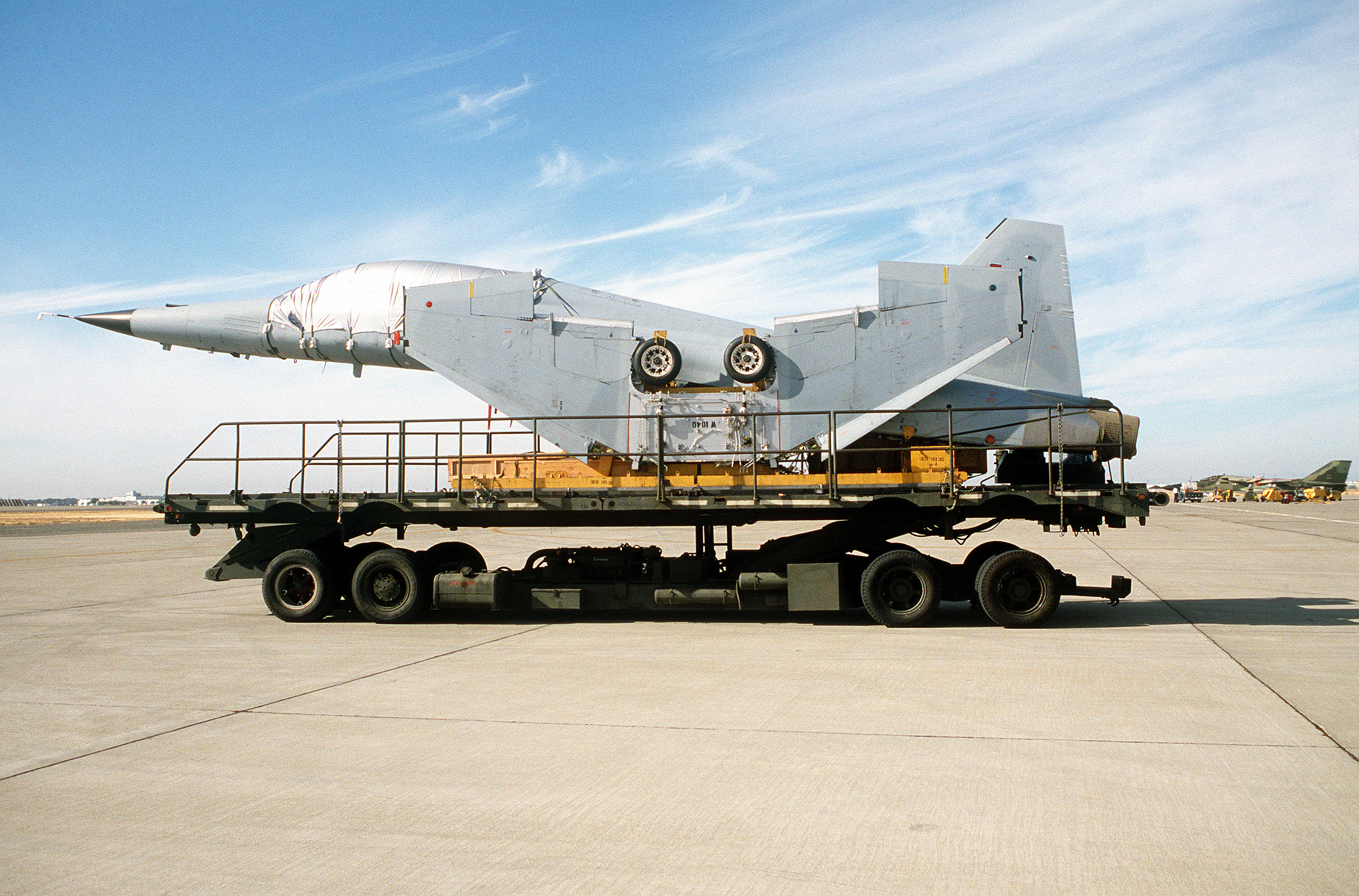
- An Northrop F-5 Tiger prepared for shipment to the Jordanian Air Force after modification by the Sacramento Air Materiel Area
- Active: 1943–2001
- Country: United States
- Branch: United States Air Force
- Role: Maintenance and supply support

Insignia
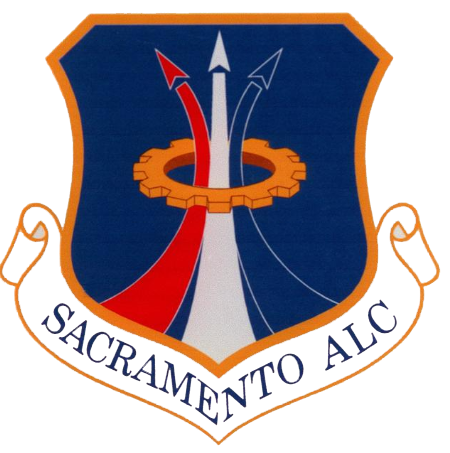
- Sacramento Air Logistics Center emblem

The Sacramento Air Logistics Center is a former United States Air Force unit based at McClellan Air Force Base from 1935 until its closure as part of the 1995 Base Realignment and Closure Commission.

== History ==
Construction of the Pacific Air Depot began in 1935, and the main structures, including administrative buildings, barracks, warehouses and a hospital were completed on 18 April 1938. It was one of only four such air depots in the country. In 1938 the base was renamed Sacramento Air Depot and underwent a major expansion as a repair and overhaul facility for Lockheed P-38 Lightning and Bell P-39 Airacobra fighter planes. The planes were serviced on an assembly line basis. In 1940, an assembly line was added to overhaul Curtiss P-40 Warhawk fighters.

In December 1941, soon after the attack on Pearl Harbor, P-40s as well as Martin B-26 Marauder and Boeing B-17 Flying Fortress bombers began arriving at the field to be armed and prepared for immediate shipment overseas. Some B-17s came direct to McClellan Field from the factories. During this time most of the Army Air Forces planes that went to the Pacific Theater were prepared at McClellan. In March 1942, Lieutenant Colonel Jimmy Doolittle's B-25s arrived at McClellan for arming in preparation for their famous Tokyo raid. The Doolittle Raiders practiced their aircraft carrier takeoff techniques at the Willows Airport in Glenn County, about 90 miles north on U.S. Route 99. The airport runway was painted to represent the flight deck of the aircraft carrier USS Hornet.

In 1943, the center was formed as the Sacramento Air Depot Control Area Command to control not only the Sacramento Air Depot, but other depots and sub-depots in the central Pacific area. During World War II, numerous planes arrived at McClellan from all over the U.S. to be armed and otherwise prepared for shipment overseas to combat areas. After the war McClellan became a storage center of several types of aircraft including Boeing B-29 Superfortress bombers.

The base was renamed McClellan Air Force Base in 1948 and its repair and overhaul mission continued throughout the Cold War as an installation of the Air Force Logistics Command and later the Air Force Materiel Command, with the overhaul facility being known as the Sacramento Air Logistics Center.

The center had the 2874th Test Squadron assigned to it from 15 January 1988 – 30 September 1992. It conducted flight tests on aircraft returning to active service after depot maintenance, modification, or repair. In 1992, the squadron was consolidated with the 337th Tactical Fighter Squadron as the 337th Test Squadron. It was inactivated with the closure of McClellan AFB.

Throughout the 1980s and early 1990s, McClellan functioned as the main depot for overhauling the Air Force's General Dynamics F-111, FB-111 and EF-111 aircraft, as well as the Fairchild Republic A-10 Thunderbolt II aircraft. It also hosted a tenant Boeing WC-135 unit and supported the sophisticated electronic Operation Red Flag at Nellis Air Force Base Nevada. A small contingent of General Dynamics F-111D and F-111F aircraft of the 431st Test and Evaluation Squadron of the 57th Fighter Weapons Wing at Nellis was also detached to McClellan.

== Lineage ==
- Constituted as the Sacramento Air Depot Control Area Command on 19 January 1943

Activated on 1 February 1943
Redesignated Sacramento Air Service Command on 22 May 1943
Redesignated Sacramento Army Air Forces Technical Service Command on 14 November 1944
Redesignated Sacramento Air Technical Service Command on 1 July 1945
Redesignated Sacramento Air Materiel Area on 2 July 1946
Redesignated Sacramento Air Logistics Center on 1 April 1974
Inactivated on 13 July 2001

=== Assignments ===
- Air Service Command, 1 February 1943
- Army Air Forces Materiel & Services (later Army Air Forces Technical Service Command, Air Technical Service Command, Air Materiel Command, Air Force Logistics Command), 17 July 1944
- Air Force Materiel Command, 1 July 1992 – 13 July 2001

=== Components ===
Depots

- AAF Storage Depot, Alameda (later 22d AAF Storage Depot, 800th AAF Specialized Storage Depot), 15 March 1943 – 1 July 1945
- Sacramento Air Depot, 1 February 1943 – 3 January 1955
- 840th AAF Specialized Storage Depot, 20 September 1943 – 15 March 1947
- 853rd AAF Specialized Storage Depot, 1 February 1944 – 1 July 1945
- 41st Sub Depot, 1 February 1943 – 31 March 1944

Wings

- 2842nd Transportation Control Wing, 26 February 1952 – 1 June 1953
- 2852nd Air Base Wing (later 2852d Air Base Group, 652nd Support Group, 652nd Air Base Group, 77th Air Base Wing), 1 August 1953 – 13 July 2001
- 2942nd Depot Training Wing, 16 March 1951 – 3 January 1955

Groups

- 19th Air Depot Group, August 1945 – 6 November 1945
- 23rd Air Depot Group, 1 February 1943 – 7 June 1943
- 33rd Air Depot Group, 23 June 1945 – 24 September 1945
- 56th Air Depot Group, 7 March 1943 – 5 December 1943
- 76th Air Depot Group, 1 February 1943 – 10 June 1943
- 77th Air Depot Group, 7 April 1943 – 30 June 1943
- 78th Air Depot Group, 13 March 1943 – 10 June 1943
- 79th Air Depot Group, 1 February 1943 – 10 June 1943
- 2793rd Base Medical Complement (later 2793rd Medical Group), 1 November 1948 – 1 August 1953
- 2902nd Air Depot Group (Mobile), 1 March 1956 – 1 January 1957
- 2923rd Area Supply (later 2793rd Area Supply Group), 1 November 1948 – 10 May 1953
- 2924th Area Maintenance (later 2793rd Area Maintenance Group), 1 November 1948 – 10 May 1953
- 3083rd Air Base Group, 5 October 1949 – 20 May 1950

Squadrons

- 2874th Test Squadron, later 337th Test Squadron, 1988-1994

=== Stations ===
- McClellan Field (later McClellan Air Force Base), California, 1 February 1943 – 13 July 2001
