= 324th Fighter-Interceptor Squadron =

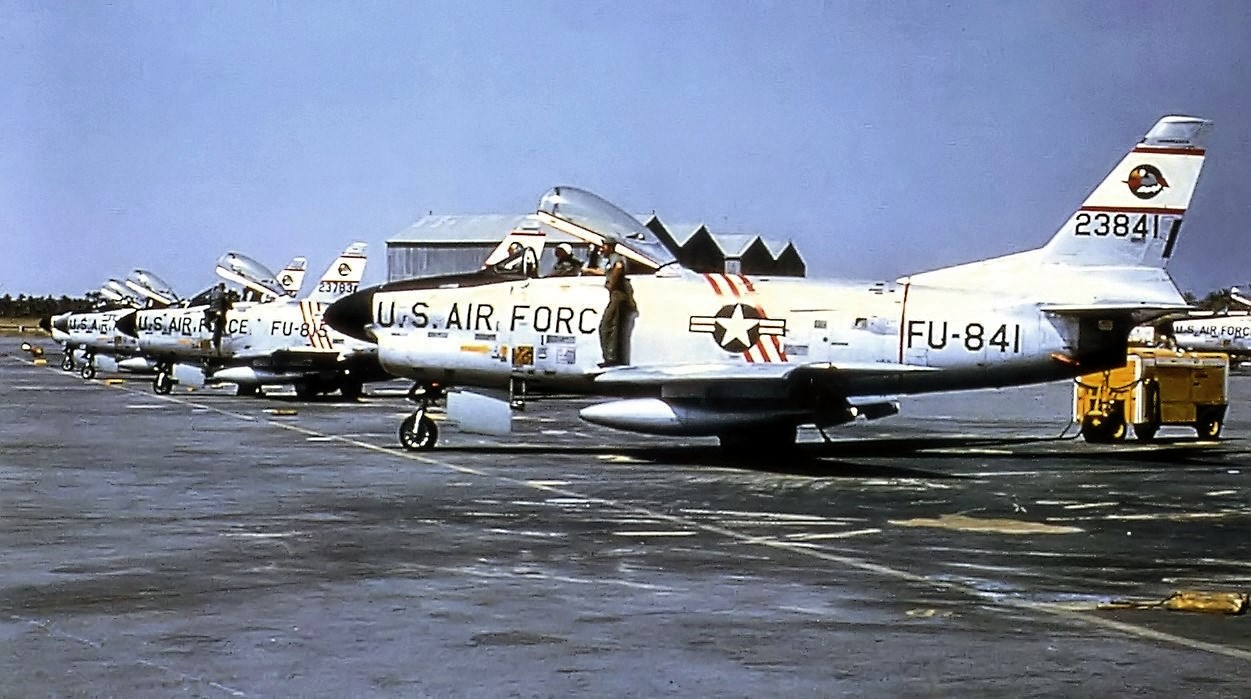
- Squadron F-86D Sabres, about 1956 at Westover AFB
- Active: 1942–1944; 1955–1960
- Country: United States
- Branch: United States Air Force
- Role: Fighter-Interceptor

Insignia
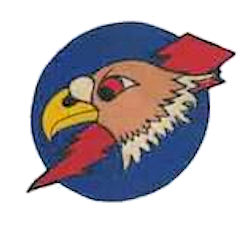
- 324th Fighter-Interceptor Squadron emblem (Note: Approved 17 May 1956. Description: Over a disc Air Force blue a bolt of lightning red, placed horizontally across the disc; superimposed over the bolt a stylized eagle's head light tan and white, beak Air Force yellow, cere and eyeball white, pupil black, iris red, all outlines and detail black.)

The 324th Fighter-Interceptor Squadron is an inactive United States Air Force unit. Its last assignment was with the 316th Air Division, stationed at Sidi Slimane Air Base, Morocco. It was inactivated on 8 March 1960.

== History ==
=== World War II ===
Activated in mid-1942 as an operational training unit, primarily for Republic P-47 Thunderbolts under I Fighter Command. Began replacement training in February 1944, inactivated in April when P-47 Thunderbolt training ended.

=== Air defense ===
Reactivated as an Air Defense Command interceptor squadron in July 1955 at Westover Air Force Base, Massachusetts flying North American F-86D Sabres, performing an air defense mission over Boston and the New England area. In 1957 began re-equipping with the North American F-86L Sabre, an improved version of the F-86D which incorporated data link to interface with the Semi Automatic Ground Environment computer-controlled direction system for intercepts. The service of the F-86L was destined to be quite brief, since by the time the last F-86L conversion was delivered, the type was already being phased out in favor of supersonic interceptors.

Reassigned to the Strategic Air Command Sixteenth Air Force in 1958, deployed to Morocco. Performed air defense over SAC Boeing B-47 Stratojet Operation Reflex bases. Inactivated in Morocco with SAC's withdrawal from North African bases in 1960.

== Lineage ==
- Constituted as the 324th Fighter Squadron on 24 June 1942

Activated on 25 August 1942
Disbanded on 10 April 1944

- Reconstituted and redesignated 324th Fighter-Interceptor Squadron on 8 July 1955

Activated on 18 October 1955
Discontinued on 8 March 1960

=== Assignments ===
- 327th Fighter Group, 25 August 1942 – 10 April 1944
- 4707th Air Defense Wing, 18 October 1955
- 4622d Air Defense Wing (later Boston Air Defense Sector), 18 October 1956
- 4729th Air Defense Group, 8 July 1957
- Boston Air Defense Sector, 25 June 1958
- 316th Air Division, 1 July 1958 – 8 March 1960

=== Stations ===
- Mitchel Field, New York, 25 August 1942
- Bolling Field, District of Columbia, 25 August 1942
- Richmond Army Air Base, Virginia, 20 September 1942 – 10 April 1944
- Westover Air Force Base, Massachusetts, 18 October 1955 – 25 June 1958
- Sidi Slimane Air Base, Morocco, 1 July 1958 – 8 March 1960

=== Aircraft ===
- Curtiss P-40 Warhawk, 1942–1943
- Republic P-47 Thunderbolt, 1943–1944
- North American F-86D Sabre, 1955–1957
- North American F-86L Sabre, 1957–1960
