= Coast Guard Air Station Sacramento =

US Coast Guard base in Sacramento County, California

- Active: 1978-present
- Country: United States
- Branch: United States Coast Guard
- Role: Medium-range search and rescue and maritime patrol.
- Size: 189 personnel, 6 aircraft

Aircraft flown
- Patrol: Alenia C-27J Spartan

Coast Guard Air Station Sacramento is an Air Station of the United States Coast Guard, located in Sacramento County, California. The station has 189 personnel assigned and operates 6 Alenia C-27J Spartan aircraft on medium-range patrol and search-and-rescue missions. It is located at McClellan Airfield, formerly McClellan Air Force Base, where it is the only remaining military tenant.
