= McClellan Park, California =

McClellan Park
- census-designated place
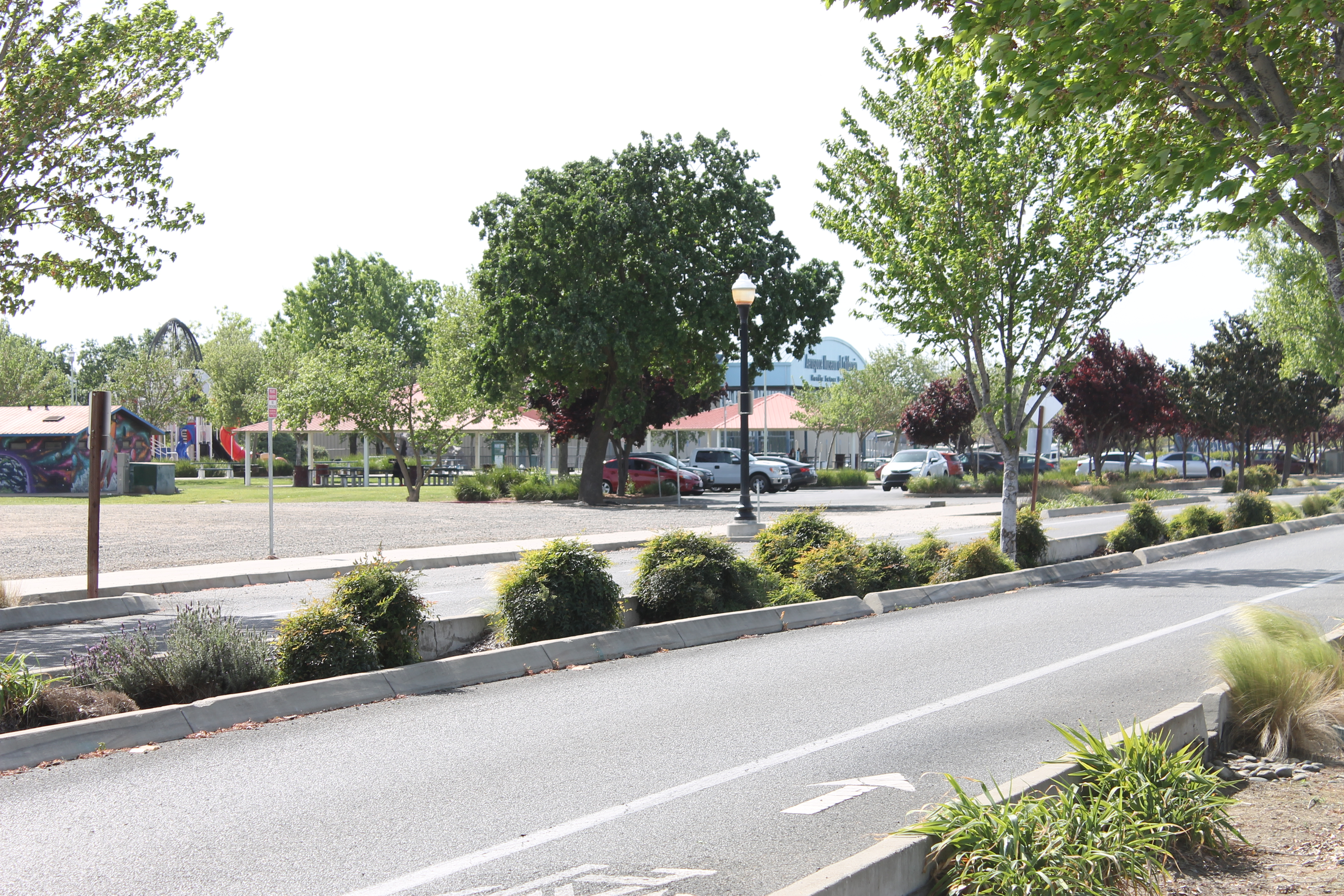

- Position in California.
- Coordinates: 38°39′44″N 121°24′06″W
- Country: United States
- State: California
- County: Sacramento

Area
  - Total: 4.068 sq mi (10.536 km^{2})
  - Land: 4.068 sq mi (10.536 km^{2})
  - Water: 0 sq mi (0 km^{2}) 0%
- Elevation: 69 ft (21 m)

Population (2020)
  - Total: 926
  - Density: 228/sq mi (87.9/km^{2})
- Time zone: UTC-8 (Pacific (PST))
  - Summer (DST): UTC-7 (PDT)
- ZIP Code: 95652
- Area codes: 279 & 916
- GNIS feature ID: 2583067

McClellan Park is a census-designated place (CDP) in Sacramento County, California, United States. McClellan Park sits at an elevation of 69 feet (21 m). The 2020 United States census reported that McClellan Park's population was 926. It is the site of the former McClellan Air Force Base, closed by the federal government in 2003. McClellan Air Force Base (currently McClellan Park) was named in honor of test pilot Hezekiah McClellan.

== Geography ==
According to the United States Census Bureau, the CDP covers an area of 4.1 square miles (10.5 km^{2}), all land.

== Demographics ==
Historical population
Census	Pop.	Note	%±
2010	743		—
2020	926		24.6%
U.S. Decennial Census; 1850–1870 1880-1890; 1900 1910 1920; 1930 1940 1950; 1960 1970 1980; 1990 2000 2010

McClellan Park first appeared as a census designated place in the 2010 U.S. census formed from part of the North Highland CDP and additional area.

The 2020 United States census reported that McClellan Park had a population of 926. The population density was 227.6 inhabitants per square mile (87.9/km^{2}). The racial makeup of McClellan Park was 401 (43.3%) White, 198 (21.4%) African American, 21 (2.3%) Native American, 59 (6.4%) Asian, 18 (1.9%) Pacific Islander, 93 (10.0%) from other races, and 136 (14.7%) from two or more races. Hispanic or Latino of any race were 201 persons (21.7%).

The census reported that 862 people (93.1% of the population) lived in households, 64 (6.9%) lived in non-institutionalized group quarters, and no one was institutionalized.

There were 317 households, out of which 137 (43.2%) had children under the age of 18 living in them, 80 (25.2%) were married-couple households, 33 (10.4%) were cohabiting couple households, 116 (36.6%) had a female householder with no partner present, and 88 (27.8%) had a male householder with no partner present. 94 households (29.7%) were one person, and 17 (5.4%) were one person aged 65 or older. The average household size was 2.72. There were 204 families (64.4% of all households).

The age distribution was 304 people (32.8%) under the age of 18, 65 people (7.0%) aged 18 to 24, 293 people (31.6%) aged 25 to 44, 200 people (21.6%) aged 45 to 64, and 64 people (6.9%) who were 65 years of age or older. The median age was 31.4 years. For every 100 females, there were 90.1 males.

There were 325 housing units at an average density of 79.9 units per square mile (30.8 units/km^{2}), of which 317 (97.5%) were occupied. Of these, 11 (3.5%) were owner-occupied, and 306 (96.5%) were occupied by renters.
