= Robla Elementary School District =

School district in California, United States

Location
- 5248 Rose St. Sacramento, California 95838 United States

District information
- Type: Public
- Grades: PreK-12
- Established: 8/11/1896
- Superintendent: Eileen Aguba Chen
- School board: Craig DeLuz Ken Barnes Raynell Hamilton-Starks Nuvia Cardona Sharona Devine Eileen Aguba Chen
- Schools: 1 preschool, 5 elementary, 1 middle school
- NCES District ID: 0633240

Students and staff
- Students: 2500

Other information
- Website: www.robla.k12.ca.us

Robla Elementary School District is a public school district in Sacramento County, California, United States.

Residents of this district are zoned to Twin Rivers Unified School District for grades 7-12.

== Elementary ==
- Bell Avenue Elementary School
- Glenwood Elementary School
- Main Avenue Elementary
- Robla Elementary
- Taylor Street Elementary

== Preschools ==
- Robla Preschool

== Middle Schools ==
- New Hope Charter School

== Other Schools ==
- Marconi Learning Academy (K-12)
- Paseo Grande Charter School (6-12)
