= Darren Oliver =

American baseball player (born 1970)

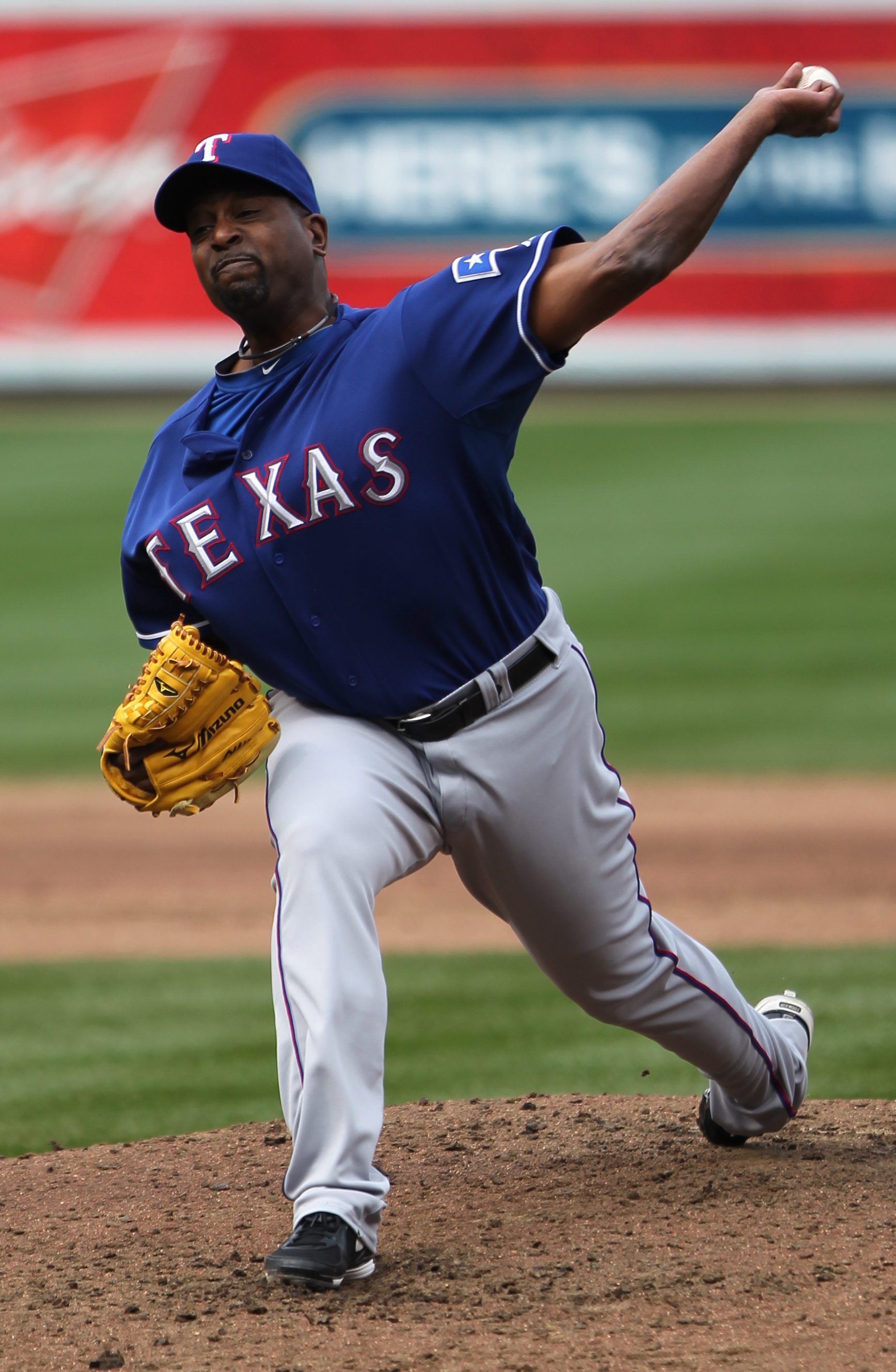
- Oliver with the Texas Rangers
- Pitcher
- Born: October 6, 1970 (age 56); Kansas City, Missouri, U.S.
- Batted: Right Threw: Left

MLB debut
- September 1, 1993, for the Texas Rangers

Last MLB appearance
- September 29, 2013, for the Toronto Blue Jays

MLB statistics
- Win–loss record: 118–98
- Earned run average: 4.51
- Strikeouts: 1,259
- Stats at Baseball Reference

Teams
- Texas Rangers (1993–1998); St. Louis Cardinals (1998–1999); Texas Rangers (2000–2001); Boston Red Sox (2002); Colorado Rockies (2003); Florida Marlins (2004); Houston Astros (2004); New York Mets (2006); Los Angeles Angels of Anaheim (2007–2009); Texas Rangers (2010–2011); Toronto Blue Jays (2012–2013)

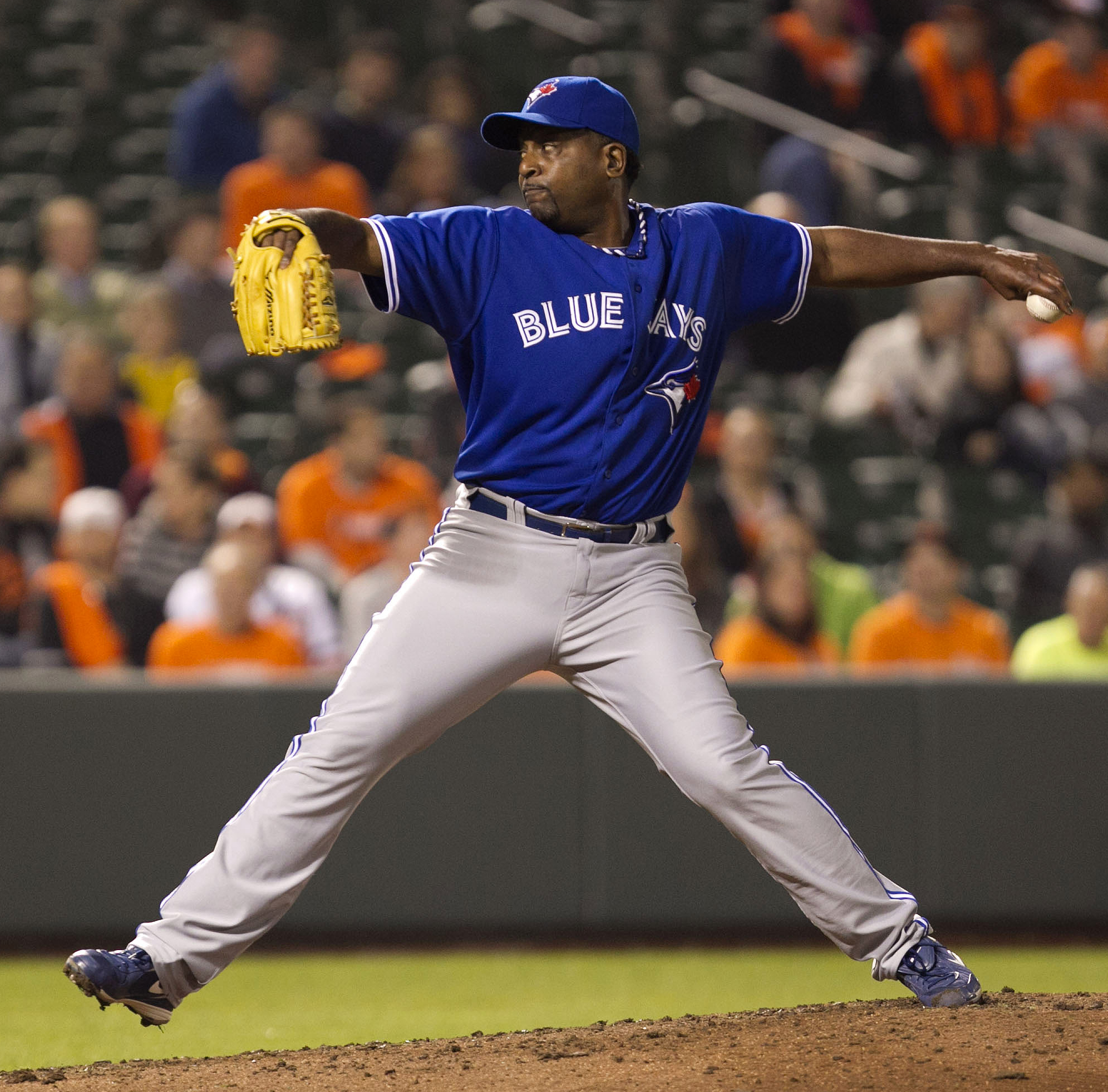
Oliver pitching for the Toronto Blue Jays

Darren Christopher Oliver (born October 6, 1970) is an American former professional baseball pitcher. He is a second generation major league player, as his father Bob Oliver played in the major leagues for nine seasons between 1967 and 1975.

== Early life ==
Oliver is the son of former infielder Bob Oliver. Darren played baseball and basketball at Rio Linda High School in Rio Linda, California.

== Professional career ==
=== Early professional career (1993–2005) ===
Oliver made his major league debut on September 1, 1993, at the age of 22 at Fenway Park against the Boston Red Sox. In 1996, Oliver became a starter for the Rangers and won 14 games. Oliver is the first pitcher ever to pitch in interleague play. He was the starting pitcher in the Texas Rangers' 4–3 loss to the San Francisco Giants on June 12, 1997, at The Ballpark in Arlington. From 1993 to 1998, Oliver pitched for the Rangers.

On July 31, 1998, the Rangers traded Oliver, Fernando Tatís, and a player to be named later (Mark Little) to the St. Louis Cardinals for Royce Clayton and Todd Stottlemyre. He pitched for St. Louis until 1999, returning to the Rangers for the next two years. As a Cardinal, he was also the starting and winning pitcher in the game where Mark McGwire hit his record-tying 61st home run on September 7, 1998.

In 2002, Oliver pitched for the Boston Red Sox, initially as a starter, before being sent to the bullpen before his outright release. In 2003, Oliver won 13 games for the Colorado Rockies. In 2004, Oliver pitched for the Florida Marlins and Houston Astros. After 2004, he became a free agent.

In 2004, Oliver was one of four African-American starting pitchers in Major League Baseball.

In 2005, the Rockies brought him to their spring training camp, but released him. Oliver missed the entire season.

=== New York Mets (2006) ===
After the 2005 season, Oliver signed with the New York Mets as a reliever. Oliver proved to be very useful in the Mets' bullpen, going 4–1 with a 3.44 ERA in 45 games and 81 innings. He made a six-inning relief appearance in Game 3 of the 2006 NLCS. Despite not giving up a run, the Mets lost the game and were down 2–1 in the series. He was mentioned as a potential starter for Game 7; the Mets instead tapped Óliver Pérez as the starter.

=== Los Angeles Angels of Anaheim (2007–2009) ===
Oliver became a free agent at the end of the 2006 season. He signed with the Los Angeles Angels of Anaheim, joining Nolan Ryan as the only two players to play for all four original MLB expansion teams (Washington Senators/Texas Rangers, Angels, Mets and Astros). Both Darren and his father, Bob, were also one-time teammates of Ryan: Bob from 1972–74, and Darren in 1993, Ryan's final major league season.

In 2009, Oliver posted a 5–1 record with a 2.71 ERA. Steve Bisheff of the Los Angeles Times called Oliver the "Postseason's Hidden Hero", commenting "The most underrated of all the Angels was their most consistent pitcher in the playoffs." He said the Angels should re-sign him for 2010 despite his age at 39, adding "The Angels would be crazy not to re-sign him."

However, the Angels did not offer Oliver salary arbitration and they did not agree on terms for his contract.

=== Return to Texas (2010–2011) ===
On December 22, 2009, Oliver signed a one-year $3.5 million contract to return to the Texas Rangers, with a vesting option for 2011 based on the number of games pitched. It was his third stint with the Rangers. On September 15, his 2011 option vested.

On April 22, 2010, Oliver recorded his third career save with the Rangers, which set a record for the longest amount of time between saves for a single team at 15 years and 271 days.

In 2011, Oliver finished 5–5 with a 2.29 ERA. He was the sixth-oldest player in the American League.

=== Toronto Blue Jays (2012–2013) ===
On December 30, 2011, Oliver signed with the Toronto Blue Jays as a free agent. On January 9, 2012, the Blue Jays finalized Oliver's one-year, $4.5 million deal, with a $3 million option for 2013. For the 2012 season, Oliver posted the best numbers of his career, finishing with a 3-4 record, 2.06 earned run average, and 52 strikeouts in 56 2/3 innings pitched. During the offseason, it was reported that Oliver and his agent, former Blue Jay Jeff Frye, attempted to renegotiate his contract with the Blue Jays, demanding a higher salary from the team, or a trade to the Texas Rangers to be closer to where he lives in the offseason with his family. General Manager Alex Anthopoulos later said "His contract is his contract. That's what we signed him to. I don't see us doing that", and that he ultimately expected Oliver to retire. On January 16, 2013, Oliver announced that he would honor his contract for the upcoming season.

Oliver was placed on the 15-day disabled list on May 24, 2013, with a left shoulder strain. He was activated from the DL on June 9, with Thad Weber being optioned to make room on the 25-man roster. Oliver was the pitcher of record in a 4–2 win against the Baltimore Orioles on June 22, 2013, when the Blue Jays extended their winning streak to 10 games.

Shortly before the end of the 2013 season, Oliver made a request to start the final game of the season, which would have been granted had the Blue Jays not won their previous two games over the Tampa Bay Rays, who were still in playoff contention. The start would have been his first since the 2009 season. The two wins moved Tampa Bay down into a tie with the Texas Rangers for the second wild card spot going into the final day of the regular season. He was honored before his final game with a montage of career highlights, and made a relief appearance in the game, pitching one inning and striking out two batters without yielding a base runner.

== Post-playing career ==
On April 24, 2014, it was announced that Oliver had accepted a front office role with the Texas Rangers, working as a special assistant to general manager Jon Daniels.

Oliver was eligible to be elected into the Hall of Fame in 2019, but received less than 5% of the vote and became ineligible for the 2020 ballot.

Oliver served as the pitching coach for the National League team in the 2024 All-Star Futures Game.

== See also ==
- List of second-generation Major League Baseball players
