= North Highlands, California =

North Highlands
- Census-designated place
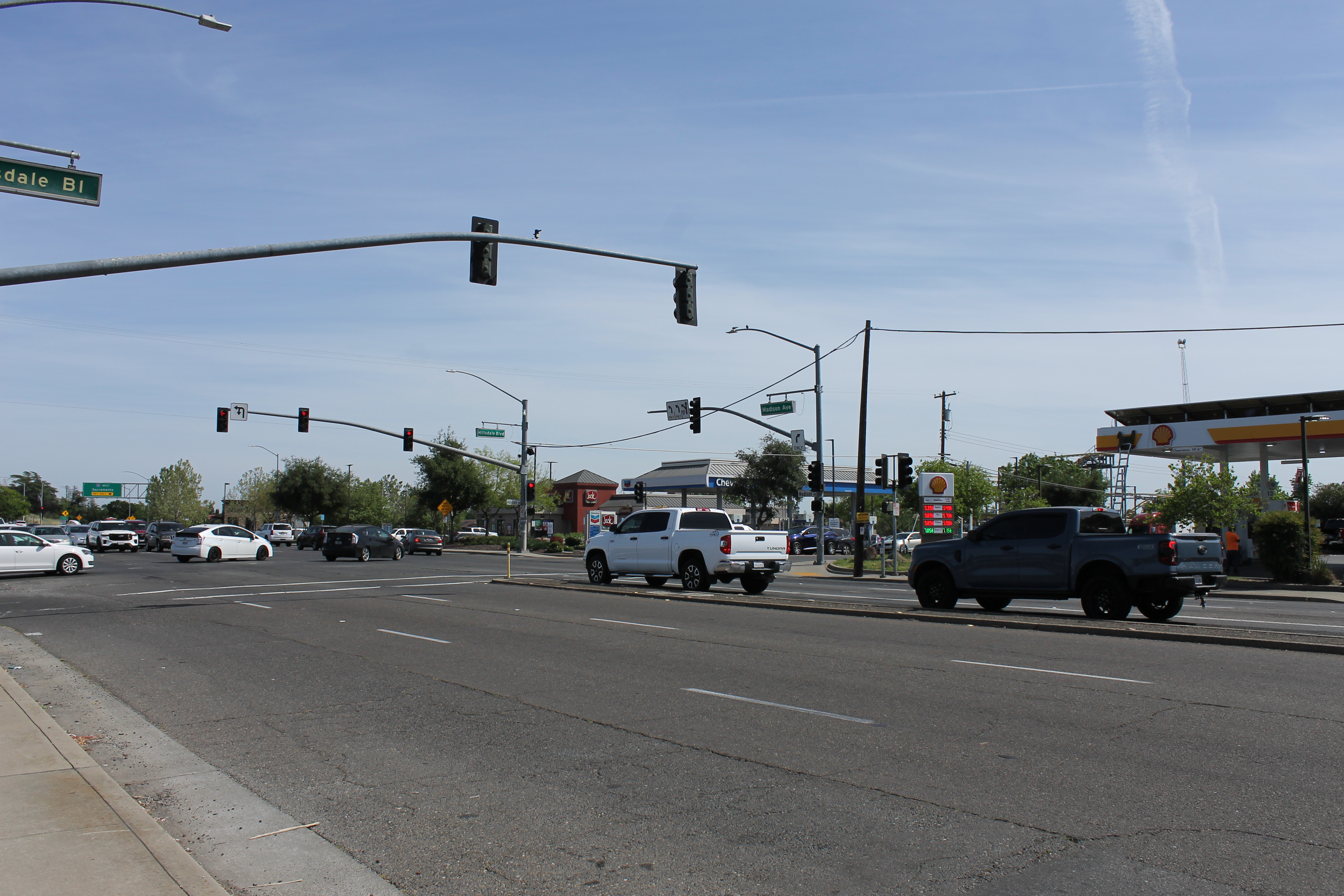
- Interactive map of North Highlands
- Location in California Location in the United States
- Coordinates: 38°40′23″N 121°22′22″W
- Country: United States
- State: California
- County: Sacramento

Area
  - Total: 8.812 sq mi (22.82 km^{2})
  - Land: 8.812 sq mi (22.82 km^{2})
  - Water: 0 sq mi (0 km^{2}) 0%
- Elevation: 95 ft (29 m)

Population (2020)
  - Total: 49,327
  - Density: 5,598/sq mi (2,161/km^{2})
- Time zone: UTC-8 (Pacific)
  - Summer (DST): UTC-7 (PDT)
- ZIP code: 95660
- Area code: 916, 279
- FIPS code: 06-51924
- GNIS feature IDs: 1656191, 2408941

North Highlands is a census-designated place (CDP) in Sacramento County, California, United States. It is part of the Sacramento metropolitan area. The population was 49,327 at the 2020 census, up from 42,694 at the 2010 census.

== Geography ==
North Highlands is located at 38°40′23″N 121°22′22″W (38.673003, -121.372698).

According to the United States Census Bureau, the CDP has a total area of 8.8 square miles (23 km^{2}), all land.

=== Climate ===
According to the Köppen Climate Classification system, North Highlands has a hot-summer Mediterranean climate, abbreviated "Csa" on climate maps.

== Information ==
Until 2008, North Highlands was served by two school districts, Rio Linda Union School District, which covered K–6 grade; and Grant Joint Union High School District, for grades 7–12. In 2008, the two districts merged, creating the Twin Rivers Unified School District. The local high school is Highlands High School, which is surrounded by quite a few elementary and charter schools.

North Highlands is a low-income residential housing area, with some commercial and industrial regions around the former McClellan Air Force Base, now a civilian business center and airport called McClellan Business Park. In 1995, McClellan Air Force Base was identified for closure as part of the Base Realignment and Closure (BRAC) IV process. North Highlands has a high crime rate for an area of its size. The main streets are Watt Avenue, Elkhorn Blvd, and Walerga Road.

== Demographics ==
Historical population
Census	Pop.	Note	%±
1960	21,271		—
1970	31,854		49.8%
1980	37,825		18.7%
1990	42,105		11.3%
2000	44,187		4.9%
2010	42,694		−3.4%
2020	49,327		15.5%
U.S. Decennial Census; 1860–1870 1880-1890; 1900 1910 1920; 1930 1940 1950; 1960 1970 1980; 1990 2000 2010

North Highlands first appeared as an unincorporated place in the 1960 U.S. census; and was designated a census designated place in the 1980 U.S. census.

=== 2020 census ===
As of the 2020 census, North Highlands had a population of 49,327 and a population density of 5,597.7 inhabitants per square mile (2,161.3/km^{2}). The median age was 33.6 years. 26.9% of residents were under the age of 18, 9.2% were aged 18 to 24, 29.1% were aged 25 to 44, 22.3% were aged 45 to 64, and 12.5% were 65 years of age or older. For every 100 females there were 95.8 males, and for every 100 females age 18 and over there were 92.7 males age 18 and over.

100.0% of residents lived in urban areas, while 0.0% lived in rural areas. The census reported that 98.2% of residents lived in households, 1.4% lived in non-institutionalized group quarters, and 0.4% were institutionalized.

There were 16,092 households, of which 38.1% had children under the age of 18 living in them. Of all households, 40.6% were married-couple households, 9.0% were cohabiting couple households, 30.9% had a female householder with no spouse or partner present, and 19.5% had a male householder with no spouse or partner present. About 22.5% of all households were made up of individuals and 8.8% had someone living alone who was 65 years of age or older. The average household size was 3.01. There were 11,215 families (69.7% of all households).

There were 16,709 housing units, of which 3.7% were vacant. The homeowner vacancy rate was 1.4% and the rental vacancy rate was 3.8%. Of the 16,092 occupied housing units, 48.0% were owner-occupied and 52.0% were occupied by renters.

Racial composition as of the 2020 census
Race	Number	Percent
White	24,377	49.4%
Black or African American	5,281	10.7%
American Indian and Alaska Native	881	1.8%
Asian	3,543	7.2%
Native Hawaiian and Other Pacific Islander	430	0.9%
Some other race	8,008	16.2%
Two or more races	6,807	13.8%
Hispanic or Latino (of any race)	14,402	29.2%

=== 2023 American Community Survey ===
In 2023, the US Census Bureau estimated that 27.7% of the population were foreign-born. Of all people aged 5 or older, 59.2% spoke only English at home, 21.0% spoke Spanish, 15.6% spoke other Indo-European languages, 3.3% spoke Asian or Pacific Islander languages, and 1.0% spoke other languages. Of those aged 25 or older, 83.9% were high school graduates and 14.9% had a bachelor's degree.

The median household income in 2023 was $65,090, and the per capita income was $27,919. About 15.6% of families and 19.6% of the population were below the poverty line.

=== 2010 census ===
The 2010 United States census reported that North Highlands had a population of 42,694. The population density was 4,834.4 inhabitants per square mile (1,866.6/km^{2}). The racial makeup of North Highlands was 27,000 (63.2%) White, 4,883 (11.4%) African American, 603 (1.4%) Native American, 2,067 (4.8%) Asian, 300 (0.7%) Pacific Islander, 4,709 (11.0%) from other races, and 3,132 (7.3%) from two or more races. Hispanic or Latino of any race were 10,077 persons (23.6%).

The Census reported that 42,433 people (99.4% of the population) lived in households, 90 (0.2%) lived in non-institutionalized group quarters, and 171 (0.4%) were institutionalized.

There were 14,542 households, out of which 5,713 (39.3%) had children under the age of 18 living in them, 5,825 (40.1%) were opposite-sex married couples living together, 2,979 (20.5%) had a female householder with no husband present, 1,170 (8.0%) had a male householder with no wife present. There were 1,295 (8.9%) unmarried opposite-sex partnerships, and 116 (0.8%) same-sex married couples or partnerships. 3,376 households (23.2%) were made up of individuals, and 1,144 (7.9%) had someone living alone who was 65 years of age or older. The average household size was 2.92. There were 9,974 families (68.6% of all households); the average family size was 3.44.

The population age distribution is 11,836 people (27.7%) under the age of 18, 4,904 people (11.5%) aged 18 to 24, 11,385 people (26.7%) aged 25 to 44, 9,825 people (23.0%) aged 45 to 64, and 4,744 people (11.1%) who were 65 years of age or older. The median age was 32.1 years. For every 100 females, there were 96.0 males. For every 100 females age 18 and over, there were 92.2 males.

There were 16,093 housing units at an average density of 1,822.3 per square mile (703.6/km^{2}), of which 7,112 (48.9%) were owner-occupied, and 7,430 (51.1%) were occupied by renters. The homeowner vacancy rate was 3.5%; the rental vacancy rate was 10.6%. 19,763 people (46.3% of the population) lived in owner-occupied housing units and 22,670 people (53.1%) lived in rental housing units.

== Government ==
In the California State Senate, North Highlands is in the 8th senatorial district, represented by Democrat Angelique Ashby. In the California State Assembly, it is in the 7th Assembly district, represented by Republican Josh Hoover.

In the United States House of Representatives, North Highlands is in California's 6th congressional district.

== Notable residents ==
- Scott Galbraith, NFL player, Super Bowl XXVIII champion
- Sasha Grey, pornographic actress
- Brian Lewis, gold medalist, 4 × 100 m, 2000 Sydney Olympics
- Jeremy Powell, pro baseball player, minor league coach
- Michael Wortham, NFL wide receiver for the Jacksonville Jaguars
- Jimmy Zavala, musician, songwriter, producer
