= McClellan Air Force Base =

Human settlement in California, United States

- Sacramento County, California in the United States
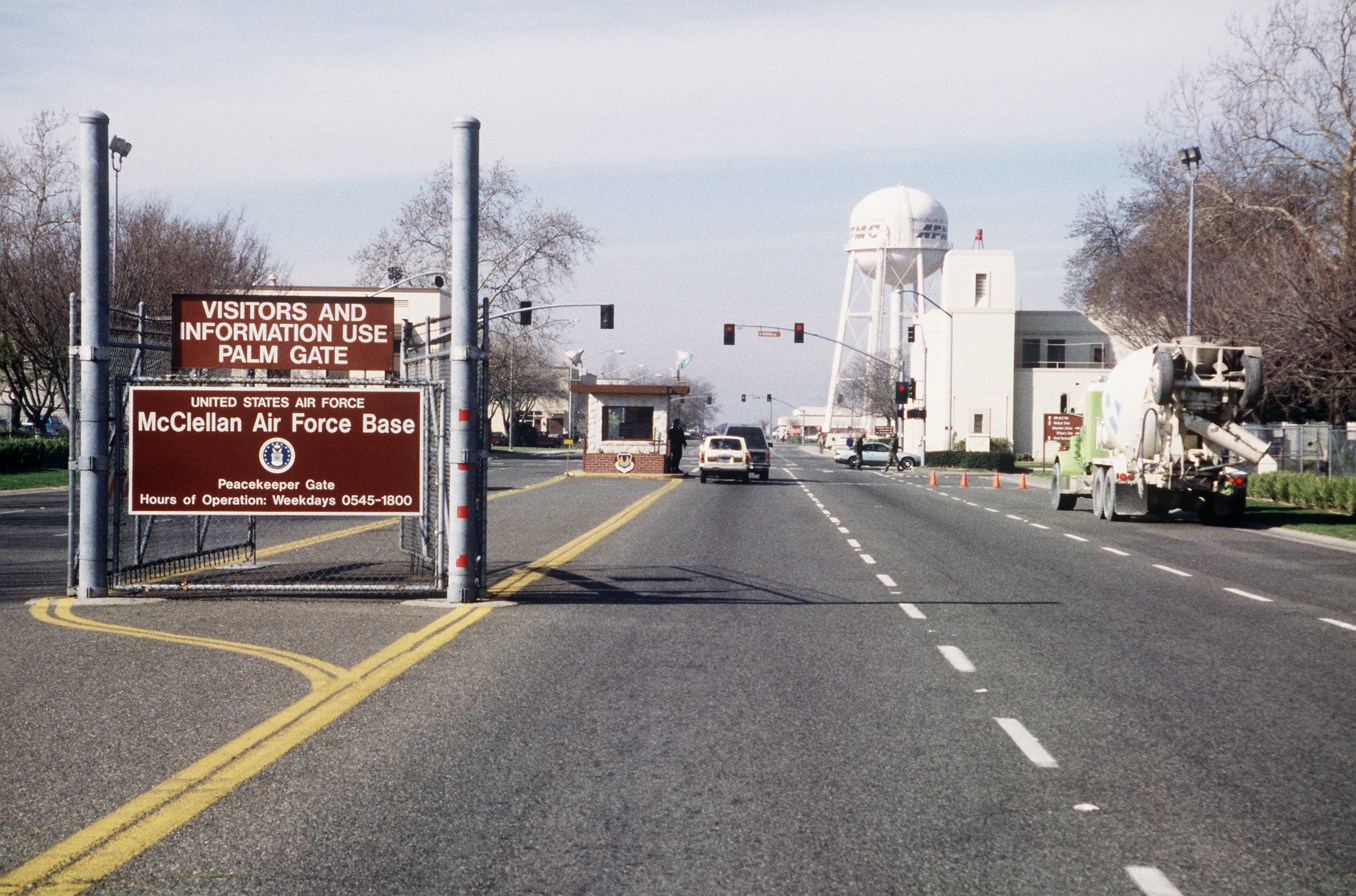
- Peacekeeper Gate at McClellan AFB in 1995

Site information
- Type: Air Force Base
- Owner: Department of Defense
- Operator: United States Air Force
- Condition: Closed
- Website: Official website (archived)

Location
- Location in the United States Location in California
- Coordinates: 38°40′04″N 121°24′02″W

Site history
- Built: 1935 (as Pacific Air Depot)
- In use: 1935 – 2001
- Fate: Airfield became Sacramento McClellan Airport and McClellan Business Park. Partially realigned to US Coast Guard as CGAS Sacramento

Garrison information
- Garrison: Sacramento Air Logistics Center

Airfield information
- Identifiers: FAA LID: MCC, WMO: 0724836
- Elevation: 75 feet (23 m) AMSL

McClellan Air Force Base (1935–2001) is a former United States Air Force base in California, located in the North Highlands area of Sacramento County, seven miles (11 km) northeast of Sacramento.

== History ==
For the vast majority of its operational lifetime, McClellan was a logistics and maintenance facility for a wide variety of military aircraft, equipment and supplies. Initially known as the Pacific Air Depot and Sacramento Air Depot, in 1939 the base was renamed for Major Hezekiah McClellan, a pioneer in arctic aeronautical tests. Born in 1894, he died on May 25, 1936 when his Consolidated P-30 which he was flight testing crashed near Centerville, Ohio.

In 1986, the U.S. Air Force established the McClellan Aviation Museum on what was then McClellan Air Force Base. The museum was later chartered by the National Museum of the United States Air Force.

The United States Coast Guard previously operated Coast Guard Air Station Sacramento at McClellan AFB as a tenant activity, operating and maintaining several HC-130 Hercules aircraft. CGAS Sacramento continues to operate at McClellan following its closure as an Air Force Base and is the only remaining military aviation unit and installation on the airfield.

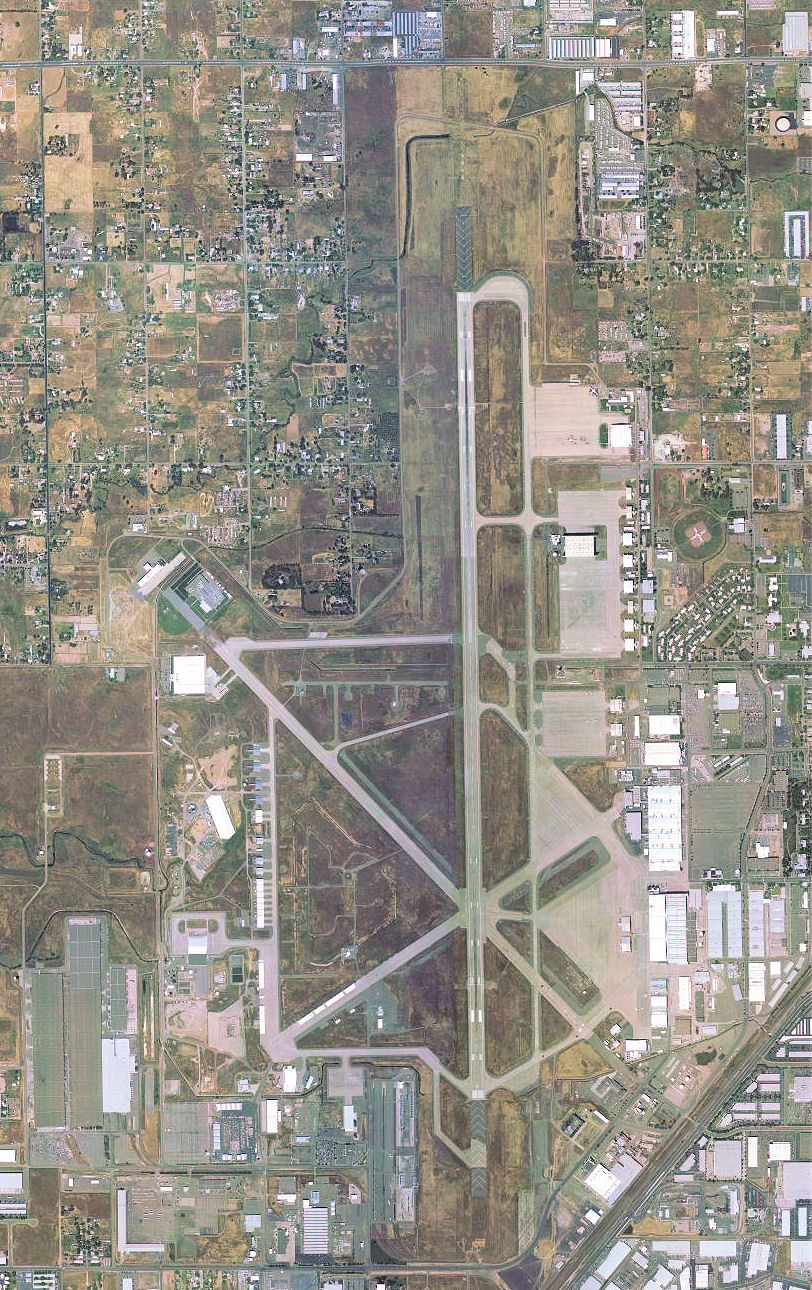
An aerial image of McClellan AFB from 2002

In 1993, the base was selected by the Pentagon for closure. At first, McClellan was scratched from a list of bases to be closed, but that decision was faced with allegations that the Clinton administration was playing politics. The base was eventually selected for closure, and there were plans to offset the expected loss of $1.5 billion, and 11,000 jobs, to the California economy. The plan relied on privatization and other investment to offset the economic and employment losses. The base is now McClellan Business Park, a growing business enclave that hosts a diverse mix of companies spread across more than 8 million square feet of space of all types. This former military facility is now home to hundreds of private companies, as well as state, federal and local government agencies. It is also home to AmeriCorps*NCCC Pacific Region

The Air Force Reserve's 604th Regional Support Group, part of Fourth Air Force, was planned to move to March Air Reserve Base, CA., in July 1997, as a result of various Base Closure and Realignment Commission (BRAC) changes.

In 2005, the McClellan Aviation Museum changed its name to the Aerospace Museum of California. Various military aircraft sit on display inside one of the hangars, and many more are outside on the flightline. The museum has displays which highlight the mission of the base when it was active, as well as neighboring bases such as Beale AFB, Travis AFB and the since closed Mather AFB. The museum hosts educational programs to schools in the local area.

In 2015, the Sacramento Bee reported that McClellan Airfield had been designated as a Superfund site, because the Environmental Protection Agency has identified 326 waste areas on the base. Water wells closest to the base in the Rio Linda-Elverta district, have had the highest levels of hexavalent chromium, which is a known carcinogen. Water from six of 11 wells tested above the state's maximum contaminant levels for chromium-6, which is 10 parts per billion.

== Names ==
- Pacific Air Depot, 1935 - February 1, 1937
- Sacramento Air Depot February 1, 1937 – December 1, 1939
- McClellan Field, December 1, 1939 – January 13, 1948
- McClellan Air Force Base (dates to be confirmed, closed 2001)
- McClellan Business Park, 2009–present

== Major command assignments ==
- Memorial Plaque of McClellan AFB
  Material Division, United States Army Air Corps, August 24, 1938 – December 11, 1941
- Air Service Command, December 11, 1941 – July 17, 1944
- Army Air Forces Materiel and Services Command, July 17, 1944 – August 31, 1944
- Army Air Forces Technical Service Command, August 31, 1944 – July 1, 1945
- Air Technical Service Command, July 1, 1945 – March 9, 1946
- Air Materiel Command, March 9, 1946 – April 1, 1961
- Air Force Logistics Command, April 1, 1961 – July 1, 1992
- Air Force Materiel Command, July 1, 1992 – July 13, 2001

== Environmental contamination ==
The McClellan Restoration Advisory Board provides a forum for the local community, regulatory agencies, and Air Force to share information on current and future environmental cleanup programs and reuse at the former base.

== See also ==
- California World War II Army Airfields
- Western Air Defense Force (Air Defense Command)
- 8th Air Division
- Doolittle Raid
- McClellan AFB Annex
