= George Wright (organist) =

American musician (1920–1998)

George Wright (born George Wilbur Wright, August 28, 1920 – May 10, 1998) was an American musician, undoubtedly the most famous virtuoso of the theatre organ of the modern era.

Wright was best known for his virtuoso performances on the huge Wurlitzer theater pipe organs at the famed Fox Theater on Market Street in San Francisco and the ornate Paramount Theaters in both New York City and Oakland. In the early 1940s he was an active performer on radio, first on the west coast; in 1944 he was transferred to New York City by NBC, and played numerous radio shows from 1944-1951. In 1948 he was hired as solo organist at the Paramount Theatre in Times Square. He left New York in 1951. The early 50s brought fame via his iconic recordings on HIFI Records, using the 5-manual Wurlitzer originally from the Paradise Theatre, Chicago, installed in the home of HIFI owner Richard Vaughn. The 60s brought more fame through his recordings (primarily on the DOT label) on the organ sponsored by Leslie organ speaker inventor Don Leslie and installed in his warehouse on S. Fair Oaks Blvd. in South Pasadena. In the 70s, he installed a theatre pipe organ in his home in the Hollywood Hills, where he recorded numerous LPs on the BANDA label in the 1980s and early 90s. He concertized widely across the United States. He also played two concerts in the UK (one on a Conn electronic organ, as a Conn promotional event, the other on the Wurlitzer organ in the Gaumont State Theatre, Kilburn, London).

== Early years ==
Wright was born George Wilbur Wright on August 28, 1920, in Orland, California, the son of parents Lulu Ethel (née Spears 12 January 1900 – 15 February 1975) and John Charles Wright (25 November 1895 – 7 November 1966). His mother was a private music teacher. Wright learned to play the piano at an early age from his mother. His mother also was a movie accompanist on the piano for silent movies played at the Orland Theatre.

He grew up in Stockton and Sacramento, where he graduated from Grant Union High School in 1938. Wright helped install a theater organ at Grant High that still remains and plays.

== Career ==
In 1938, he had his first playing job at a Chinese night club in Oakland, called the New Shanghai Cafe and Terrace Bowl, which boasted a 2-manual, 6-rank Wurlitzer; the show was broadcast nightly by an Oakland radio station. In 1941, he joined San Francisco radio station KFRC and played on the NBC Blue Network by 1942. In December, 1942 he started performing at the San Francisco Fox Theater on Saturday nights. In late 1944, he relocated to New York City to work as organist for NBC radio. He began recording at this time, first cutting 78 rpm records for Syd Nathan's King Records and Regent Records, in addition to securing contracts for transcription disks on the Thesaurus, Associated, and Muzak labels. In New York, he was a guest on the Paul Whiteman "Stairway to the Stars" radio program (May 21, 1946) and Percy Faith, as well as on the network shows of Bing Crosby and Perry Como. He also conducted his own orchestra on the Robert Q. Lewis show and began a seven-year stint playing in a trio with Charles Magnante, accordionist, and Tony Mottola, guitarist, for Jack Berch's NBC show sponsored by the Prudential Insurance Company. The trio, with added bassist Bobby Haggart, recorded five "Soundies" as well.

In 1948, Wright signed on as house organist for the Paramount Theater in New York. There, he played with many of the great jazz and pop artists of the time, including Frank Sinatra, Frankie Laine and Ella Fitzgerald. During his time in New York he made several recordings on both the organ in the New York Paramount's theatre and on the organ in the studio above the theatre - the organ on which Jesse Crawford made many of his most famous recordings. These recordings were first released as 78 rpm singles and later compiled into LP releases on the King label (organ in the theatre) and Regent label (organ in the studio with the addition of Cozy Cole on drums). Wright moved to Los Angeles in 1951 and in the mid 50's began making a series of recordings for Richard Vaughn's High Fidelity Recordings, Inc. label on a 5-manual, 21 rank Wurlitzer organ which Vaughn had acquired from the Paradise Theatre in Chicago (he was the first act signed to the label after its founding). Vaughn claimed that Wright's first seven albums for HIFI Records sold 1,000,000 copies in their first two years of release. Wright went on to record 20 albums for the HiFi label. By the late 1950s, Wright developed an avid, if cult-sized, following for his solo organ concerts during this time and was able to fill big variety-era theaters long after their main audiences had shriveled. Wright became renowned among theater organists for his pyrotechnic virtuosity, devising novel effects and pulling off lightning fast stop changes.

In 1963 Wright became ABC's musical director for the West Coast, including becoming the studio organist (and eventual musical director) for the soap opera General Hospital. Wright remained with the show even after it switched from live broadcasts to video tape in the 1970s, and as musical cues modernized, he even began composing piano arrangements for GH's underscore. In his next-to-last year with the soap, Wright was asked to compose new theme music for GH, a piano-dominated tune which debuted on the program in April 1975. Over a year later, in July 1976, then-executive producer Tom Donovan chose to replace Wright's music with the style of another director. Wright, his scores, and his GH theme song were history (with the latter being replaced by the piece that will forever be the closest association of GH in history, "Autumn Breeze" by Jack Urbont).

During his long career, George Wright played a key role in reviving interest in theater organ music. He recorded more than 60 albums. Wright was the first act signed to Richard Vaughn's HIFI Records and recorded 20 albums as their featured organist in the late 1950s before switching to Dot Records in 1963.

On his HIFI albums, Wright is a perfect complement to the label's star, Arthur Lyman. His Dot albums are somewhat less showy, though he continues to work with a considerable range of material, from old standards to Dave Brubeck's "It's a Raggy Waltz." In August 1970, however, the studio/warehouse (owned by organ speaker inventory Don Leslie) where he kept his personal pipe organ burned and he stopped recording for over 10 years.

Wright bought a house in Hollywood Hills California less for its location but more for its capacity to accommodate his own Wurlitzer theatre pipe organ. He worked on it constantly, swapping out pieces he collected in his travels around the U.S.

In 1980, his friend Bob Power founded BANDA Records for the purpose of recording Wright, and many of his albums were available from BANDA. In 1995, he was presented with the first Lifetime Achievement Award by the American Theatre Organ Society. He continued to play at concerts and make recordings to the end, and many unreleased tapes have been digitized after the acquisition of BANDA. He finished his last album, Salon, just 60 days before his death. BANDA has released almost nothing since the early 2000s however, but the new owner of BANDA (George Wright biographer William L. Coale, PhD.) has issued numerous new offerings, including Back to School and an all-piano offering Gin & Tonic

Wright's organ recordings were distributed on the Associated Program Service Transcriptions, Muzak, Thesaurus Transcription Service, Armed Forces Radio Service, RCA Custom (under the pseudonym Jocelyn McNeil), RCA Camden (under the pseudonym Guy Melendy), Malar, King, Regent, Lurite, Doric, Century, Hamilton, Reader's Digest, Essential, BANDA, HiFi, SOLO, and DOT labels.

Wright died of heart failure, pneumonia on May 10, 1998, at the Glendale Memorial Hospital in Los Angeles with his life partner Tom Shoot at his side. His remains were cremated by the Neptune Society and scattered in the organization's Rose Garden.
