= Rio Linda, California =

Rio Linda
- Census-designated place
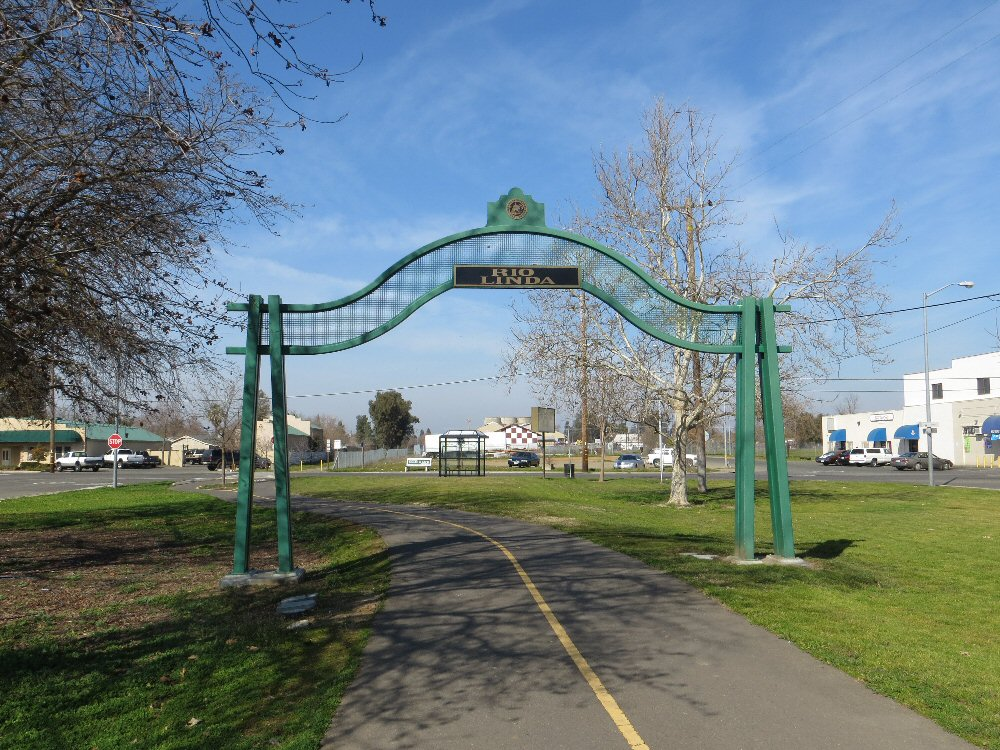
- Interactive map of Rio Linda
- Location in the United States
- Coordinates: 38°41′25″N 121°27′14″W
- Country: United States
- State: California
- County: Sacramento

Area
  - Total: 9.927 sq mi (25.71 km^{2})
  - Land: 9.927 sq mi (25.71 km^{2})
  - Water: 0 sq mi (0 km^{2}) 0%
- Elevation: 56 ft (17 m)

Population (2020)
  - Total: 15,944
  - Density: 1,606/sq mi (620.1/km^{2})
- Time zone: UTC-8 (PST)
  - Summer (DST): UTC-7 (PDT)
- ZIP code: 95673
- Area codes: 916, 279
- FIPS code: 06-60942
- GNIS feature ID: 1659514

Rio Linda (Spanish: Río Linda, meaning "Pretty River") is a census-designated place (CDP) in Sacramento County, California, United States. It is part of the Sacramento metropolitan area. As of the 2020 census, the CDP population was 15,944, up from 15,106 at the time of the 2010 census.

== History ==
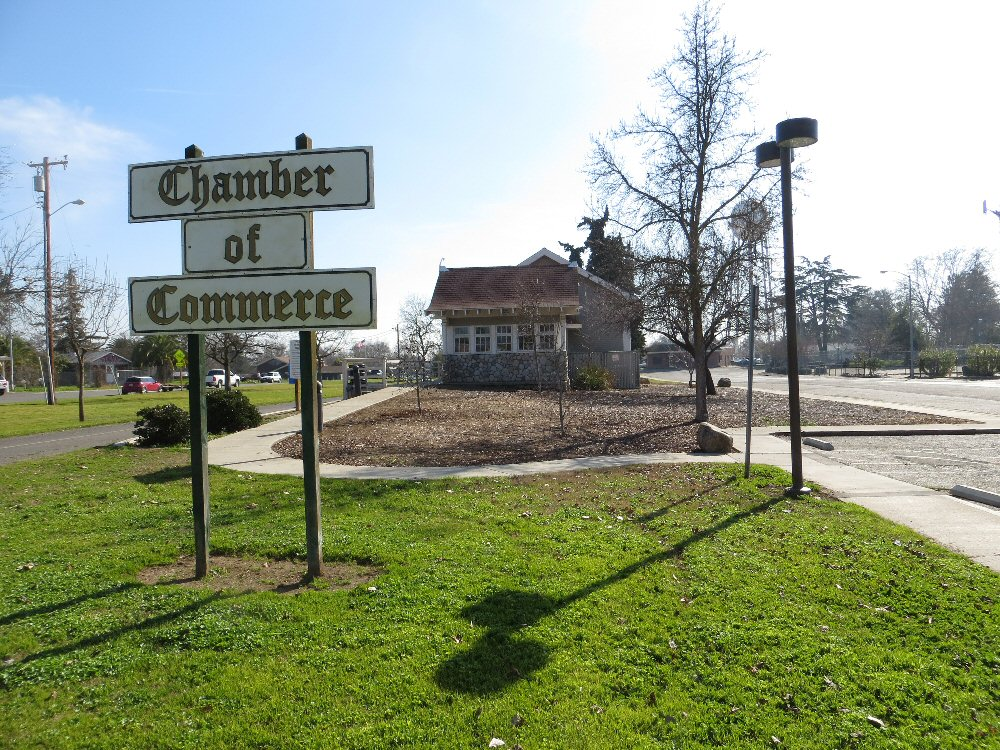
Chamber of Commerce

The Rio Linda/Elverta community is located on part of the Rancho Del Paso Mexican land grant of 1844. In 1910, a Fruit Land Company of Minneapolis acquired 12,000 acres (49 km^{2}) of the Grant and in 1912 the area was subdivided. Renamed Rio Linda in 1913, it was known as "Dry Creek Station", a flag stop for the Northern Electric Railroad, renamed the Sacramento Northern Railway after joining the San Francisco–Sacramento system to improve service in the Sacramento Valley. Two families settled in Rio Linda by 1912, three more arrived in 1913, and nine more in 1914. By 1918, approximately 50 families in the community, mostly of Scandinavian and German descent. By 1920, poultry farming had proved to be feasible in the area which was advertised throughout several Eastern states during the 1920s. The Sacramento Northern Railway stopped commuter services in 1940, redirecting focus to freight in the wake of World War II. An association was formed between Rio Linda and Elverta in 1942 as the area became more well known for its excellent poultry production. Steady growth throughout the second half of the 1900s aided by its proximity to the Sacramento metropolitan area and an urban exodus known as white flight from the early 1950s to the mid-1960s.

== Geography ==
Rio Linda is located at 38°41′25″N 121°27′14″W (38.690252, -121.453814). According to the United States Census Bureau, the CDP has a total area of 9.9 square miles (26 km^{2}), all land. The soil type of the area consists primarily of hard pan made up of silted clay and fine sands.

== Nature and wildlife ==
- There is a seed library in Rio Linda. A seed library is a collection of seeds that are available free of charge to all members of the community. Seed-savers are asked to bring some of theirs to these locations' Seed Libraries. With enough heirloom seed donations from the region, there will ultimately be a seed library containing plants ideally suited for Sacramento weather.
- Gibson Ranch Park, near Rio Linda, hosts 325 acres of natural countryside.

== Demographics ==
=== 2020 census ===
As of the 2020 census, Rio Linda had a population of 15,944 and a population density of 1,606.1 inhabitants per square mile (620.1/km^{2}). The median age was 37.1 years. The age distribution was 24.8% under the age of 18, 8.4% aged 18 to 24, 26.6% aged 25 to 44, 25.8% aged 45 to 64, and 14.5% aged 65 or older. For every 100 females there were 101.6 males, and for every 100 females age 18 and over there were 99.2 males age 18 and over.

The census reported that 99.5% of the population lived in households, 0.5% lived in non-institutionalized group quarters, and no one was institutionalized. There were 4,989 households, of which 37.1% had children under the age of 18. Of all households, 52.2% were married-couple households, 8.1% were cohabiting couple households, 22.9% had a female householder with no spouse or partner present, and 16.9% had a male householder with no spouse or partner present. About 17.8% of all households were one-person households, and 8.5% had one person aged 65 or older. The average household size was 3.18, and there were 3,800 families (76.2% of all households).

There were 5,174 housing units at an average density of 521.2 units per square mile (201.2 units/km^{2}), of which 4,989 (96.4%) were occupied. Of occupied units, 74.5% were owner-occupied and 25.5% were occupied by renters. The remaining 3.6% were vacant housing units; the homeowner vacancy rate was 1.1% and the rental vacancy rate was 2.7%.

98.7% of residents lived in urban areas, while 1.3% lived in rural areas.

Racial composition as of the 2020 census
Race	Number	Percent
White	10,085	63.3%
Black or African American	393	2.5%
American Indian and Alaska Native	218	1.4%
Asian	853	5.3%
Native Hawaiian and Other Pacific Islander	80	0.5%
Some other race	2,165	13.6%
Two or more races	2,150	13.5%
Hispanic or Latino (of any race)	4,278	26.8%

=== Demographic estimates ===
In 2023, the US Census Bureau estimated that 16.4% of the population were foreign-born. Of all people aged 5 or older, 71.2% spoke only English at home, 14.0% spoke Spanish, 8.1% spoke other Indo-European languages, 6.4% spoke Asian or Pacific Islander languages, and 0.4% spoke other languages. Of those aged 25 or older, 87.5% were high school graduates and 16.5% had a bachelor's degree.

=== Income and poverty ===
The median household income in 2023 was $96,083, and the per capita income was $37,359. About 7.2% of families and 11.7% of the population were below the poverty line.

=== 2010 census ===
The 2010 United States census reported that Rio Linda had a population of 15,106. The population density was 1,525.3 inhabitants per square mile (588.9/km^{2}). The racial makeup of Rio Linda was 11,654 (77.1%) White, 621 (4.1%) African American, 235 (1.6%) Native American, 665 (4.4%) Asian, 62 (0.4%) Pacific Islander, 1,304 (8.6%) from other races, and 821 (5.4%) from two or more races. Hispanic or Latino people of any race were 3,033 (20.1%).

The Census reported that 15,053 people (99.6% of the population) lived in households, 53 (0.4%) lived in non-institutionalized group quarters, and 0 (0%) were institutionalized.

There were 4,792 households, out of which 1,944 (40.6%) had children under the age of 18 living in them, 2,532 (52.8%) were opposite-sex married couples living together, 753 (15.7%) had a female householder with no husband present, and 345 (7.2%) had a male householder with no wife present. There were 343 (7.2%) unmarried opposite-sex partnerships, and 42 (0.9%) same-sex married couples or partnerships. 843 households (17.6%) were made up of individuals, and 302 (6.3%) had someone living alone who was 65 years of age or older. The average household size was 3.14. There were 3,630 families (75.8% of all households); the average family size was 3.5.

The population was spread out, with 4,087 people (27.1%) under the age of 18, 1,434 people (9.5%) aged 18 to 24, 3,769 people (25%) aged 25 to 44, 4,251 people (28.1%) aged 45 to 64, and 1,565 people (10.4%) who were 65 years of age or older. The median age was 35.9 years. For every 100 females, there were 101 males. For every 100 females age 18 and over, there were 98.5 males.

There were 5,129 housing units at an average density of 517.9 per square mile (200.0/km^{2}), of which 3,475 (72.5%) were owner-occupied, and 1,317 (27.5%) were occupied by renters. The homeowner vacancy rate was 2.8%; the rental vacancy rate was 4.3%. 10,516 people (69.6% of the population) lived in owner-occupied housing units and 4,537 people (30%) lived in rental housing units.

== Politics ==
In the California State Legislature, Rio Linda is in the 8th senatorial district, represented by Democrat Angelique Ashby, and in the 6th Assembly district, represented by Democrat Maggy Krell.

In the United States House of Representatives, Rio Linda is in California's 6th congressional district, represented by Democrat Ami Bera.

Conservative radio host and former Sacramento resident Rush Limbaugh frequently mentioned Rio Linda in a light-hearted chiding manner, both on The Rush Limbaugh Show and in print.

== Recreation and events ==
- Rio Linda is home to the Roy Hayer Memorial Racetrack (formerly known as the Crackerjack Track). This is noted as the first track that four-time NASCAR champion Jeff Gordon ever competed on.
- Rio Linda hosts the northern terminus of the Sacramento Northern Bike Trail. It is a 10-mile-long (16 km) paved pathway that connects the Rio Linda area with Downtown Sacramento. The trail was constructed along the abandoned Sacramento Northern railroad right-of-way which has since served as a commuter connection for cyclists and pedestrians alike.
- A dog park, children's playground, picnic area, walking trails and horse stables are within Gibson Ranch Park, near Rio Linda.
- Depot Park in Rio Linda has a community center with a commercial kitchen, a playground, horseshoe pits, a basketball court, a tennis court, shuffleboard, a parking lot, picnic areas and trail access to the Sacramento Northern Bike Trail.
- Rio Linda Elverta Recreation and Park District is located at 810 Oak Lane. It is a rec center that offers aquatics, adult activities, youth activities and other classes to the local community.
- Rio Linda is home to the privately owned Rio Linda Airport.
- Rio Linda hosts "Farm and Tractor Days", which is held at the Dry Creek Ranch House. Its 23rd annual Farm and Tractor Day was in 2017. This event celebrates farm life.
- Rio Linda hosts the "Rio Linda Elverta Country Faire", an extension of the Rio Linda Centennial Celebration, first celebrated in 2012.

== Education ==
- Orchard Elementary
- Dry Creek Elementary School
- West Side Elementary
- Heritage Peak Charter School
- Rio Linda High School
- Rio Linda Preparatory Academy

== Media ==
Rio Linda has been home to Rio Linda Online, the primary source for community news and information for 20 years.

== Library ==
The Rio Linda library has computers, and a children's area offers toys, puppets, and a small puppet theatre for the children, donated by the active Friends group. Windows look out over a playground and softball field. Entrance to the large parking lot is from 6th Street. The first library in Rio Linda opened on September 26, 1916. The library also features a Seed Library for sharing seeds.

== Notable people ==
- Ken Ackerman, KFBK and KCBS radio announcer, grew up at 22nd and E Streets in Rio Linda
- Sheila Hudson, triple-jump record holder
- Bob Oliver, professional baseball player
- Darren Oliver, professional baseball player
- Chuck Quackenbush, former California Insurance Commissioner, lived in Rio Linda while in office
- Justin E. H. Smith, philosopher and author, lived in Rio Linda 1974–1987
- Cam Skattebo, New York Giants running back, graduated from Rio Linda high school, went on to Arizona State University and played college football there
