= Dana Rivers =

American transgender advocate and murderer

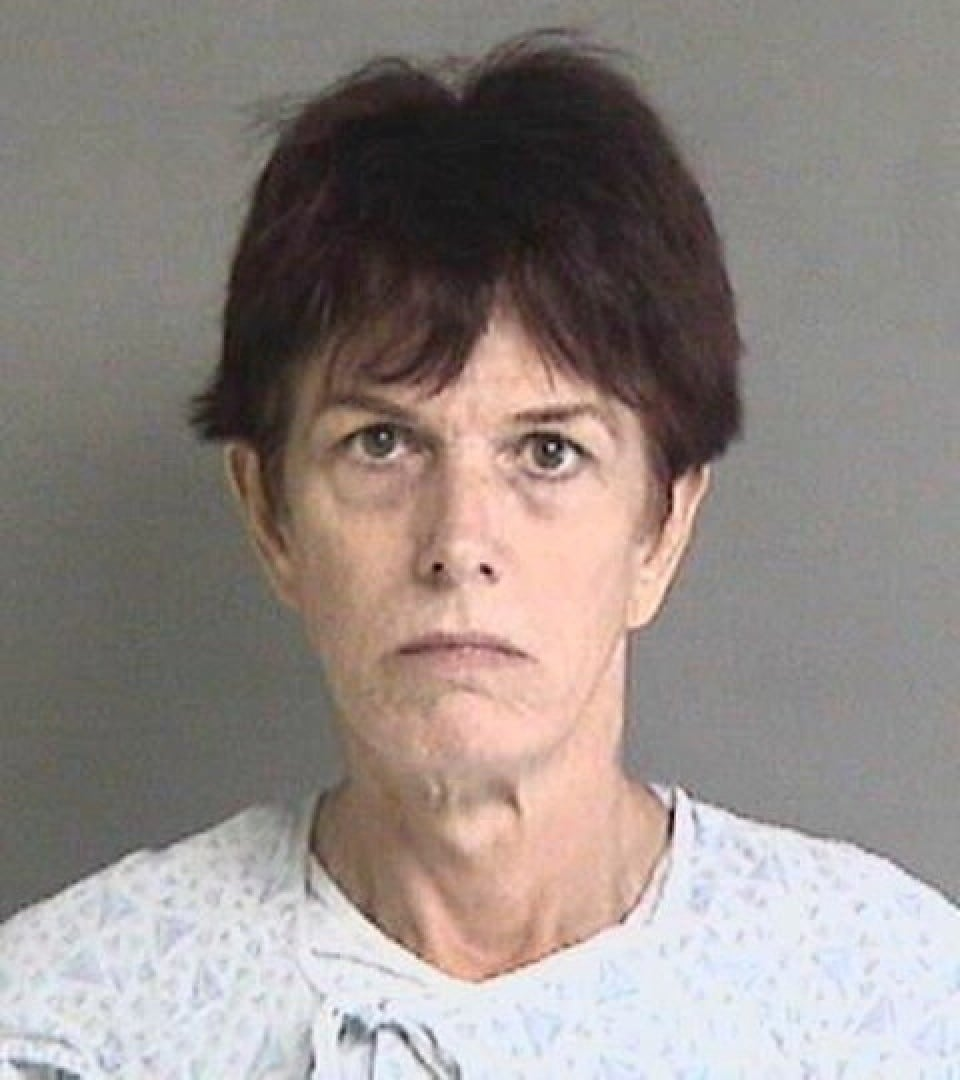
Police mugshot of Dana Rivers by Alameda County Sheriff, California, 11 November 2016.

Dana Rivers (born 1954 or 1955) is an American transgender advocate and convicted murderer.

In 1999, Rivers was fired from her job as a teacher at Center High School in Antelope, California, after she revealed to the school that she soon intended to live her life as a woman. Her subsequent suit brought national attention to the case.

In 2022, Rivers was convicted of the 2016 murders of Charlotte Reed, 56, and her wife Patricia Wright, 57, and their son Benny Diambu-Wright, 19.

== Early life and career ==
Rivers grew up in the San Francisco area. She served three years in the US Navy before pursuing a career in education.

Rivers was a labor leader in Orange County for the American Federation of Teachers, and in the 1980s was twice elected to the board of the Huntington Beach Union High School District. She was also a baseball coach and a white-water rafting instructor.

Rivers had problems with alcoholism and three failed marriages. She was diagnosed with gender dysphoria after moving to Antelope and becoming a teacher in 1990.

== Discrimination case ==
Rivers gained global attention in 1999 when she was fired as a teacher because she came out as a transgender woman to her students at Center High School. Before coming out, she had been recognized as an outstanding teacher by the school. When she started to discuss her transition, she was warned not to discuss such matters at the school, and ultimately the board voted 3–2 to fire her. Rivers sued Center Unified School District for the dismissal; the case was eventually settled out of court, with Rivers agreeing to resign and receiving a $150,000 settlement. She subsequently moved to the Bay Area to resume her teaching career.

== Activism ==
After settling her case, Rivers travelled the country to speak to groups about her experience. In 2004, Rivers appeared on the news magazine program 20/20. She discussed her discrimination case, as well as the gender confirming surgeries she received in 2000.

== Murders and trial ==
On November 11, 2016, married couple Patricia Wright and Charlotte Reed and their nineteen-year-old son, Benny Toto Diambu-Wright, were killed at their house in Oakland, California. Wright and Reed were both stabbed and "riddled with bullets" in their bed, though Reed was stabbed dozens more times than Wright, to the point of being "unrecognizable". Diambu was shot and was found lying in the street after leaving the house. When police arrived at the scene following 911 calls, they found Rivers running from the house, which was on fire, while covered in blood. She was in possession of knives, ammunition, and metal knuckles; when arrested, she "began to make spontaneous statements about her involvement in the murders", according to police.

Rivers was formally charged with three counts of murder, arson, and possession of metal knuckles on November 14, 2016. In 2017, she pleaded not guilty to the charges; in 2018 she was ordered to stand trial on the murder charges. After years of delay, Rivers' jury trial on charges of murder began in late October 2022. The prosecution alleged that, motivated by Reed's exit from the women's motorcycle club they had both been members of, Rivers had gained Reed's trust in order to be allowed to spend the night in her and Wright's home. Rivers then shot the couple to death in their sleep, stabbing the corpses afterwards; she set fire to the garage in an attempt to remove evidence of the crime. On November 16, 2022, a jury found Rivers guilty on all charges. In January 2023, a judge ruled that she had been legally sane at the time of the murders. The same judge later sentenced Rivers to life in prison without the possibility of parole, calling it "the most depraved crime I ever handled in the criminal justice system in 33 years."
