= 1991 San Francisco 49ers season =

American football team season

- Owner: Edward J. DeBartolo Jr.
- General manager: Carmen Policy
- Head coach: George Seifert
- Offensive coordinator: Mike Holmgren
- Defensive coordinator: Bill McPherson
- Home stadium: Candlestick Park

Results
- Record: 10–6
- Division place: 3rd NFC West
- Playoffs: Did not qualify
- Pro Bowlers: G Guy McIntyre; WR Jerry Rice; OLB Charles Haley

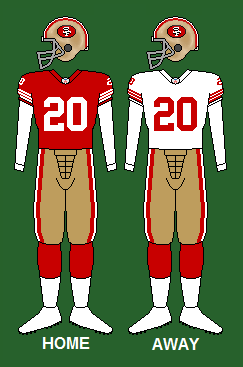
The uniform of the San Francisco 49ers, 1991-1995.

The 1991 San Francisco 49ers season was the franchise's 42nd season in the National Football League (NFL) and their 46th overall. The franchise did not qualify for the postseason for the first time since the strike-shortened 1982 season. Joe Montana would miss the entire season with an elbow injury, paving the way for Steve Young to take over as the team's starting quarterback.

In Week 17, the 49ers found themselves not controlling their destiny. The Atlanta Falcons had already swept the 49ers in 2 very close games in the regular season, and therefore held the tiebreaker in the wild card. The New Orleans Saints had a 10–5 record entering the week, and defeated the Phoenix Cardinals, winning the division.

== Offseason ==
Following the 1990 season, the 49ers left team stalwarts Roger Craig and Ronnie Lott unprotected and allowed them go to the Los Angeles Raiders via Plan B free agency.

In 1991, the 49ers announced a prototype for a new logo and helmet design. Instead of the traditional "SF" oval, this new logo featured a stylized "49ers" in white with black and red shadows. However, fan reaction was so overwhelmingly negative that the idea was scrapped six days later. The only change to the uniform would be the switching from red socks with three white stripes to plain solid red socks.

=== NFL draft ===
1991 San Francisco 49ers draft
Round	Pick	Player	Position	College	Notes
1	25	Ted Washington *	Nose tackle	Louisville	
2	45	Ricky Watters *	Running back	Notre Dame	began play with 49ers in 1992.
2	53	John Johnson	Linebacker	Clemson	
4	95	Mitch Donahue	Linebacker	Wyoming	
5	122	Merton Hanks *	Defensive back	Iowa	
5	137	Harry Boatswain	Guard	New Haven	began play with 49ers in 1992.
6	165	Scott Bowles	Tackle	North Texas	
7	193	Sheldon Canley	Running back	San Jose State	
8	221	Tony Hargain	Wide receiver	Oregon	
9	248	Louis Riddick	Defensive back	Pittsburgh	
10	276	Byron Holdbrooks	Defensive tackle	Alabama	
11	304	Bobby Slaughter	Wide receiver	Louisiana Tech	
12	332	Cliff Confer	Defensive end	Michigan State	
Made roster * Made at least one Pro Bowl during career

== Personnel ==
=== Staff ===
1991 San Francisco 49ers staff
Front office: Owner – Edward J. DeBartolo, Jr.; President – Carmen Policy; Vice president of football administration – John McVay; Administrator of football operations – Neal Dahlen; Administrator of college scouting – Tony Razzano; Administrator of pro personnel – Allan Webb; Executive administrative assistant – Dwight Clark; Head coaches: Head coach – George Seifert; Offensive coaches: Offensive coordinator/quarterbacks – Mike Holmgren; Running backs – Ray Sherman; Receivers – Sherman Lewis; Tight ends/offensive line assistant – Lynn Stiles; Offensive line – Bobb McKittrick	Defensive coaches: Defensive coordinator – Bill McPherson; Defensive line – John Marshall; Linebackers – Bob Zeman; Defensive backs – Ray Rhodes; Defensive assistant – Dwaine Board; Defensive assistant – Tommy Hart; Special teams coaches: Special teams coordinator – Lynn Stiles; Strength and conditioning: Physical development coordinator – Jerry Attaway

=== Roster ===
1991 San Francisco 49ers roster
Quarterbacks (QB): 13 Steve Bono; 14 Bill Musgrave; 8 Steve Young; Running backs (RB): 35 Dexter Carter KR; 30 Keith Henderson; 44 Tom Rathman FB; 24 Harry Sydney FB; 23 Spencer Tillman; Wide receivers (WR): 86 Sanjay Beach PR; 80 Jerry Rice; 88 Mike Sherrard; 82 John Taylor PR; Tight ends (TE): 84 Brent Jones; 89 Wesley Walls; 81 Jamie Williams	Offensive linemen (OL): 79 Harris Barton T; 67 Roy Foster G; 62 Guy McIntyre G; 69 Tom Neville G; 75 Frank Pollack T; 61 Jesse Sapolu C; 60 Chuck Thomas C; 74 Steve Wallace T; Defensive linemen (DL): 96 Dennis Brown DE; 64 Jim Burt NT; 95 Michael Carter NT; 78 Pierce Holt DE; 93 Greg Joelson DE; 91 Larry Roberts DE; 97 Ted Washington NT	Linebackers (LB): 59 Keith DeLong ILB; 54 Mitch Donahue ILB; 98 Antonio Goss OLB; 94 Charles Haley OLB; 92 Tim Harris OLB; 90 Darin Jordan ILB; 53 Bill Romanowski OLB; 99 Michael Walter ILB; Defensive backs (DB): 22 Todd Bowles FS; 29 Don Griffin CB; 36 Merton Hanks CB; 40 Johnnie Jackson FS; 45 Kevin Lewis CB; 43 Dave Waymer SS; 41 David Whitmore SS; Special teams (ST): 6 Mike Cofer K; 4 Joe Prokop P	Practice squad: 56 Martin Harrison LB; 21 Kevin Thompson S; 28 Adam Walker RB; Reserve: 65 Harry Boatswain T (IR); 71 Scott Bowles G (IR); 20 Sheldon Canley RB (IR); 25 Eric Davis CB (IR); 75 Kevin Fagan DE (IR); -- Tony Hargain WR (IR); 55 John Johnson LB (IR); 83 Ron Lewis WR (IR); 16 Joe Montana QB (IR); 26 Darryl Pollard CB (IR); 32 Ricky Watters RB (IR); Rookies in italics 47 active, 11 reserve, 3 practice squad

== Preseason ==
Week	Date	Opponent	Result	Record	Venue	Attendance
1	July 27	at Los Angeles Raiders	W 24–17	1–0	Los Angeles Memorial Coliseum	45,365
2	August 3	vs. Chicago Bears	W 21–7	2–0	Olympiastadion (Berlin)	66,876
3	August 7	Denver Broncos	W 24–6	3–0	Candlestick Park	54,170
4	August 19	San Diego Chargers	W 24–13	4–0	Candlestick Park	53,453
5	August 23	at Seattle Seahawks	W 28–16	5–0	Kingdome	54,111

== Regular season ==
With Joe Montana out for the season with an elbow injury, Steve Young became the starting quarterback. The season opener, a rematch of the previous year's NFC Championship with the New York Giants, was the first road loss suffered by the 49ers since losing at Phoenix in 1988. The loss ended a still-standing NFL record 18 consecutive regular season road game victories spanning the 1988–90 seasons. The first month of the season saw the team inconsistent with alternating home wins and road losses. In week 10 against the Atlanta Falcons, Young suffered a knee injury, causing him to miss five games. With Young out and with the 49ers record at 4–5, Steve Bono led the 49ers to five wins in 6 games. However, Young returned for the final game; a 52–14 victory over the Chicago Bears. Although the 49ers finished the regular season at 10–6, they missed the playoffs for the first time since 1982 (losing on a tie-breaker to the Atlanta Falcons due to having lost both meetings). Young would however win the first of four consecutive passing titles.

=== Schedule ===
Week	Date	Opponent	Result	Record	Venue	Attendance
1	September 2	at New York Giants	**L** 14–16	0–1	Giants Stadium	76,319
2	September 8	San Diego Chargers	**W** 34–14	1–1	Candlestick Park	60,753
3	September 15	at Minnesota Vikings	**L** 14–17	1–2	Hubert H. Humphrey Metrodome	59,148
4	September 22	**Los Angeles Rams**	**W** 27–10	2–2	Candlestick Park	63,871
5	September 29	at Los Angeles Raiders	**L** 6–12	2–3	Los Angeles Memorial Coliseum	91,494
6	Bye					
7	October 13	**Atlanta Falcons**	**L** 34–39	2–4	Candlestick Park	57,343
8	October 20	Detroit Lions	**W** 35–3	3–4	Candlestick Park	61,240
9	October 27	at Philadelphia Eagles	**W** 23–7	4–4	Veterans Stadium	65,796
10	November 3	at **Atlanta Falcons**	**L** 14–17	4–5	Atlanta–Fulton County Stadium	51,259
11	November 10	at **New Orleans Saints**	**L** 3–10	4–6	Louisiana Superdome	68,591
12	November 17	Phoenix Cardinals	**W** 14–10	5–6	Candlestick Park	50,180
13	November 25	at **Los Angeles Rams**	**W** 33–10	6–6	Anaheim Stadium	61,881
14	December 1	**New Orleans Saints**	**W** 38–24	7–6	Candlestick Park	62,092
15	December 8	at Seattle Seahawks	**W** 24–22	8–6	Kingdome	56,711
16	December 14	Kansas City Chiefs	**W** 28–14	9–6	Candlestick Park	62,672
17	December 23	Chicago Bears	**W** 52–14	10–6	Candlestick Park	60,419
Note: Intra-division opponents are in **bold** text.

=== Standings ===
NFC West
	W	L	T	PCT	DIV	CONF	PF	PA	STK
^{(3)} New Orleans Saints	11	5	0	.688	4–2	8–4	341	211	W2
^{(6)} Atlanta Falcons	10	6	0	.625	5–1	7–5	361	338	L1
San Francisco 49ers	10	6	0	.625	3–3	7–5	393	239	W6
Los Angeles Rams	3	13	0	.188	0–6	2–10	234	390	L10

== Awards and records ==
- Steve Young, Led NFL, Passer Rating, 101.8 Rating
