= Fenuki Tupou =

American football player (born 1985)

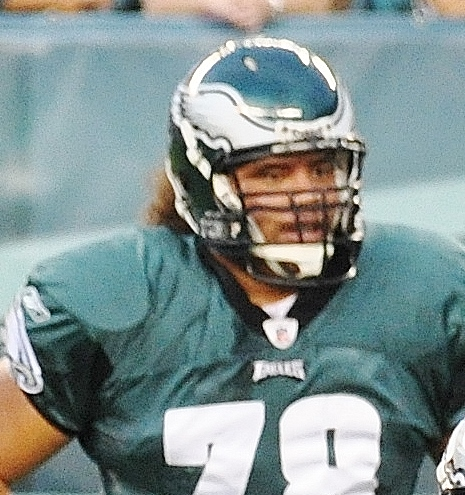
- Tupou with the Philadelphia Eagles in 2009

No. 72, 78
- Position: Guard

Personal information
- Born: May 2, 1985 (age 41); Sacramento, California, U.S.
- Listed height: 6 ft 5 in (1.96 m)
- Listed weight: 314 lb (142 kg)

Career information
- High school: Center (Antelope, California)
- College: Oregon
- NFL draft: 2009: 5th round, 159th overall pick

Career history
- Philadelphia Eagles (2009–2010); New Orleans Saints (2011–2012); Arizona Rattlers (2014)*
- * Offseason or practice squad member only

Awards and highlights
- 2× Second-team All-Pac-10 (2007, 2008)
- Stats at Pro Football Reference

Fenuki Aisea Tupou (born May 2, 1985) is an American former professional football player who was a guard in the National Football League (NFL). He played college football for the Oregon Ducks and was selected by the Philadelphia Eagles in the fifth round of the 2009 NFL draft.

== Early life ==
Tupou was raised in Antelope, California, where he attended Center High School as a two-way lineman. He went on to attend Sierra College for two years, earning a Junior College All-American honorable mention in 2005. Tupou was recruited by Oregon, where he eventually committed. He redshirted in 2006, before starting 23 games at offensive tackle for the Ducks over the course of his junior and senior year, earning All-Pacific-10 honors both seasons.

College recruiting
Name	Hometown	School	Height	Weight	40^{‡}	Commit date
Fenuki Tupou; OG	Antelope, California	Sierra CC	6 ft 6 in (1.98 m)	328 lb (149 kg)	5.1	Dec 16, 2005
Fenuki Tupou; OG	Recruit ratings: Scout: Rivals:					
Overall recruit ranking: Scout: 52 (college recruiting) Rivals: 49 (college recruiting)
‡ Refers to 40-yard dash; Note: In many cases, Scout, Rivals, 247Sports, On3, and ESPN may conflict in their listings of height, weight and 40 time.; In these cases, the average was taken. ESPN grades are on a 100-point scale.; Sources: "2006 Oregon Football Commitment List". Rivals.; "2006 Oregon College Football Team Recruiting Prospects". Scout.; "Scout.com Team Recruiting Rankings". Scout.; "2006 Team Ranking". Rivals.com.

== Professional career ==
Pre-draft measurables
Height	Weight	Arm length	Hand span	40-yard dash	10-yard split	20-yard split	20-yard shuttle	Three-cone drill	Vertical jump	Broad jump	Bench press
6 ft 5 in (1.96 m)	314 lb (142 kg)	34 in (0.86 m)	8 3/4 in (0.22 m)	5.40 s	1.78 s	3.06 s	5.02 s	8.33 s	25 1/2 in (0.65 m)	7 ft 10 in (2.39 m)	24 reps
All values were taken at the NFL Scouting Combine.

=== Philadelphia Eagles ===
Tupou was selected by the Philadelphia Eagles in the fifth round of the 2009 NFL draft with the 159th overall pick. He signed a 4-year contract with the team on June 6, 2009. He was placed on the injured reserve list on September 5, 2009. He was waived on September 4, 2010, and re-signed to the team's practice squad on September 13. His practice squad contract expired at the conclusion of the season, so he was re-signed to a future contract on January 13, 2011.

Tupou was waived on September 3, 2011, during final roster cuts.

=== New Orleans Saints ===
Tupou was signed to the New Orleans Saints practice squad on October 3, 2011. He was re-signed on January 18, 2012. He was waived/injured on August 19, 2012, and subsequently reverted to injured reserve on August 22.

== Personal life ==
His brother, Christian Tupou was a defensive lineman for the USC Trojans. He went undrafted in the 2012 NFL draft, and was signed for training camp by the San Diego Chargers. Their cousin, Viliami Moala, currently plays for the California Golden Bears.
