= Viliami Moala =

American football player (1993–2023)

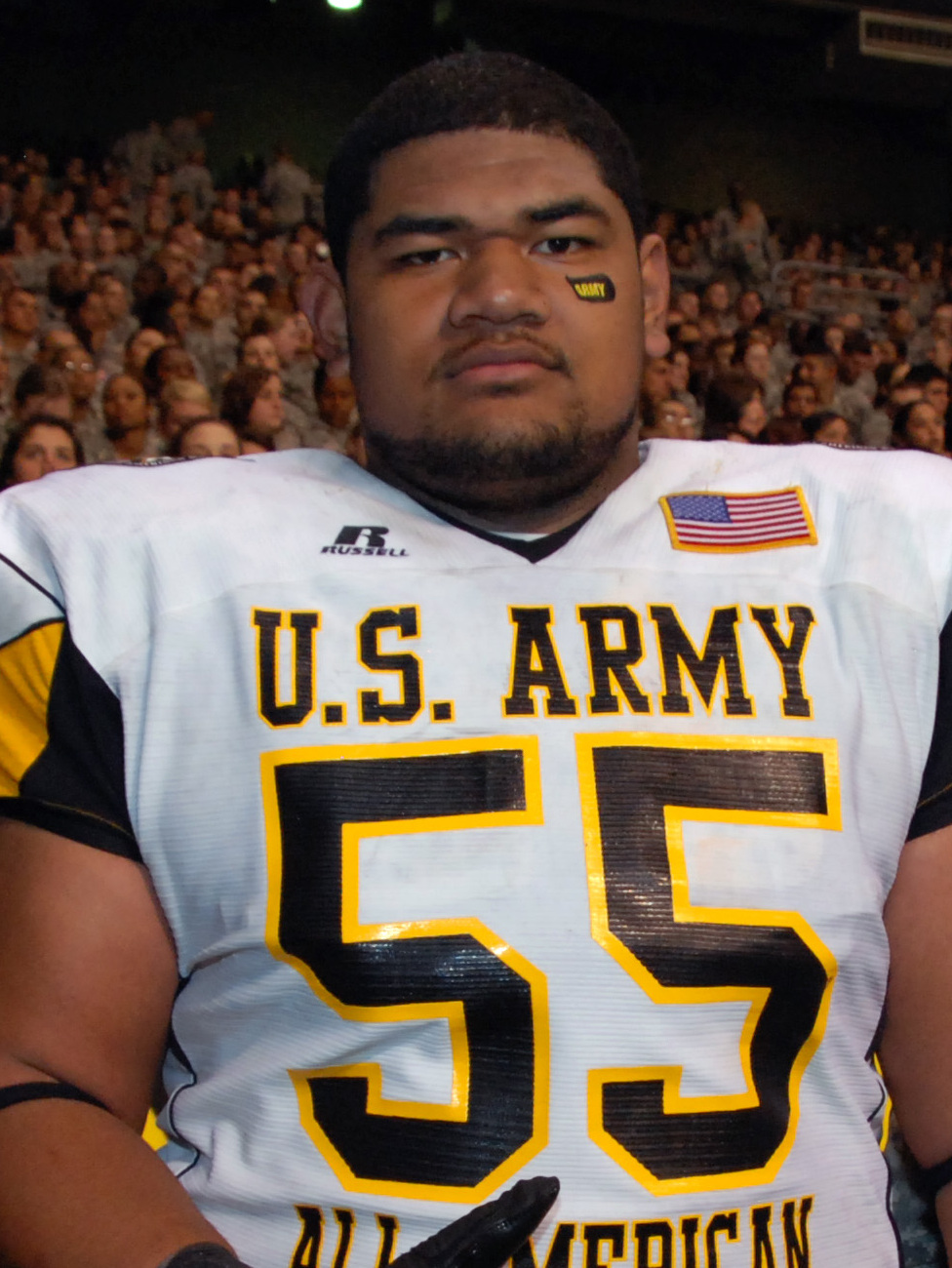
- Moala at the 2011 U.S. Army All-American Bowl

Profile
- Position: Nose tackle

Personal information
- Born: March 30, 1993; Sacramento, California, U.S.
- Died: September 28, 2023 (aged 30)
- Listed height: 6 ft 2 in (1.88 m)
- Listed weight: 315 lb (143 kg)

Career information
- High school: Grant Union (Sacramento, California)
- College: California
- NFL draft: 2014: undrafted

Career history
- Baltimore Ravens (2014)*
- * Offseason or practice squad member only

Viliami Alfred Moala (/ˌvɪliˈɑːmi moʊˈɑːlə/ VIL-ee-AH-mee moh-AH-lə; March 30, 1993 – September 28, 2023) was an American football defensive tackle of Tongan descent. He played college football at California. Moala attended Grant Union High School in Del Paso Heights, Sacramento, California, where he was a consensus All-American defensive lineman.

== Early life ==
"He's a huge kid with thick legs and impossible to move in the middle of a line."

— Greg Biggins of ESPN RISE.

Before high school, Moala did not compete in football. In fact, he was competing in rugby, national sport in his native Tonga. He did, however, attend football games of Grant Union High School, where his older brother Sione was playing. After a game in the 2006 season, Pacers head coach Mike Alberghini spotted Moala in the stands, asking the 300-pounder why he did not play varsity football, only to be stunned to hear that Moala was only 13.

During his freshman year at Grant Union, Moala was not allowed to participate in varsity football, because California Interscholastic Federation (CIF) rules do not allow students under the age of 15 to compete. Moala instead lined-up on the junior varsity, leading the squad to an undefeated record. As a sophomore, in his first year of varsity football, he started at left guard and was a reserve defensive tackle, finishing the year with 55 tackles, 15 tackles for loss, four quarterback sacks, two forced fumbles and two fumble recoveries. In the CIF Open Division state championship against perennial powerhouse Long Beach Poly, Moala helped Grant to a 25–20 upset.

As a junior, Moala tallied 104 tackles, 36 tackles for loss, and 15 sacks, and returned a blocked kick for a touchdown. He played nose tackle in Grant Union's 3–5–3 defense that allowed only 68 points in 13 games, including eight shutouts, and combined for a state-record 77 sacks. However, while riding a 26-game winning streak into the CIF Division II semifinal, Grant Union was upset by Rocklin High School, 19–21. Still, Moala was named California's Junior Player of the Year, the first lineman to do so since Manny Fernandez of San Lorenzo in 1962. By the end of his junior year, Moala had offers from most of the Pacific-10 Conference.

In his senior year, Moala was part of a defense that allowed only 68 points and had eight shutouts, registering a new state-record of 83 sacks (of which Moala contributed 16). Moala also had 131 tackles, five forced fumbles, two fumble recoveries, one interception that he returned 25 yards, three blocked punts and a blocked field goal on the season. Grant Union won 13 consecutive games and was ranked among the top teams in nation until being upset by Folsom High School 41–20 in the Sac-Joaquin Section Division II football championship game. Grant Union had beaten Folsom 49–14 earlier that season, in a national televised (part of the ESPN "Zero Week" series) at Prairie View Stadium.

College recruiting
Name	Hometown	School	Height	Weight	40^{‡}	Commit date
Viliami Moala; DT	Sacramento, CA	Grant Union	6 ft 2 in (1.88 m)	325 lb (147 kg)	5.2	Jan 8, 2011
Viliami Moala; DT	Recruit ratings: Scout: Rivals: (81)					

Regarded as a five-star recruit by Scout.com, Moala is listed as the No. 2 defensive tackle prospect in the class of 2011, behind only Anthony Johnson. He and teammate James Sample were selected to play in the 2011 U.S. Army All-American Bowl. With offers from almost every BCS school, including Alabama, Miami (Fl.), Tennessee, and Florida, Moala was considered Sacramento area's most heavily recruited prospect since Kevin Willhite of Cordova in 1981. He took official visits to Arizona State, Washington, Southern California, and finally California–Berkeley. Moala announced his decision to play for the Golden Bears at the Army All-American Bowl, and has been described by recruiters as the "jewel" of California's 2011 recruiting class.

== College career ==
Moala arrived at California weighing 387 lb (176 kg), but managed to shed almost 70 pounds with a nutrition plan designed specifically for him by Suzanne Nelson, Cal's director of sports performance and nutrition, along with workouts under the supervision of strength and conditioning coach Mike Blasquez. Initially, he was thought to remain in the 350–360 lb (159–163 kg) range, but eventually shed more weight on request of head coach Jeff Tedford. As a true freshman, Moala saw limited action in all 13 games of the 2011 season, recording four tackles (2 solo) for the year. Getting in all of his action off the bench, he was one of only three true freshmen to appear in all Golden Bear games, along with Mustafa Jalil and Richard Rodgers. Moala was also used as one of the backfield blockers in the team's punt game.

In his sophomore season, Moala was a backup to senior Aaron Tipoti and appeared in ten games. In the second game of the season, against Southern Utah, he recorded a tackle for a loss of one yard, and a pass breakup. Moala's best performance came in a game against the then-No.13 USC Trojans at the Los Angeles Memorial Coliseum. Lining up opposite of All-Pac-12 center Khaled Holmes, Moala registered three tackles, including one unassisted.

Moala entered the 2014 NFL draft after his junior season.

== Professional career ==
Moala went undrafted in the 2014 NFL Draft, but was signed for training camp by the Baltimore Ravens.

== Personal life ==
Moala was born to Nauela and Lupe Moala, both natives of Tonga who emigrated to the United States in the early 1980s. Moala has four brothers and a sister. Among his cousins are former Oregon Ducks offensive lineman Fenuki Tupou, and former USC Trojans defensive lineman Christian Tupou. The latter also attended Grant Union High School in Sacramento.

While a senior in high school, Moala bench-pressed 495 pounds (225 kg). Said Jeff Tedford: "He's already got the Cal bench-press record before he even gets here". By 2013, Moala vowed to bench 520 pounds, adding, "That can really bend a bar."

Moala died on September 28, 2023, at the age of 30.
