= Tony Hargain =

American football player (born 1967)

No. 81, 7
- Position: Wide receiver

Personal information
- Born: December 26, 1967 (age 58); Palo Alto, California, U.S.
- Listed height: 6 ft 0 in (1.83 m)
- Listed weight: 194 lb (88 kg)

Career information
- High school: Center (Antelope, California)
- College: Oregon (1987–1990)
- NFL draft: 1991: 8th round, 221st overall pick

Career history
- San Francisco 49ers (1991); Kansas City Chiefs (1992); Los Angeles Rams (1993); San Francisco 49ers (1994)*; Sacramento Gold Miners (1994); Denver Broncos (1996)*; London Monarchs (1997)*
- * Offseason or practice squad member only

Career NFL statistics
- Receptions: 17
- Receiving yards: 205
- Stats at Pro Football Reference

Anthony Michael Hargain (born December 26, 1967) is an American former professional football player who was a wide receiver for one season with the Kansas City Chiefs of the National Football League (NFL). He was selected by the San Francisco 49ers in the eighth round of the 1991 NFL draft. He played college football and basketball for the Oregon Ducks. He also played professionally for the Sacramento Gold Miners of the Canadian Football League (CFL).

== Early life ==
Anthony Michael Hargain was born on December 26, 1967, in Palo Alto, California. He played basketball and football at Center High School in Antelope, California. He averaged 26.2 points per game his senior year in basketball. Hargain was a quarterback in football.

== College career ==
Hargain played college football and basketball for the Ducks of the University of Oregon. He was a three letterman in basketball from 1986–87 to 1988–89. He played in 59 games, starting four, during his college basketball career and averaged 2.3 points per game.

Hargain redshirted for the football team in 1986 and was a four-year letterman from 1987 to 1990. During his redshirt freshman year in 1987, he caught 18 passes for 215 yards and one touchdown while also rushing 16 times for 27 yards. He caught five passes for 49 yards in 1988, 35 passes for 586 yards and four touchdowns in 1989, and ten passes for 206 yards and two touchdowns in 1990. Hargain missed most of his senior year due to a broken kneecap. He also completed one of ten passes for 36 yards and an interception during his college career.

== Professional career ==
Hargain was selected by the San Francisco 49ers in the eighth round, with the 221st overall pick, of the 1991 NFL draft. He was placed on the reserve/non-football illness list on August 28, 1991, and missed the entire season. He became a free agent after the 1991 season.

Hargain signed with the Kansas City Chiefs on April 1, 1992. He played in 12 games for the Chiefs during the 1992 season, catching 17 passes for 205 yards on 29 targets. He also appeared in one playoff game, recording two receptions for 46 yards on seven targets. Hargain was released on August 24, 1993.

Hargain was claimed off waivers by the Los Angeles Rams on August 25, 1993. He was released on August 30, re-signed on August 31, released again on September 22, re-signed again on September 29, and released for the final time on September 30, 1993. He did not play in any games for the Rams during the 1993 season.

Hargain signed with the San Francisco 49ers on June 1, 1994. He was released on July 21, 1994.

Hargain was signed by the Sacramento Gold Miners of the Canadian Football League on July 30, 1994. He dressed in 13 games for the Gold Miners during the 1994 season and caught 39 passes for 617 yards. He made $51,000 while with the Gold Miners.

Hargain signed with the Denver Broncos in February 1996. He was waived on August 25, 1996.

In February 1997, Hargain was selected by the London Monarchs of the World League of American Football (WLAF) in the fifth round, with the 29th overall pick, of the 1997 WLAF draft. He was waived by the Monarchs in late March 1997.

== Personal life ==
Hargain later founded Hustlin USA Clothing Company.
