= C. J. Wallace =

C. J. Wallace may refer to:

- C. J. Wallace (American football) (born 1985), American football player
- C. J. Wallace (actor) (born 1996), American actor and rapper
- Judson Wallace (born 1982), American basketball player also known as C. J. Wallace
