= Roseville Joint Union High School District =

School district in California, United States

Address
- 1750 Cirby Way Roseville, California, 95661; United States

District information
- Type: Public
- Grades: K–12
- NCES District ID: 0633630

Students and staff
- Students: 10,627
- Teachers: 472.73 (FTE)
- Staff: 438.96 (FTE)
- Student–teacher ratio: 22.48

Other information
- Website: www.rjuhsd.us

Roseville Joint Union High School District is a California school district that consists of six comprehensive high schools, one independent study high school, one continuation high school and an adult school. The district covers most of the city of Roseville and the unincorporated community of Granite Bay, two suburbs of Sacramento that are located in Placer County, and the eastern side of the suburb of Antelope in northern Sacramento County (east of Walerga Road).

The district administration consists of (as of the 2026-2027 academic year): John Becker (Superintendent), Joe Landon (Assistant Superintendent, Business Services), Rob Hasty (Assistant Superintendent, Human Resources), Melanie Dopson (Assistant Superintendent, Student Services), and Amy Black (Assistant Superintendent, Education Services).

== History ==
In 2003 Center Unified School District gave territory to Roseville JUHSD and Dry Creek Joint Elementary School District.

== Schools ==
API scores can be as high as 1,000 and the target score for California schools is 800. Each schools statewide ranking is from 1 (lowest achieving school) to 10 (highest achieving school). All demographic information is as of the 2007-2008 school year. All API test scores are 2010 growth scores as per the State of California's API database.

- Granite Bay High School is located in Granite Bay, a wealthy suburb. GBHS has 2,099 students. GBHS is the highest achieving school in the district with an API score of 845. It has met all schoolwide and subgroup API targets for 2010. The school is 80% Caucasian, 8% Asian, 7% Multiple or No Response 4% Hispanic, and 1% African American.

Principals: Amber Clark (2021–present), Jennifer Leighton (2014-2021), Michael McGuire (2006-2014), Ron Severson (1996-2006, inaugural principal).

- Woodcreek High School is located in Roseville. It has 2,057 students. It is the second highest achieving school in the district with an API score of 827. It has met all schoolwide and subgroup API targets for 2010. The school is 71% White, 9% Hispanic, 8% Asian, 8% Multiple or No Response and 3% African American.

Principals: Suanne Bell (2019–present), Becky Guzman (2016-2019), Jess Borjon (2003-2016), and Christine Minero (1994-2003, inaugural principal).

- Oakmont High School is located in Roseville. It has 2,261 students. Its API score is 822. It has met all schoolwide and subgroup API targets for 2010. The school is 65% White, 11% Multiple or No Response, 9% Asian, 8% Hispanic, and 6% African American.

Principals: Dr. Isabel Govea (2021–present), Robert Hasty (2011-2021), Kathleen Sirovy (2002-2011)

- Roseville High School is also located in Roseville. It has 2,131 students. Its API score is 798 which places it just 2 points away from the 800 benchmark set for all California schools. It has met all schoolwide and subgroup API targets for 2010. The school is 65% White, 17% Hispanic, 8% Asian, 6% Multiple or No Response and 3% African American.

Principals: Dr. Nicholas Richter (2019–present), David Byrd (2014-2019), W. Brad Basham (2006-2014), John Montgomery (1988-2006)

- Antelope High School is located in the northern Sacramento County community of Antelope which demographically speaking is more diverse on the whole than Granite Bay or Roseville. Its API score is 791. It has met schoolwide however it has not met all subgroup targets for 2010 as test scores for socioeconomically disadvantaged students went down by thirteen points while state goals mandated that they should have gone up by at least five points. Antelope High School opened up for 9th and 10th grade students at the beginning of the 2008-2009 school year. The school had its first graduating class in 2011.

Principals: Tino Guzman (2018–present, John Becker (2008-2018, inaugural principal)

- Independence High School is located in Roseville. It offers an Independent Study Program, and will establish a Middle College Program beginning in Fall 2022. IHS also has several CTE programs. Independence High School launched in 1986 as a district program. In 1991, it formally became an alternative high school within Roseville Joint Union High School District. In 2001 IHS moved to its current facility.

Principal: Ross Fernandes (2020–present), Debra Latteri (2009-2020), Rick Matteoli (2007-2009), Ona Castaneda (1991-2007, inaugural principal)

- West Park High School is located in West Roseville. It opened in August 2020 serving the 9th and 10th grades, and expanded to 11th in the 2021-2022 School Year and 12th grade in the 2022-2023 School Year as students from the first year advanced. The school had its first graduating class in 2023. The school is 42% White, 15% Hispanic, 38% Asian, 5% African American, 0.5% Pacific Islander, 1% American Indian or Alaska Native, 3% Multiple, and 0.9% No Response.

Principal: Becky House (2020–present, inaugural principal)

== The Board of Trustees ==
The Board of Trustees for the Roseville Joint Union High School District is currently made up of the following elected individuals: Mr. Pete Constant (President, Term expires 2026), Ms. Tiffany Coleman (Member, Term expires 2024), Ms. Heidi J. Hall (Vice President, Term expires 2024), Vacant (Member, Term expires 2024), and Ms. Marla Franz (Clerk, Term expires 2026).

== See also ==
- Adelante High School
