= Kameron Warrens =

American basketball player (born 2000)

No. 24 – Oklahoma City Blue
- Position: Shooting guard / small forward
- League: NBA G League

Personal information
- Born: February 22, 2000 (age 26) Antelope, California, U.S.
- Listed height: 6 ft 5 in (1.96 m)
- Listed weight: 205 lb (93 kg)

Career information
- High school: Antelope (Antelope, California)
- College: Yuba (2018–2020); Mary (2020–2023)
- NBA draft: 2023: undrafted
- Playing career: 2024–present

Career history
- 2024–2026: Maine Celtics
- 2026: Niagara River Lions
- 2026–present: Oklahoma City Blue

Kameron Isaiah Warrens (born February 22, 2000) is an American professional basketball player for the Oklahoma City Blue of the NBA G League.

== Early life and education ==
Warrens was born February 22, 2000. He grew up in Antelope, California. After graduating from Antelope High School, he attended Yuba College, then the University of Mary.

== College career ==
Warrens played college basketball at Yuba Community College and University of Mary.

He began his college career at the community college level at Yuba in California in 2018. Through his freshman and sophomore seasons, Warren averaged 7.5 points and 5.3 rebounds per game.

For his junior season, Warrens transferred to the University of Mary, an NCAA Division II program in North Dakota. With the Marauders he averaged 4.5 points per game in his junior season. He averaged 8.7 points, 6.1 rebounds, and 1.9 assists as a senior. In his fifth year, he averaged 12.8 points, 5.7 rebounds, and 2.4 assists.

== Professional career ==
Warrens went undrafted in the 2023 NBA Draft. Warrens began his professional career with the Maine Celtics of the NBA G League. In the 2024-25 season, Warrens appeared in 22 games, averaging 4.1 points per game.

For the 2025-26 season, Warrens was named to the Celtics' opening night roster. On November 23, 2025, Warrens scored a career-high 22 points with five three pointers in Maine's win over the Delaware Blue Coats.
