= Michael Wortham =

American football player (born 2002)

No. 15 – Jacksonville Jaguars
- Position: Wide receiver
- Roster status: Practice squad

Personal information
- Born: June 27, 2002 (age 24); North Highlands, California, U.S.
- Listed height: 5 ft 9 in (1.75 m)
- Listed weight: 190 lb (86 kg)

Career information
- High school: Center High School (Antelope, California)
- College: Sierra (2021–2022); Eastern Washington (2023–2024); Montana (2025)
- NFL draft: 2026: undrafted

Career history
- Jacksonville Jaguars (2026–present)*
- * Offseason or practice squad member only

Awards and highlights
- 2x First-team FCS All-American (2024, 2025)
- Stats at Pro Football Reference

Michael Wortham (born June 27, 2002) is an American professional football wide receiver for the Jacksonville Jaguars of the National Football League (NFL). He played college football at Sierra College, Eastern Washington, and Montana.

== Early life ==
Wortham attended Center High School in Antelope, California. During his high school career, he totaled 5,500 all-purpose yards and 72 touchdowns. Coming out of high school, Wortham committed to play college football at the JUCO level for Sierra College.

== College career ==
=== Sierra College ===
During his freshman season in 2021, Wortham served as the backup quarterback, attempting 15 passes. He took over as the starting quarterback in 2022, throwing for 2,180 yards and 17 touchdowns, while also rushing for 845 yards and 13 touchdowns on 133 carries.

=== Eastern Washington ===
Wortham transferred to play for the Eastern Washington Eagles. During his two seasons as an Eagle from 2023 to 2024, he completed 11 of 16 passes for 126 yards and three touchdowns, rushed for 582 yards with 10 touchdowns and hauled in 30 receptions for 266 yards and a touchdown. He also set the school record with 1,093 return yards in 2024. During his time he earned first-team all-Big Sky honors and second-team FCS all-American honors. After the conclusion of the 2024 season, Wortham entered his name into the NCAA transfer portal.

=== Montana ===
Wortham transferred to play for the Montana Grizzlies. In week 5 of the 2025 season, he recorded 164 all-purpose yards and two touchdowns in a win versus Idaho. In week 9, Wortham notched 222 all-purpose yards and three touchdowns in a victory over Sacramento State. He finished the 2025 season with 85 receptions for 1,224 yards and ten touchdowns, 345 rushing yards, and 862 return yards. His 2,265 all-purpose yards set the school record in a single season. Wortham earned first-team all-Big Sky honors and first-team all-American honors. He also finished as a finalist for the Walter Payton Award. After the season, Wortham declared for the 2026 NFL draft, and accepted an invitation to the 2026 East-West Shrine Bowl.

== Professional career ==
Pre-draft measurables
Height	Weight	Arm length	Hand span	Wingspan	40-yard dash	10-yard split	20-yard split	20-yard shuttle	Three-cone drill	Vertical jump	Broad jump
5 ft 8 1/2 in (1.74 m)	181 lb (82 kg)	29 5/8 in (0.75 m)	9 7/8 in (0.25 m)	5 ft 9 1/2 in (1.77 m)	4.50 s	1.60 s	2.60 s	4.19 s	6.84 s	37.5 in (0.95 m)	10 ft 2 in (3.10 m)
All values from Pro Day

On April 26, 2026, Wortham signed with the Jacksonville Jaguars as an undrafted free agent. On August 30, Wortham was waived by Jacksonville as a part of final roster cuts; he was re-signed to the team's practice squad the following day.
