= Antelope High School =

Coordinates: 38.71050°N 121.35634°W

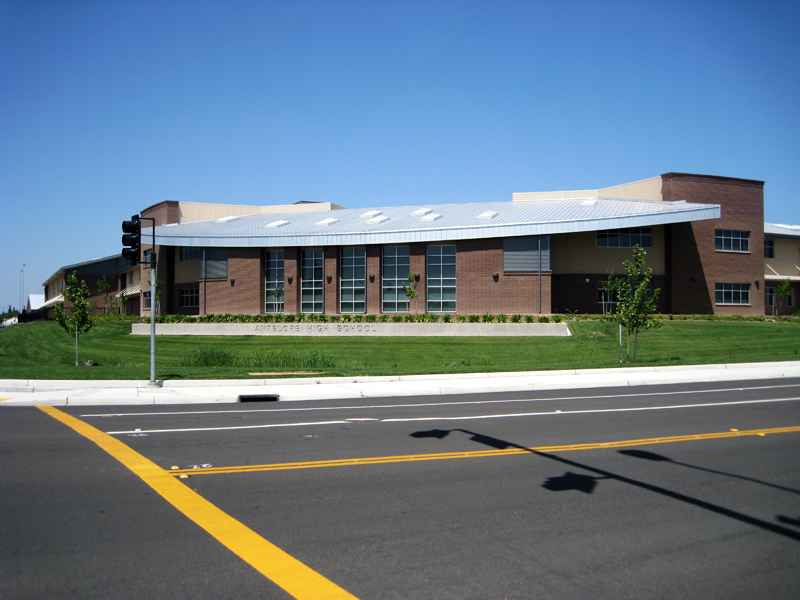

Location
- 7801 Titan Drive; Antelope, California 95843; United States

Information
- Type: Public secondary
- Established: 2007
- School district: Roseville Joint Union High School District
- Principal: Lindsey Cutts
- Teaching staff: 75.48 (on an FTE basis)
- Grades: 9–12
- Enrollment: 1,796 (2023-2024)
- Student to teacher ratio: 23.79
- Colors: Scarlet and Gray
- Mascot: Big Red
- Newspaper: The Titan Times
- Yearbook: Titanium
- Website: antelope.rjuhsd.us

Antelope High School is one of the five high schools in the Roseville Joint Union High School District. The school is located at 7801 Titan Drive, in Antelope, California, United States.

Antelope High School opened up for 9th and 10th grade students at the beginning of the 2008–2009 school year. From the year of 2010- all grade levels were embarked. Class of 2011 Antelope students had attended Oakmont High School or Center High School. The Class of 2011 was the first graduating class.

== The Titan Times ==
The Titan Times, the school's newspaper, was awarded a Silver Crown award by the Columbia Scholastic Press Association.

== Notable alumni ==
- Elijah Dotson (2017), NFL running back for the Atlanta Falcons
- Coleman Hawkins (attended), basketball player
- Benji Kikanovic, MLS player for the San Jose Earthquakes
- Kameron Warrens, basketball player
