= Center Joint Unified School District =

School district in California, United States

Address
- 8408 Watt Avenue Antelope, California, 95843; United States

District information
- Type: Public
- Grades: K–12
- NCES District ID: 0607900

Students and staff
- Students: 4,162 (2020–2021)
- Teachers: 187.0 (FTE)
- Staff: 258.95 (FTE)
- Student–teacher ratio: 22.26:1

Other information
- Website: www.centerusd.org

Center Joint Unified School District (CJUSD) is a school district, located at the northern edge of Sacramento County, California, in the town of Antelope. It was founded in 1858. There are two high schools (Center High School and McClellan High School), one middle school (Wilson Riles Middle School), and five elementary schools (Dudley Elementary, North Country Elementary, Oak Hill Elementary, Rex Fortune Elementary, and Spinelli Elementary).

Center High is the primary high school for the district, while McClellan is designated as an alternative school, intended to help at-risk students graduate.

The current superintendent is Scott Loehr.

In 2003 Center USD gave territory to Roseville Joint Union High School District and Dry Creek Joint Elementary School District.
