= Adelante High School =

Public school in Roseville, California, United States

Coordinates: 38.7526791°N 121.2799502°W

Location
- 350 Atlantic St; Roseville, California 95678; United States

Information
- Type: Public Secondary
- School district: Roseville Joint Union High School District
- Principal: Amy Lloyd
- Teaching staff: 8.62 (FTE)
- Grades: 10th–12th
- Enrollment: 105 (2023–2024)
- Student to teacher ratio: 12.18
- Color: Purple White Black
- Mascot: Warrior
- Accreditation: WASC
- Website: https://www.rjuhsd.us/site/Default.aspx?PageID=211

Adelante High School is one of seven high schools in the Roseville Joint Union High School District in Roseville, Placer County, California. Established in 1965, Adelante High School had only eight students and one instructor and occupied a single room of the Roseville City District's Atlantic Street School. The following year, Adelante moved to the Placer County Fairgrounds where the program grew steadily as the demand for alternative education grew. In 1980 with over 200 students and ten teachers, Adelante moved back to its birthplace, the Atlantic Street School, this time as the sole occupants.
