= West Park High School =

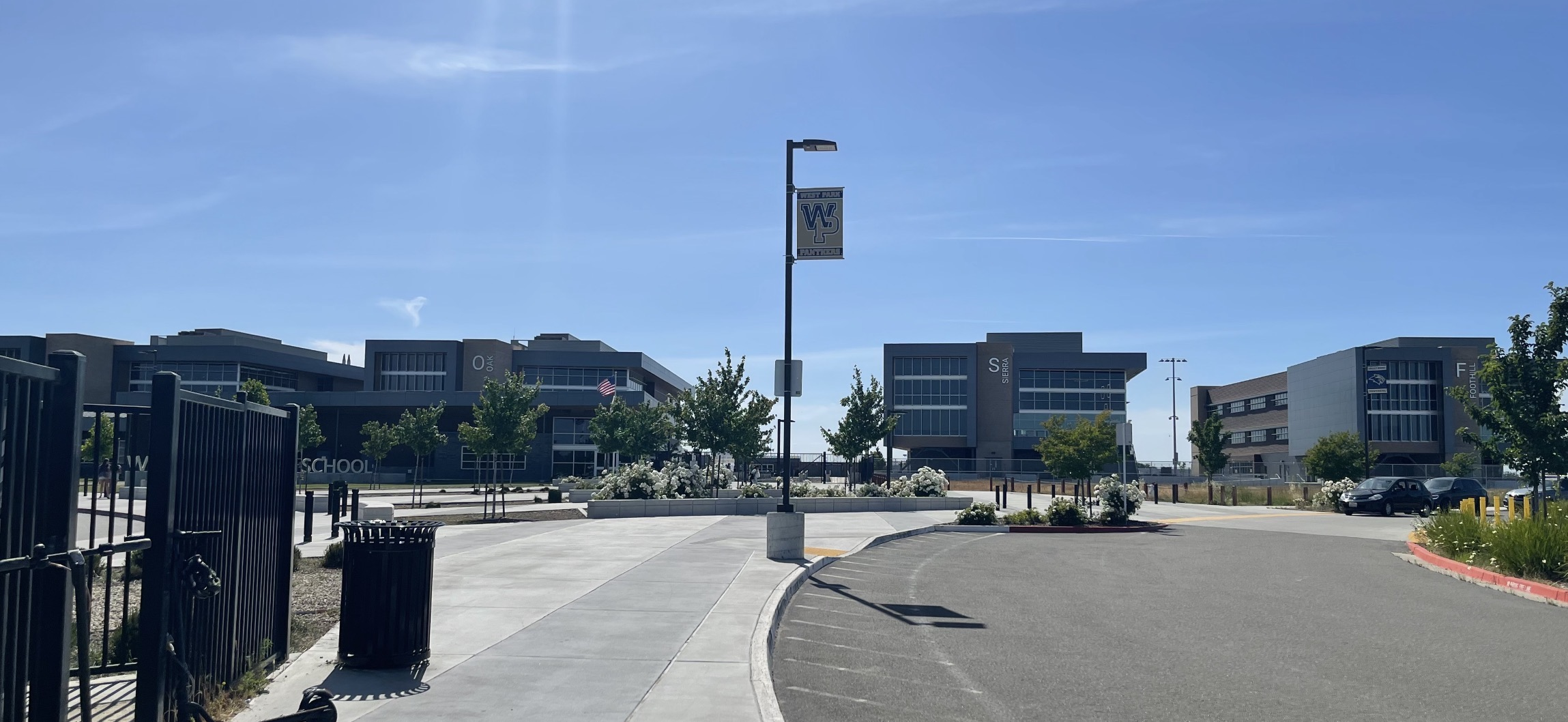

Location
- 2401 Panthers Pl. Roseville, California 95747; United States; 38.78529°N 121.37281°W

Information
- Type: Public
- Established: 2020
- School district: Roseville Joint Union High School District
- Grades: 9–12
- Enrollment: 2,400 (2023–2024)
- Student to teacher ratio: 25.46
- Colors: Navy, Gold
- Mascot: Panthers
- Nickname: Parker The Panther
- Rival: Woodcreek High School
- Newspaper: West Park TV (news broadcast)
- Website: westpark.rjuhsd.us

West Park High School is an American public high school located at 2401 Panther Place in Roseville, California, United States. The school was established in 2020 and serves grades 9–12. It is the newest of the six comprehensive high schools of the Roseville Joint Union High School District.

== History ==
The land for West Park High School was purchased by the Roseville Joint Union High School District in 2011, and voters approved the bond measure funding its construction in 2016. Becky Rood-Guzman was announced as the school's founding principal in 2019. The school opened for the 2020–21 school year, initially enrolling only freshmen and sophomores. All four grade levels were present on campus by the 2022–23 school year, and West Park graduated its first senior class in June 2023. Liz Sisson was approved by the school board to become the school's principal beginning with the 2026–27 school year.

Due to rapid residential development in west Roseville, West Park High School has faced overcrowding pressures. District projections presented in spring 2026 estimated enrollment could approach 3,200 students by the 2028–29 school year. To manage capacity, the Roseville Joint Union High School District board approved district‑wide attendance boundary changes in May 2026, reassigning several neighborhoods beginning in 2027–28.

Total enrollment grew to 2,386 students by the 2025–26 school year, according to California Department of Education enrollment data.

Total enrollment, 2020–21 to 2025–26
School year	Enrollment	Growth (YoY)
2020–21	575	—
2021–22	1,013	76.2%
2022–23	1,498	47.9%
2023–24	1,845	23.2%
2024–25	2,079	12.7%
2025–26	2,386	14.8%

== Academics ==
West Park High School's current graduation rate is 98%, and West Park High School scored 33.5/100 on the college readiness scale.

== Demographics ==
As of the 2025–26 school year, West Park High School enrolled 2,386 students. The racial and ethnic composition of the student body was as follows:

2025–26 enrollment by race/ethnicity and grade
Group	Grade 9	Grade 10	Grade 11	Grade 12	Total	Percent
White	267	207	227	190	891	37.3%
Hispanic or Latino	105	105	101	68	379	15.9%
Asian	97	85	96	92	370	15.5%
Filipino	79	75	71	81	306	12.8%
Two or more races	81	74	46	13	214	9.0%
African American	35	16	23	29	103	4.3%
Not reported	27	25	33	6	91	3.8%
Pacific Islander	5	1	4	7	17	0.7%
American Indian or Alaska Native	3	2	2	8	15	0.6%
Total	699	590	603	494	2,386	100%

Of the 2,386 students enrolled in 2025–26, 812 (34.0%) were classified as socioeconomically disadvantaged, 150 (6.3%) as English learners, 138 (5.8%) as students with disabilities, and 26 (1.1%) as homeless youth; one student was identified under the Migrant Education program, and none were identified as foster youth.

=== Assessment results ===
On the 2024–25 California Assessment of Student Performance and Progress (CAASPP), 70.62% of tested students met or exceeded the standard in English language arts, and 46.09% met or exceeded the standard in mathematics.

2024–25 CAASPP achievement levels
Level	English language arts	Mathematics
Standard Exceeded (Level 4)	38.48%	20.30%
Standard Met (Level 3)	32.14%	25.79%
Standard Nearly Met (Level 2)	12.68%	22.62%
Standard Not Met (Level 1)	16.70%	31.29%

=== Graduation rate ===
The overall four-year graduation rate for the class measured in 2024–25 was 96.1%. Graduation rates varied by subgroup:

Graduation rate by student group, 2024–25
Student group	Students in cohort	Graduates	Graduation rate
All students	440	423	96.1%
Black or African American	22	22	100.0%
Filipino	74	73	98.6%
Asian	95	93	97.9%
White	173	168	97.1%
Socioeconomically disadvantaged	179	170	95.0%
Hispanic or Latino	45	42	93.3%
Students with disabilities	37	29	78.4%
Two or more races	14	11	78.6%
English learners	35	27	77.1%

== Athletics ==
West Park's athletic teams compete in the CIF Sac-Joaquin Section as members of the Metropolitan League. Sports offered include football, baseball, softball, volleyball, basketball, and flag football, among others. The varsity football team has reached the CIF Sac-Joaquin Section playoffs in multiple seasons, including 2024 and 2025.
