= Independence High School (Roseville, California) =

Location
- 125 Berry St. Roseville, Placer County, California; United States
- Coordinates: 38.75764°N 121.27545°W

Information
- Type: Public Secondary
- Established: 1991
- School district: Roseville Joint Union High School District
- Principal: Ross Fernandes
- Teaching staff: 16.05 (FTE)
- Grades: 9th – 12th
- Enrollment: 250 (2023-2024)
- Student to teacher ratio: 15.58
- Color: Red, Black, and White
- Mascot: Trailblazer
- National ranking: 3546
- Website: Main page

Independence High School is one of eight high schools in Roseville Joint Union High School District. The school is located in Roseville.

== IHS Programs ==
Independence High School offers an Independent Study program, and will open a Middle College Program in Fall 2022. Independence High School is part of the Roseville Pathways program within Roseville Joint Union High School District, which offers a variety of alternative education programs. IHS also offers many Career Technical Education (CTE) Pathways. Students at Independence earn an A-G high school diploma, and are able to take classes at Sierra Community College as a component of their high school coursework. IHS students attend school on a flexible schedule and complete some classes online.

=== IHS History ===
Independence High School launched in 1986 as a district program. In 1991, it formally became an alternative high school within Roseville Joint Union High School District.

In 2001 IHS moved to its current facility, creating a space for flexible instruction and independent study, office spaces for staff and classrooms for students.

=== Past Principals ===
Ona Castaneda (1991-2007)

Rick Matteoli (2007-2009)

Debra Latteri (2009-2020)
