= Grant Union High School (Sacramento, California) =

Location
- 1400 Grand Avenue; Sacramento, Sacramento County, California 95838; United States; 38.636231°N 121.434960°W

Information
- Type: Public
- Opened: 1932
- School district: Twin Rivers Unified School District
- Principal: Darris Hinson
- Teaching staff: 95.72 (FTE)
- Grades: 9–12
- Enrollment: 2,016 (2023–2024)
- Student to teacher ratio: 21.06
- Colors: Royal blue and gold
- Mascot: Pacer
- Website: https://ghs.twinriversusd.org/

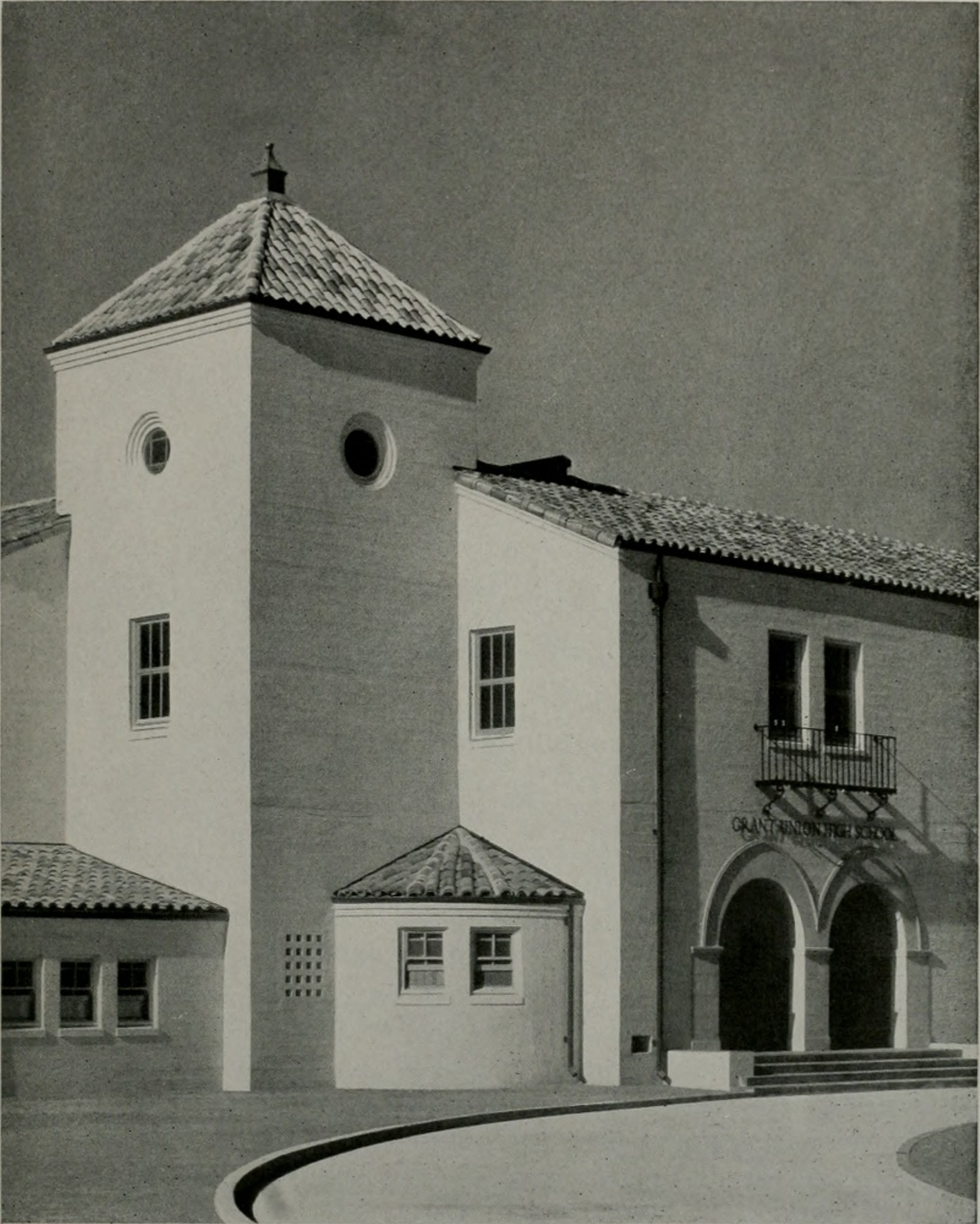
Grant Union High School in the early 1900s

Grant Union High School is a public high school located in the neighborhood of Del Paso Heights in north Sacramento, California, in the United States. The school was founded in September 1932, and is Sacramento’s third-oldest high school. Its building was listed on the National Register of Historic Places in 2026.

In the school's first three years, classes were held in portables. Grant received funding from the Public Works Administration for the construction of its community pool, football stadium, and first building. It also installed a pipe organ, which was first played by student George Wright, who became an organist. The school’s pool, open to the general public outside of school hours, was renovated in 2017.

As of 2025, the total minority enrollment at the school was 95%, and 91% of the students were economically disadvantaged, with 83% receiving the free lunch program.

The school's football team won state titles in 2008, 2022, and 2024.

== Timeline ==
- 1932 – School opens
- 1942 – Creates Grant Technical School as an aeronautical training addition to the high school to aid in World War II (becomes Grant Technical College in 1945)
- 2005 – The new Grant Union High School stadium opens
- 2022 - New Grant Union High Sport Complex

== Notable alumni ==
- Ken Ackerman (1922–2017), radio announcer, disc jockey, and news anchor
- Devontae Booker (born 1992), NFL running back
- Robert Brookins (1962–2009), singer, songwriter, producer, and musician
- Leon Brown (born 1948), Major League baseball outfielder for the New York Mets
- Don Doll (1926–2010), NFL player (safety, return specialist) and coach; NFL kickoff return yards leader
- Gene Filipski (1931–1994), NFL halfback
- Aaron Garcia (born 1970), Arena Football League quarterback
- Carl Granderson (born 1996), NFL defensive end
- Trayvon Henderson (born 1995), NFL safety
- Milt Jackson (1943–2005), NFL coach
- Grantland Johnson (1948–2014), Secretary of California's Health and Human Services Agency
- Ricky Jordan (born 1965), Major League baseball first baseman
- David Kilson (born 1960), NFL defensive back
- Leron Lee (born 1948), Major League baseball left fielder
- Kingston Lopa, college football safety for the California Golden Bears
- Viliami Moala (1993–2023), defensive tackle
- Omarr Norman-Lott (born 2002), NFL defensive tackle
- Cameron Oliver (born 1996), basketball power forward/center in the Israeli Basketball Premier League
- Wayshawn Parker, college football running back
- James Sample (born 1992), NFL safety
- Onterrio Smith (born 1980), NFL running back
- Donté Stallworth (born 1980), NFL wide receiver
- Shaq Thompson (born 1994), NFL linebacker
- Syd'Quan Thompson (born 1987), football cornerback
- Walt Torrence (1937–1969), college basketball guard
- Christian Tupou (born 1989), football defensive end
- Reggie Walker (born 1986), NFL linebacker
- C.J. Wallace (born 1985), NFL safety
- Paris Warren (born 1985), NFL safety
- Worrell Williams (born 1982), football wide receiver
- George Wright (1920–1998), musician
