= Donald J. Butz =

United States Air Force general (1933–2016)

Donald J. Butz (July 6, 1933 – August 1, 2016) was a major general in the United States Air Force.

== Life and career ==
Butz was born in Nevada City, California on July 6, 1933. He graduated from Christian Brothers High School in Sacramento, California, before attending Yuba College, Chico State College, the University of California, Berkeley and the School of Dentistry at Saint Louis University.

Butz joined the Air Force in 1959 and was stationed at Misawa Air Base in Japan in October of that year. In 1962, he returned to the United States and was assigned to Vandenberg Air Force Base. He was later assigned to Robins Air Force Base before becoming an instructor and course supervisor at Sheppard Air Force Base.

From 1973 to 1978, he was assigned to the Office of the Surgeon General of the United States Air Force. He then transferred to Headquarters United States Air Forces in Europe. In 1979, he returned to the Office of the Surgeon General before transferring to Headquarters Tactical Air Command in 1982.

Butz was named Assistant Surgeon General for Dental Services in the Office of the Surgeon General in 1987. He would retire in 1993.

Awards he received include the Legion of Merit with oak leaf cluster, the Meritorious Service Medal with oak leaf cluster, the Air Force Commendation Medal, the Outstanding Unit Award, the Organizational Excellence Award and the National Defense Service Medal.

Butz died on August 1, 2016, at the age of 83.
