= Yuba Community College District =

- Yuba College (main campus) 2088 North Beale Road, Marysville, California; Clear Lake Campus, 15880 Dam Road Ext., Clearlake, California; Woodland Community College, 2300 E. Gibson Road, Woodland, California

Information
- Type: Two-year community college district
- Established: 1927
- Enrollment: 13,000
- Website: www.yccd.edu

Yuba Community College District is a community college district with a flagship campus, Yuba College, in Marysville, California, United States. It has a second college, Woodland Community College in the county seat of Yolo County, California which was accredited for the first time in 2008

The Yuba Community College District's two colleges are accredited by the Western Association of Schools and Colleges. Both colleges are recognized as fully accredited two-year community colleges by the University of California, the California Community Colleges, and the United States Department of Education.
