= Woodland Community College =

Public college in Woodland, California, US

Coordinates: 38°39′37.19″N 121°44′8.44″W

- Type: Public community college
- Established: 2008
- Parent institution: Yuba Community College District
- Chancellor: Douglas Houston
- President: Artemio Pimentel
- Location: Woodland, California, United States
- Campus: Suburban
- Colors: Green, Silver, and Black
- Mascot: Eagle
- Website: wcc.yccd.edu

Woodland Community College is a public community college in Woodland, California, with additional campuses in Williams (Colusa County) and Clearlake (Lake County). It is a part of the Yuba Community College District and is accredited by the Accrediting Commission for Community and Junior Colleges.

== History ==
In the fall of 1975, Woodland offered courses in an outreach program. In 1981 the California Postsecondary Education Commission labeled Woodland as an official education center. In 1990, Woodland Center (now Woodland Community College) relocated to its current 120 acres (49 ha) parcel of land. In 1999, Yuba Community College District notified its intent for Woodland Center to become a self-sufficient community college, the same year that a Child Development center was opened on campus. The next year the district received the approval from the State Chancellor's office to begin Woodland Center's process of being a comprehensive college.

In 2006, Woodland Community College began the accreditation process through the Western Association of Schools and Colleges, completing the process in June 2008 with the notification of initial accreditation.
