= 13 Days, 13 Nights =

2025 French thriller-drama film about the Kabul evacuation

- French theatrical release poster
- French: 13 jours, 13 nuits
- Directed by: Martin Bourboulon
- Written by: Martin Bourboulon; Alexandre Smia; Trân-Minh Nam
- Based on: 13 jours, 13 nuits dans l'enfer de Kaboul by Mohamed Bida
- Produced by: Dimitri Rassam; Ardavan Safaee; Bastien Sirodot
- Starring: Roschdy Zem; Lyna Khoudri; Sidse Babett Knudsen; Christophe Montenez
- Cinematography: Nicolas Bolduc
- Edited by: Stan Collet
- Music by: Guillaume Roussel
- Production companies: Chapter 2 Productions; Logical Content Ventures; Pathé; M6 Films; Umedia; Canal+; Cinémage 19
- Distributed by: Pathé
- Release dates: 23 May 2025 (Cannes); 27 June 2025 (France)
- Running time: 112 minutes
- Countries: France; Belgium
- Languages: French; English; Dari
- Budget: €30 million
- Box office: $4 million

13 Days, 13 Nights (French: 13 Jours, 13 Nuits) is a 2025 political thriller film directed by Martin Bourboulon, co-written with Alexandre Smia and based on Mohamed Bida's non-fiction novel of same name. It stars Roschdy Zem as Bida, alongside Lyna Khoudri and Sidse Babett Knudsen, and follows the 2021 evacuation of the French Embassy in Kabul during the Taliban takeover.

The film had its world premiere out of competition of the 2025 Cannes Film Festival on 23 May. It was theatrically released in France on 27 June by Pathé. It received generally positive reviews, with critics praising Zem's performance, but under-performed at the French box office despite its €30 million budget.

== Plot ==
On 15 August 2021, as U.S. forces withdraw from Afghanistan and Kabul is captured by the Taliban, hundreds of Afghans gather at the gates of the French Embassy in Afghanistan trying to escape alongside NATO forces. Martinon, the French ambassador, is evacuated by helicopter to the U.S. forces headquarters at the Kabul airport, but some DGSE and embassy staff stay behind.

As Mohamed Bida drives through the city searching for Sediqi, an Afghan interpreter who collaborated with occupation forces, he witnesses the ensuing chaos and the insurgents hostility towards civilians and journalists, including Kate who has her camera shot after questioning the Taliban brutal repression of women. Despite Martin and other DGSE members hesitation, Bida convinces Martinon to authorize the entry of all civilians. This includes Eva, a Franco-Afghan aid worker, and her mother Amina. The first planned evacuation is frustrated when American helicopters are attacked by Taliban forces just outside the embassy. While negotiating with Taliban, Bida's frustration increases as the insurgents belittles Eva, as she translates the negotiation from Dari to French, and impose several obstacles to allow safe passage for the 400 refugees. Meanwhile, inside the embassy, Kate intervenes in DGSE decision to leave behind unidentified men, arguing they are local artists. Bida decides to evacuate all civilians in a six-bus convoy, even though he has not received a green light from Martinon. During the escape route, Taliban members surround the convoy demanding further investigations of the civilians identities, Bida once again tries to negotiate while Kate and some civilians are threatened by the armed insurgents. Arriving near the Kabul airport, the convoy is once again stopped and cleared, this time by a small group of the Afghan National Security Forces who are securing the road alongside the American forces. Near the airport gates, the last bus gets stuck in a containment fence, forcing Kate and Amina to walk by foot to the crowded gates, where thousands of Afghans are trying to escape.

Inside the airport, Martinon and Bida are informed by the CIA about an ongoing ISIS-K terrorist attack plan targeting the airport gates. Bida and Eva head to the main evacuation checkpoint hoping to rescue Amina and the bus group, while the U.S. military forces are containing a possible mass invasion. Bida is able to rescue most of the bus passengers before the gates close, but Kate and Amina are left behind amidst a dissatisfied crowd. Eva instructs her mother through phone to go the last open evacuation checkpoint. Nicole Gee, an American Marine, introduces herself to Bida while complains about her team's lack of proper training.

Bida bids farewell to Sediqi, who asks for an Islamic Republic of Afghanistan flag, and rushes to the last open evacuation checkpoint, where the U.S. forces struggles to maintain the order. Eva saves an injured Aminda from the agitated crowd, but Nicole spots a suicide bomber in the crowd. The attack kills at least 11 U.S. military members including Nicole, and injures Bida, Eva, Aminda and Kate. As one of the last airplanes is about to leave, Bida collects an IRA flag and a small portion of soil.

== Cast ==
- Roschdy Zem as Commandant Mohamed Bida
- Lyna Khoudri as Eva, a humanitarian worker
- Sidse Babett Knudsen as Kate, a journalist
- Christophe Montenez as Martin, a DGSE officer
- Sina Parvaneh as Sediqi, an Afghan interpreter
- Yan Tual as JC, a French Special Forces operative
- Fatima Adoum as Amina, Eva's mother
- Shoaib Saïd as Nangialay, the Taliban leader at the checkpoint
- Sayed Hashimi as Haider
- Nicolas Bridet as Martinon, the French ambassador to Kabul
- Grégoire Leprince-Ringuet as Nicolas Roche
- Athena Strates as Nicole Gee, a United States Marine Corps soldier

== Production ==
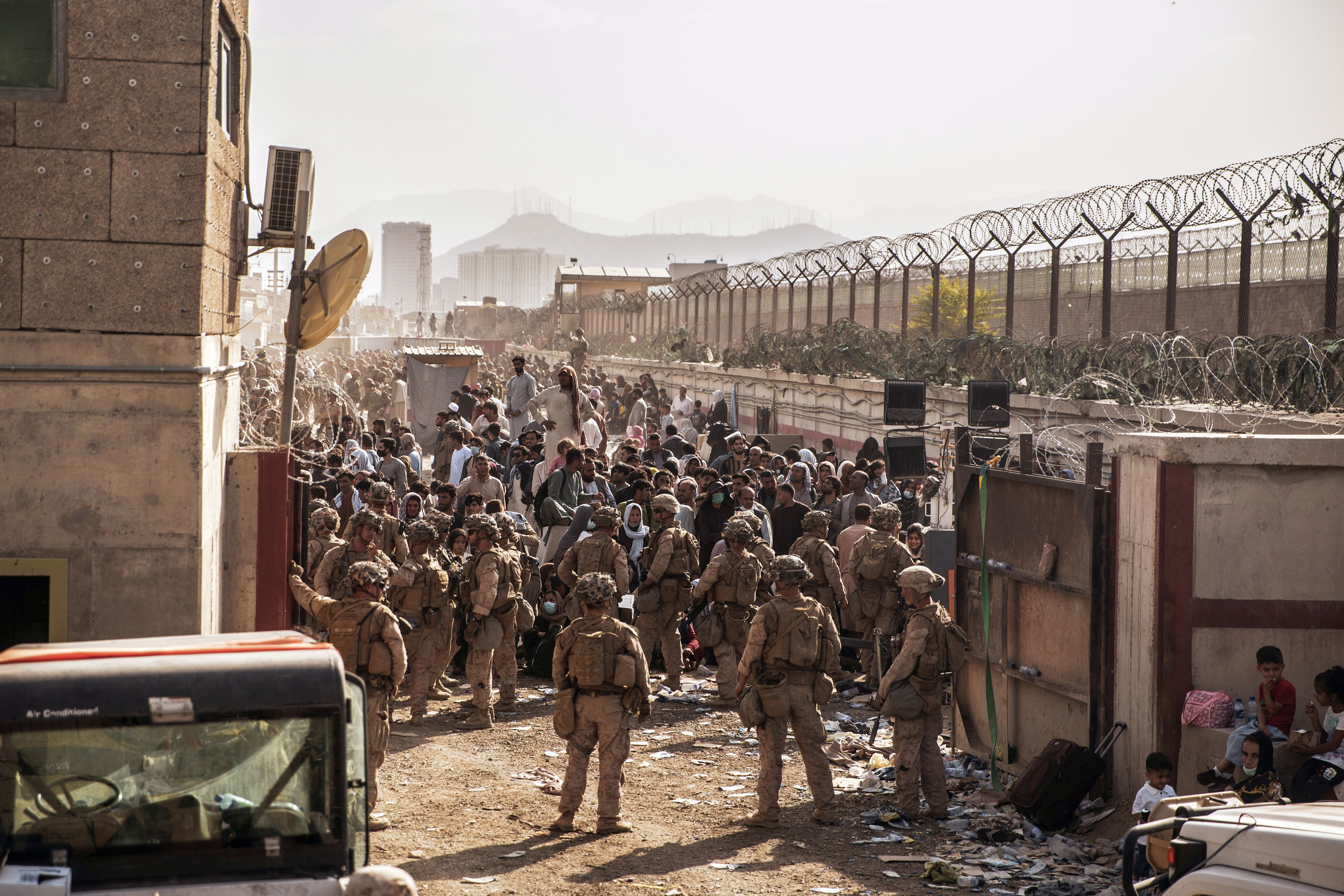
US Marines at an evacuation checkpoint at Kabul Airport

=== Development ===
Bourboulon discovered Bida's novel while editing The Three Musketeers: Milady (2023). He was drawn to the "meticulous" details of the operation and its emotional stakes. The project marked Bourboulon's shift from period films to contemporary drama.

=== Filming ===
Principal photography took place in Morocco, with additional scenes shot in France. Stunt sequences involved local performers and military advisors to recreate the Kabul chaos.

== Release ==
The film had its world premiere out of competition of the 2025 Cannes Film Festival on 23 May.

=== Box office ===
The film opened in 526 French theaters on 27 June 2025. It had 468 533 admissions at the French box office, grossing $4 million worldwide against its €30 million budget.

Its United States' distribution rights were acquired by Samuel Goldwyn Films shortly before the American French Film Festival in October.

== Critics ==
13 Jours, 13 Nuits received generally positive reviews from critics, who highlighted its commitment to historical accuracy and the compelling performance of Roschdy Zem.

RTS (Switzerland) described the film as "a tense yet uneven tribute to unsung heroes," praising its depiction of the evacuation from Kabul but pointing out moments where the storytelling lost focus.
