= James Sample (American football) =

American football player (born 1992)

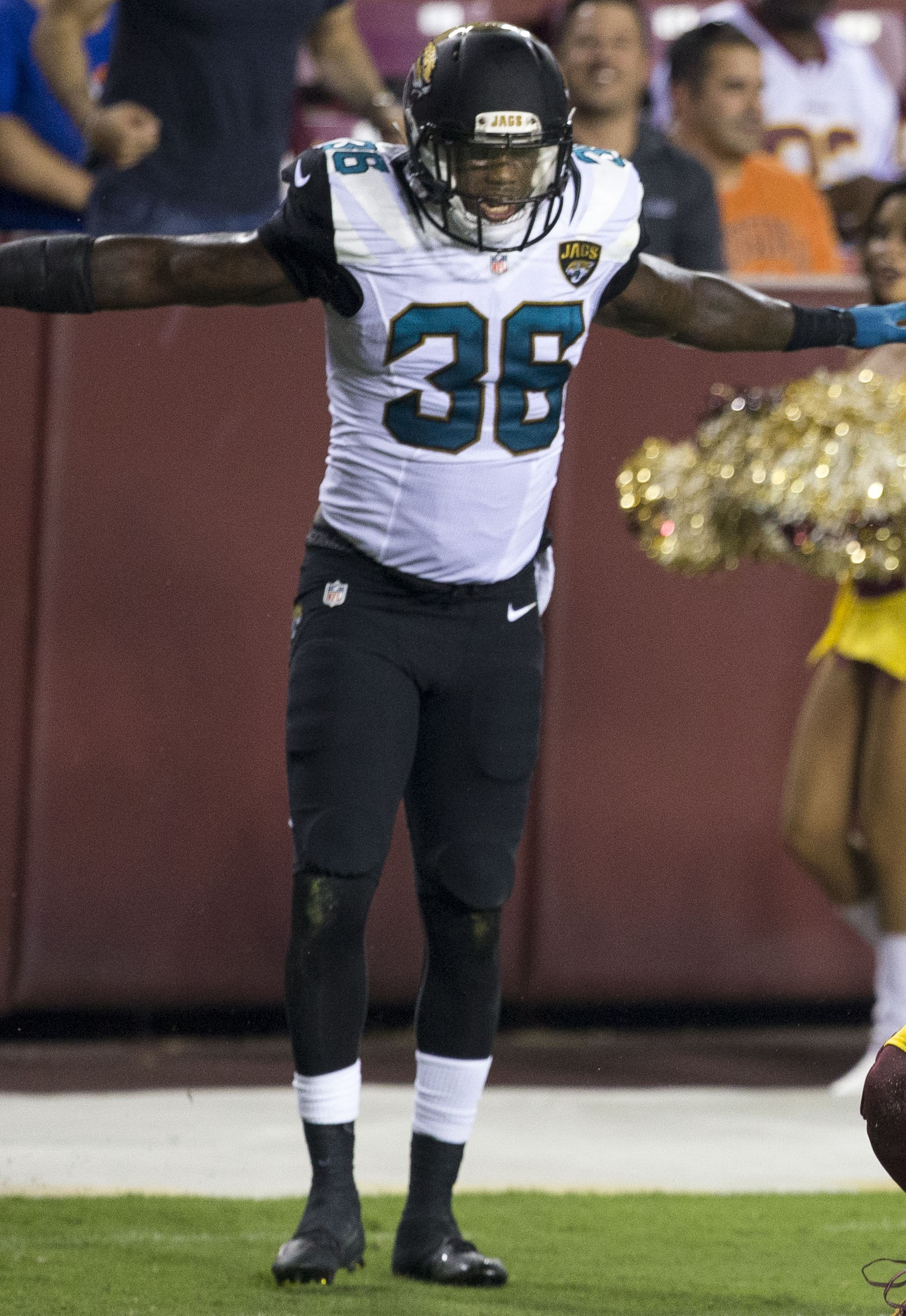
- Sample with the Jacksonville Jaguars in 2015

No. 23
- Position: Safety

Personal information
- Born: June 23, 1992 (age 34); Sacramento, California, U.S.
- Listed height: 6 ft 2 in (1.88 m)
- Listed weight: 215 lb (98 kg)

Career information
- High school: Grant Union (Sacramento)
- College: Louisville
- NFL draft: 2015: 4th round, 104th overall pick

Career history
- Jacksonville Jaguars (2015–2016); Washington Redskins (2018)*; Toronto Argonauts (2020–2022)
- * Offseason or practice squad member only

Career NFL statistics
- Total tackles: 15
- Pass deflections: 1
- Stats at Pro Football Reference

James Sample (born June 23, 1992) is an American former professional football player who was a safety in the National Football League (NFL). He played college football for the Washington Huskies and Louisville Cardinals, and was selected by the Jacksonville Jaguars in the fourth round of the 2015 NFL draft. Sample was also a member of the Washington Redskins and Toronto Argonauts.

== Early life ==
Sample attended Grant Union High School in Sacramento, California, where he was teammates with Viliami Moala and Shaq Thompson on the football team. As a junior, he was named first-team All-Metro and a PrepStar All-American as he helped lead Grant to a 12–1 record, totaling 111 tackles. He recorded 109 tackles as a senior at Grant, being named a high school All-American and was voted to participate in the U.S. Army All-America Bowl. He was also named first-team All-CIF San Joaquin Section, first-team All-Metro by the Sacramento Bee, first-team All-Delta Valley Conference, and first-team All-NorCal by NorCalPreps.com. He was dubbed a third-team All-state performer by ESPN.com in 2011.

Also a standout in track & field Sample was a state qualifier sprinter. At Grant Union High School, he posted personal-best times of 11.1 seconds in the 100-meter dash and 23.37 seconds in the 200-meter dash. He was also a member of the 4 × 100 m squad.

He was rated by Rivals.com as a four-star recruit. He committed to the University of Washington to play college football.

== College career ==
Sample attended Washington from 2011 to 2012. After playing in five games over two years, Sample left Washington and transferred to American River College. After one year at American River College, he transferred to the University of Louisville in 2014. He played in 13 games, recording 90 tackles and four interceptions. After the season, he entered the 2015 NFL draft, forgoing his senior year.

== Professional career ==
Pre-draft measurables
Height	Weight	Arm length	Hand span	40-yard dash	Three-cone drill	Vertical jump	Broad jump
6 ft 2 1/8 in (1.88 m)	209 lb (95 kg)	32 in (0.81 m)	9 1/2 in (0.24 m)	4.56 s	7.04 s	32.5 in (0.83 m)	10 ft 3 in (3.12 m)
All values from NFL Combine

=== Jacksonville Jaguars ===
Sample was selected by the Jacksonville Jaguars in the fourth round of the 2015 NFL draft with the 104th overall pick. He played in four games with two starts his rookie year before suffering a shoulder injury in Week 4, keeping him out the rest of the season. On August 30, 2016, Sample was placed on injured reserve with a shoulder injury. On August 6, 2017, Sample was released by the Jaguars.

=== Washington Redskins ===
On January 1, 2018, Sample signed a reserve/future contract with the Washington Redskins. He was released on April 30, 2018.

=== Toronto Argonauts ===
Sample signed with the Toronto Argonauts of the Canadian Football League on January 27, 2020. He signed a contract extension with the team on December 21, 2020. He was placed on the suspended list on July 10, 2021. On May 12, 2022, the Argonauts placed Sample on the retired list. He never made an appearance for Toronto.
