= Nicole Gee =

United States Marine Corps Sergeant (1998–2021)

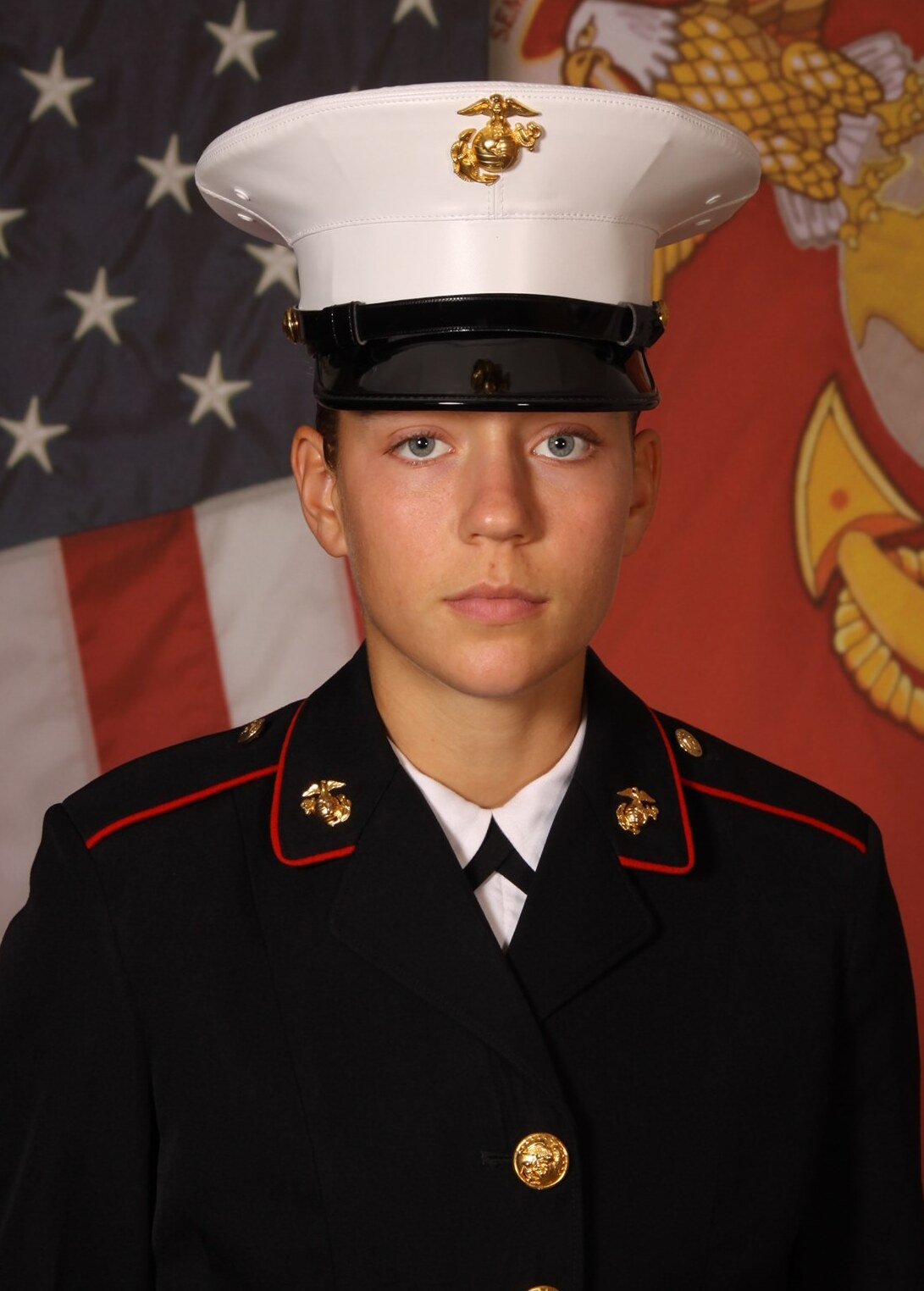
- Official military portrait of Gee
- Born: Nicole Leeann Herrera; May 1, 1998; Vail, Colorado, U.S.
- Died: August 26, 2021 (aged 23) Kabul, Afghanistan
- Cause of death: Suicide bombing attack
- Buried: Arlington National Cemetery
- Allegiance: United States
- Branch: United States Marine Corps
- Service years: 2017–2021
- Rank: Sergeant
- Conflicts: Operation Allies Refuge
- Awards: Congressional Gold Medal; See full list
- Spouse: Jarod Gee

Nicole Leeann Gee (née Herrera; May 1, 1998 – August 26, 2021) was a United States Marine Corps Sergeant who was killed in Afghanistan during Operation Allies Refuge. She was posthumously awarded the Congressional Gold Medal.

According to a U.S. Department of Defense memorial plaque, "Sgt. Gee's actions, in addition to the actions of Sgt. Rosario Pichardo, and that of the other servicewomen working in the screening of female evacuees saved, on estimation, over 124,000 lives in America's largest airlift operation ever."

== Biography ==
Nicole Leeann Herrera was born on May 1, 1998, in Vail, Colorado. She grew up in Roseville, California. She was a graduate of Oakmont High School with a 4.1 GPA, where she played on the school softball team. She met her husband Jarod Gee (a fellow Marine) while in high school, and they were married in a private ceremony in August 2016.

In 2017, Gee enlisted in the U.S. Marine Corps. She went through recruit training at Parris Island, Infantry School at Camp Lejeune, Aviation Accession and Primary Military Occupational Specialty School in Pensacola, Florida, and Marine Corps Communications and Electronics School in 29 Palms, California. Gee and her husband Jarod Gee were stationed together at Camp Lejeune. She was assigned to Combat Logistics Battalion 24, Combat Logistics Regiment 27, 2nd Marine Logistics Group, II Marine Expeditionary Force, where she provided maintenance and support of ground electronics transmission systems.

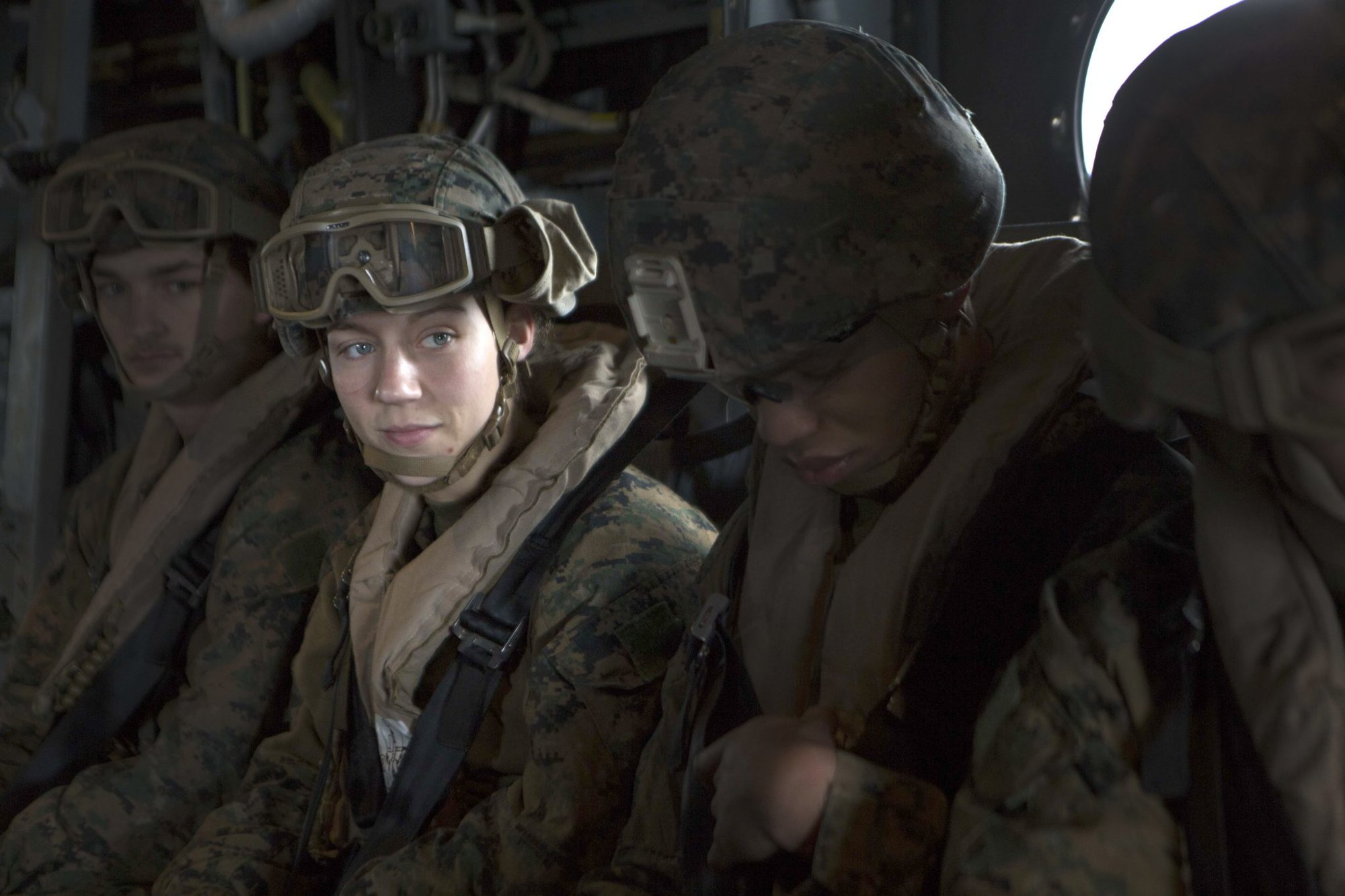
Gee on board an MV-22B Osprey in April 2021

She deployed with the 24th Marine Expeditionary Unit in February 2021, and was stationed for a period on the USS Iwo Jima. During her deployment, Gee's stops included Spain, Greece, Saudi Arabia, Oman, and Kuwait. Nicole was meritoriously promoted to Sergeant while in Kuwait on August 2, 2021. Gee set weightlifting records at Al-Jaber Air Base, and achieved perfect scores in the Combat Fitness Test. She described herself as a "positive mental health advocate."

=== Operation Allies Refuge and death ===
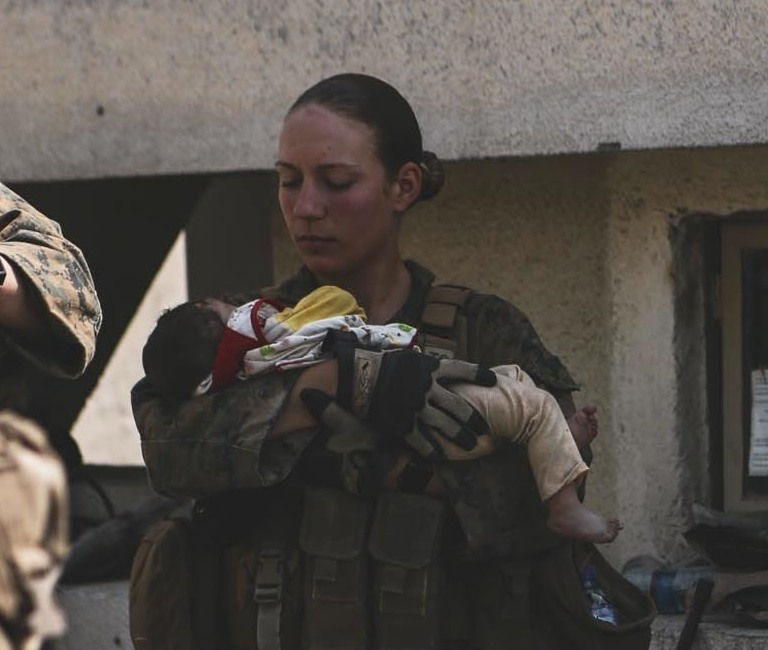
Gee cradling an infant in Kabul, Afghanistan, August 2021 (from Department of Defense X post)

Gee deployed to Afghanistan in support of the withdrawal of U.S. troops from the region as part of Operation Allies Refuge. While there, she served on a Female Engagement Team where she facilitated evacuation support for Afghan women and children at Kabul International Airport. Six days before her death, Gee posted a photograph of herself holding an Afghan infant on Instagram, with the caption "I love my job." After her death, the photo went viral.

Her fellow Marines shared that Gee "worked tirelessly, forgoing sleep and rest to help as many Afghan women and children escape as she could." In Tim Kennedy's memoir Scars and Stripes: An Unapologetically American Story of Fighting the Taliban, UFC Warriors, and Myself, he recounted meeting Gee while in Afghanistan, and that she had helped him to search the women who had been rescued before bringing them on the base. Kennedy wrote, "She wasn't going through the motions - she greeted every Afghan with a smile. She loved her job and her service."

On August 26, 2021, Gee was killed in an ISIS-K suicide bombing attack in Kabul along with 12 other service members. The Dignified transfer of Gee's remains back to the United States was attended by President Joe Biden, First Lady Jill Biden, Secretary of Defense Lloyd Austin, and Chairman of the Joint Chiefs of Staff Mark Milley. Gee is buried at Arlington National Cemetery.

== Awards and honors ==
Gee's military awards include a Purple Heart, Combat Action Ribbon, Good Conduct Medal, National Defense Service Medal, Afghanistan Campaign Medal, Global War on Terrorism Service Medal, Sea Service Deployment Ribbon, NATO Medal, Expert Rifle Qualification Third Award. In September 2021, Congressman Greg Murphy delivered a tribute speech in honor of Gee on the floor of the House of Representatives, and Congressman Kevin Kiley delivered another in September 2024. On December 16, 2021, President Biden signed H.R. 5142 into law, which posthumously awarded Gee and 12 other service members with the Congressional Gold Medal.

In 2024, the USS Iwo Jima unveiled a memorial honoring Gee's life and service and renamed the ship's gymnasium the Sergeant Gee Memorial Gym in her honor. In May 2024, the California State Assembly unanimously passed a resolution to dedicate a portion of Interstate 80 as the Nicole Gee Memorial Highway. In June of the same year, the Okaloosa County Board of Commissioners unanimously approved the addition of a new bronze statue honoring Gee to be added to the Veterans Park on Okaloosa Island, Florida.

In August 2024, President Donald Trump laid a ceremonial wreath in honor of Gee at the Tomb of the Unknown Soldier and visited her gravestone at Arlington National Cemetery.

=== List of additional honors ===
- In 2024, the Sgt. Nicole Gee Memorial Foundation was established as a 501(c)3 nonprofit organization in her honor.
- The city of Citrus Heights, California and American Legion dedicated a memorial park bench to Gee.
- Since 2021, the Women Veterans Alliance now annually awards the Beyond the Call of Duty Award in honor of Gee.
- In 2022, the Foundation for Women Warriors published a tribute to Gee.
- The Sgt. Nicole Gee Memorial Scholarship was established by Oakmont High School.
- In 2023, the city of West Roseville named a street "Nicole Gee Drive" in her honor. Gee's family took a ceremonial first drive down the road on a Roseville Fire Department truck, led by the Roseville Police Motor Unit, and followed by a motorcycle contingent of local veterans, while attendees lined the streets waving American flags.

== In popular culture ==
Gee is the subject of a 2022 painting by Alicia Christy, which was featured by the Veterans History Project of the Library of Congress.

ABC 10 News produced a tribute documentary about Gee's life and impact.

Gee is portrayed by Athena Strates in 2025's French film 13 Days, 13 Nights, which follows the U.S. forces withdraw from Afghanistan from the French Commandant Mohamed Bida point-of-view.
