= Oakmont High School =

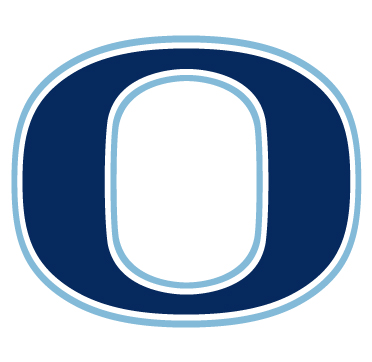

Location
- 1710 Cirby Way; Roseville, California 95661; United States; 38.7280°N 121.2611°W

Information
- Type: Public
- Established: 1965
- School district: Roseville Joint Union High School District
- Principal: Marc Buljan
- Teaching staff: 59.70 (FTE)
- Grades: 9-12
- Enrollment: 1,290 (2024-2025)
- Student to teacher ratio: 21.61
- Colors: Columbia Blue, Navy Blue & White
- Mascot: Viking
- Newspaper: Norse Notes
- Yearbook: Odinboken
- Website: oakmont.rjuhsd.us

Oakmont High School is located at 1710 Cirby Way, in Roseville, California, United States. The school is surrounded by the communities of Citrus Heights, Rocklin, Granite Bay, and Antelope. It is one of five comprehensive high schools in the Roseville Joint Union High School District.

== History ==
Oakmont opened in September, 1965.

In 2014, fourteen players were suspended from the football team for drug usage.

In 2021, hundreds of students were forced to quarantine due to COVID-19 after five students tested positive.

== Racial Incidents ==
In 2014, one of two hazing incidents that targeted an African-American student resulted in the thirteen students being charged with hate crimes. At the time, Oakmont was largely white, with only 3 percent of the schools population being black. In 2022 another racist incident occurred in which two separate white students, spurred on by nationwide protests involving the treatment of George Floyd, spread videos with offensive content toward black students.

== Academics ==
=== Advanced placement classes ===
During the 2008–2009 school year, 200 students took Advanced Placement exams. According to the California Department of Education, approximately 47% of the exams taken that year were scored a “3” or better.

=== Alternative courses ===
The school also offers the International Baccalaureate (IB) Diploma and the Health Careers Academy. The latter is a three-year college preparatory program for students who want to explore working in healthcare.

Oakmont High School's student-run business program, Viking Printing Press.

== Demographics ==
As of the 2022–2023 school year, the school had an enrollment of 1,602 students, of whom 10 were American Indian/Alaska natives, 250 were Asian, 43 were Black, 417 Hispanic, 13 Native Hawaiian/Pacific Islander, 765 White, and 93 of two or more races. 324 were eligible for free lunch and 34 for reduced-price lunch. The school reported 77.55 teachers on a full-time-equivalent basis.

== Notable alumni ==
- Dan Bunz — NFL linebacker for the Super Bowl Champion San Francisco 49ers
- Brendan Burch — CEO of Six Point Harness
- Preston Guilmet — professional baseball player
- Tim McCord — guitarist and songwriter for the rock band Evanescence
- Rich Rodas — professional baseball player
- Summer Sanders — world champion swimmer, Olympic Gold-medalist, TV personality, actress
- Doug Siebum — audio engineer
- Ryan Suarez — professional soccer player
- Betsy Barr — professional soccer player
- Nicole Gee - US marine killed during Operation Allies Refuge
