= David Kilson =

American football player (born 1960)

No. 43
- Position: Defensive back

Personal information
- Born: August 11, 1960 (age 66); San Francisco, California, U.S.
- Listed height: 6 ft 1 in (1.85 m)
- Listed weight: 200 lb (91 kg)

Career information
- High school: Grant Union (Sacramento, California)
- College: Sacramento CC (1979–1980); Nevada (1981–1982)
- NFL draft: 1983: undrafted

Career history
- Buffalo Bills (1983)

Career NFL statistics
- Fumble recoveries: 3
- Touchdowns: 1
- Stats at Pro Football Reference

David Wayne Kilson (born August 11, 1960) is an American former professional football player who was a defensive back for the Buffalo Bills of the National Football League (NFL). He played college football for the Sacramento City Panthers and Nevada Wolf Pack.

== Early life ==
David Wayne Kilson was born on August 11, 1960, in San Francisco, California. He attended Grant Union High School in Sacramento, California.

== College career ==
Kilson first played college football at Sacramento City College from 1979 to 1980. He was then a two-year letterman for the Nevada Wolf Pack of the University of Nevada, Reno from 1981 to 1982. In 2003, he was inducted into the Sacramento City College Hall of Fame.

== Professional career ==
After going undrafted in the 1983 NFL draft, Kilson signed with the Buffalo Bills on May 12. He played in all 16 games, starting two, for the Bills during the 1983 season, recovering three fumbles for 88 yards and one touchdown. His 87-yard fumble recovery that was returned for a touchdown on September 25, 1983, is the longest fumble return in Bills history. Kilson's 88 fumble recovery yards are also the most in one season in team history. He was released by the Bills on August 20, 1984.
