= Dan Bunz =

American football player (born 1955)

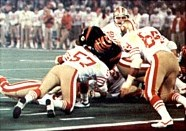
- Bunz (57) playing for the 49ers in Super Bowl XVI

No. 57, 97
- Position: Linebacker

Personal information
- Born: October 7, 1955 (age 71); Roseville, California, U.S.
- Listed height: 6 ft 4 in (1.93 m)
- Listed weight: 226 lb (103 kg)

Career information
- High school: Oakmont (Roseville)
- College: Long Beach State
- NFL draft: 1978: 1st round, 24th overall pick

Career history
- San Francisco 49ers (1978–1984); Detroit Lions (1985)

Awards and highlights
- 2× Super Bowl champion (XVI, XIX); PFWA All-Rookie Team (1978); First-team All-Coast (1977)

Career NFL statistics
- Sacks: 6
- Interceptions: 4
- Fumble recoveries: 14
- Stats at Pro Football Reference

Dan Bunz (born October 7, 1955) is an American former professional football player who was a linebacker for eight seasons in the National Football League (NFL) from 1978 to 1985, primarily with the San Francisco 49ers.

Bunz played at Oakmont High School, the University of California, Riverside, and California State University, Long Beach before being drafted in the first round of the 1978 NFL draft by the 49ers. He had a small role in the 1979 movie North Dallas Forty. He taught physical education at Miwok Middle School (renamed from Sutter Middle School in 2023), in Sacramento, California for over 25 years.

== The Stop ==
In Super Bowl XVI (January 24, 1982), Bunz made one of the most famous tackles in NFL history. On a critical 3rd-and-Goal from the 1-yard line, Cincinnati Bengals quarterback Ken Anderson passed to Charles Alexander in the right flat, but Bunz came up fast, grabbed Alexander around the waist, and hurled him backward before he could break the plane of the goal line. Had Bunz tackled Alexander low, his momentum certainly would have carried him into the end zone. Known as "The Stop", the play was followed by another stop on 4th down, slowing Cincinnati's comeback and ultimately propelling the 49ers to their first Super Bowl title.

== Personal life ==
Bunz is a lifelong Placer County resident who grew up in Roseville with his older siblings Ben and Dennis. He retired from the Detroit Lions at age 30 after a contract dispute, and became a teacher at Sutter Middle School in Sacramento. He and his wife own a farm on the Placer County Wine Trail.

In 1984 Bunz opened Bunz & Company restaurant and sports bar in his hometown of Roseville, California. He sold the restaurant in 1999, and it closed in the summer of 2012. On January 19, 2013, Bunz and some other entrepreneurs opened 2H - 2nd Half at Bunz & Company in the same location as the original Bunz and Company. He appeared in an episode of HGTV's Yard Crashers when his daughters' back yard got a makeover. Hillside Terrace (2012)
