= Yuba College =

Community college in Yuba County, California, US

Coordinates: 39.12720°N 121.53937°W

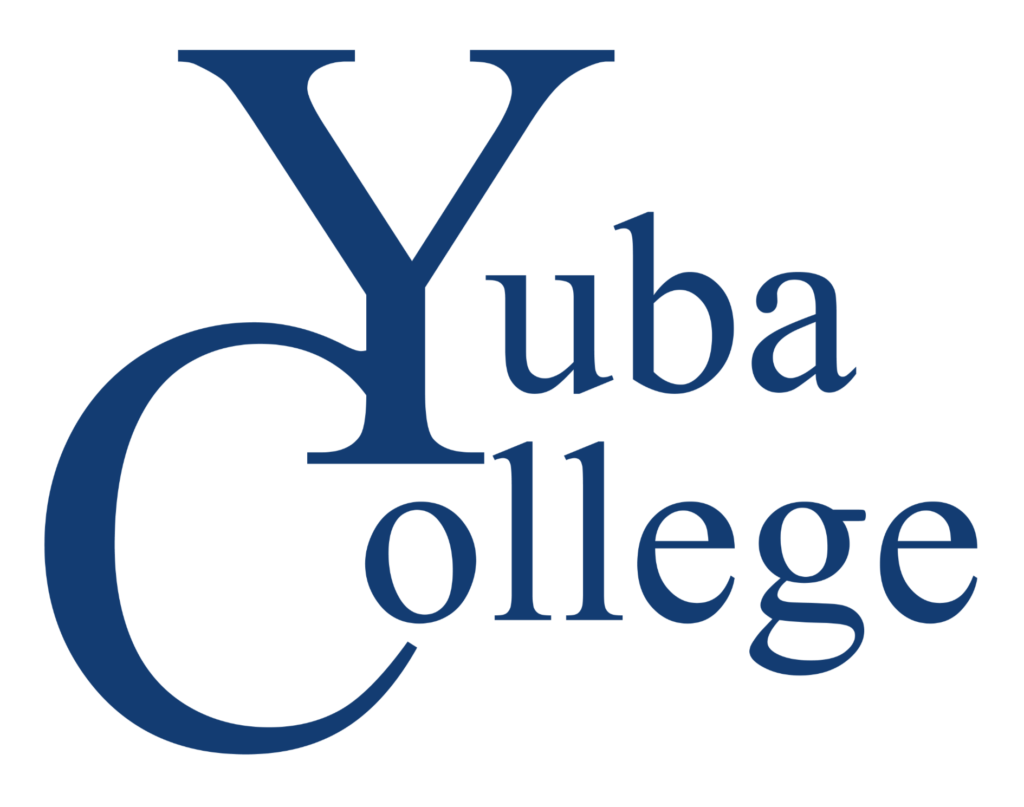
- Type: Public community college
- Established: 1927; 99 years ago
- Parent institution: Yuba Community College District
- President: Tawny Dotson
- Students: 8,738
- Location: Marysville, California, United States
- Colors: Blue and Gold
- Mascot: 49er
- Website: yc.yccd.edu

Yuba College (/ˈjuːbə/) is a public community college in Marysville, Yuba County, California. It is part of the Yuba Community College District.

The college district has an extension campus in Yuba City, California. Yuba College is one of two colleges in the district, the other being Woodland Community College in Woodland, California.

Yuba College graduates an average of 300 people each spring. Many students transfer to Chico State, Sacramento State, or UC Davis.

== Notable alumni ==
- Merle Anthony, professional baseball umpire
- Donald J. Butz, retired major general in the United States Air Force
- Stacy Dragila, Olympic pole vaulter
- Elonka Dunin, video game developer
- Rodney Hannah, professional football player
- John P. Kee, gospel singer and pastor
- Dan Logue, assemblyman in the California's 3rd State Assembly district
- Don Young, U.S. Representative for Alaska's at-large congressional district (did not graduate)
- Festus Ezeli, professional basketball player
- Kameron Warrens, basketball player
