= C. J. Wallace (American football) =

American football player (born 1985)

C.J. Wallace
No. 39, 26, 27
- Position: Safety

Personal information
- Born: April 17, 1985 (age 41); Sacramento, California, U.S.
- Listed height: 6 ft 0 in (1.83 m)
- Listed weight: 218 lb (99 kg)

Career information
- High school: Grant Union (Sacramento)
- College: Washington
- NFL draft: 2007: undrafted

Career history
- Seattle Seahawks (2007–2009); Las Vegas Locomotives (2010); San Diego Chargers (2011); Las Vegas Locomotives (2012)

Awards and highlights
- UFL champion (2010); First-team All-Pac-10 (2006); Washington Defensive MVP (2006)

Career NFL statistics
- Total tackles: 19
- Stats at Pro Football Reference

Cecil James Wallace Jr. (born April 17, 1985) is an American former professional football player who was a safety in the National Football League (NFL). He played college football for the Washington Huskies. Wallace was signed by the Seattle Seahawks as an undrafted free agent in 2009. He also played for the Las Vegas Locomotives and San Diego Chargers.

== Early life ==
Wallace played running back and free safety at Grant Union High School, accumulating 1,600 rushing yards and 25 touchdowns and made 73 tackles at free safety as a senior.

== College career ==
Wallace played 45 games, including 29 starts, for Washington. He totaled 258 career tackles (160 solo), five forced fumbles and one fumble recovery as a Husky. Wallace was an All-Pac-10 performer in his senior season. Wallace majored in American ethnic studies at college.

== Professional career ==
=== Seattle Seahawks ===
Wallace, signed as an undrafted free agent, played in nine games with the Seattle Seahawks with two tackles in his first professional season. His season was cut short due to a knee injury and he was placed on the injured reserve list on December 5, 2007.

=== Las Vegas Locomotives ===
Wallace played for the Las Vegas Locomotives in 2010 where he helped them win a championship.

=== San Diego Chargers ===
Wallace signed a future contract with the San Diego Chargers on January 12, 2011. He was released on September 13.
