= Del Paso Heights, Sacramento, California =

Del Paso Heights, California
- Neighborhood of Sacramento
- Nicknames: The Heights, D.P.H., Del Paso
- Motto: 2's Up
- Location within Sacramento
- Coordinates: 38°38′10″N 121°25′13″W
- Country: United States
- State: California
- County: Sacramento
- City: Sacramento
- Elevation: 52 ft (16 m)
- GNIS ID: 1658397

Del Paso Heights is a neighborhood within the city of Sacramento in Sacramento County, California, United States. The generally recognized borders of Del Paso Heights consist of the Beltline Freeway Interstate 80 on the north, Norwood Avenue on the west, Arcade Creek on the south, and Roseville Road on the east. Del Paso Heights is located in Area 4 of Sacramento which is defined as the city north of the American River.

== History ==
Del Paso Heights was originally part of a 44,000-acre (178 km^{2}) Rancho Del Paso Mexican land grant to Eliab Grimes in 1844. James Ben Ali Haggin acquired the land in 1862. He converted the ranch on the property into a thoroughbred horse breeding farm, producing California's first Kentucky Derby winner in 1886. Del Paso Heights was part of the census-designated place of Del Paso Heights-Robla, which recorded a population of 11,495 in 1960.

== Geography ==
Del Paso Heights is located at 38.6360152 degrees north and 121.4202312 degrees west (38°38′10″N 121°25′13″W). The area extends north to south from I-80 to Arcade Creek and east to west from Marysville Blvd. to Western Ave. North Sacramento lies adjacent to Del Paso Heights. It is bounded by Arcade Creek on the north, Arden Way on the south, and Auburn Blvd. on the east, and Western Ave. on the west (Map of the two communities, Appendix 1).

== Demographics ==
There is considerable ethnic diversity, particularly in Del Paso Heights, where many Southeast Asian families have taken up residence in the last decade. In the 1990 census, for example, the population of Del Paso Heights was 49% African American (13,213) and 16% Asian/Pacific Islander (4,319). The neighborhood has a crime rate 5 times higher than average for Sacramento County. The neighborhood has a population of 34,879 and is roughly 70% African-American.

== Education ==
- Grant Union High School is in Del Paso Heights.

== In popular culture ==
In the 1963 novel, "Run, River", Del Paso Heights is "...noted for its large Negro population and its high incidence of minor social disorder".
