= Dry Creek Joint Elementary School District =

School district in California, United States

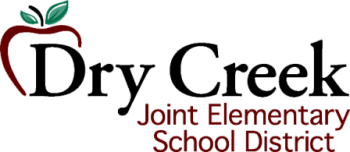

Address
- 8849 Cook Riolo Road Roseville, Placer, California, 95747; United States
- Coordinates: 38°44′19.172″N 121°20′12.973″W

District information
- Type: Public
- Motto: Excellence in Education Since 1876.
- Grades: K–8
- Established: 1876; 150 years ago
- President: Jean Pagnone
- Superintendent: Cliff De Graw
- Asst. superintendent(s): Sara Wegner
- Schools: 9
- NCES District ID: 0611490

Students and staff
- Students: 6,335 (2021 - 2022)
- Staff: 216.95 (FTE)
- Student–teacher ratio: 21.1:1

Other information
- Website: www.drycreek.k12.ca.us

The Dry Creek Joint Elementary School District began in 1876, with only a few students in a schoolhouse. It is now among the fastest growing school districts in the State of California. The District has constructed new elementary schools in the past four years. Creekview Ranch Middle School was the most recent school to open in the district, first serving students for the 2008–2009 school year. It is anticipated that the District will continue to grow for the next 10 years, serving approximately 8,500 K-8 students.

In 2003 Center Unified School District gave territory to Roseville Joint Union High School District and Dry Creek Joint Elementary School District.

== Schools ==
- Antelope Crossing Middle School
- Antelope Meadows Elementary School
- Barrett Ranch Elementary School
- Connections Academy
- Coyote Ridge Elementary School
- Creekview Ranch TK-8 School
- Heritage Oak Elementary School
- Olive Grove Elementary School
- Quail Glen Elementary School
- Silverado Middle School
