= Mitch Donahue =

American football player (born 1968)

No. 54
- Position: Linebacker

Personal information
- Born: February 4, 1968 (age 58); Los Angeles, California, U.S.
- Listed height: 6 ft 2 in (1.88 m)
- Listed weight: 254 lb (115 kg)

Career information
- High school: Billings West (Billings, Montana)
- College: Wyoming
- NFL draft: 1991: 4th round, 95th overall pick

Career history
- San Francisco 49ers (1991–1992); Denver Broncos (1993–1994); Atlanta Falcons (1995)*; Buffalo Destroyers (1999)
- * Offseason or practice squad member only

Awards and highlights
- First-team All-American (1990); 2× WAC Defensive Player of the Year (1989, 1990); 3× First-team All-WAC (1988, 1989, 1990)

Career NFL statistics
- Tackles: 10
- Stats at Pro Football Reference

Mitch Donahue (born February 4, 1968) is an American former professional football player who was a linebacker in the National Football League (NFL). He played college football as a defensive lineman for the Wyoming Cowboys and was a two-time Western Athletic Conference (WAC) Defensive Player of the Year. He later spent four seasons in the NFL. He was selected by the San Francisco 49ers in the fourth round of the 1991 NFL draft.

He was born in Los Angeles, and graduated in 1986 from Billings West High School in Billings, Montana.
