= Center High School (California) =

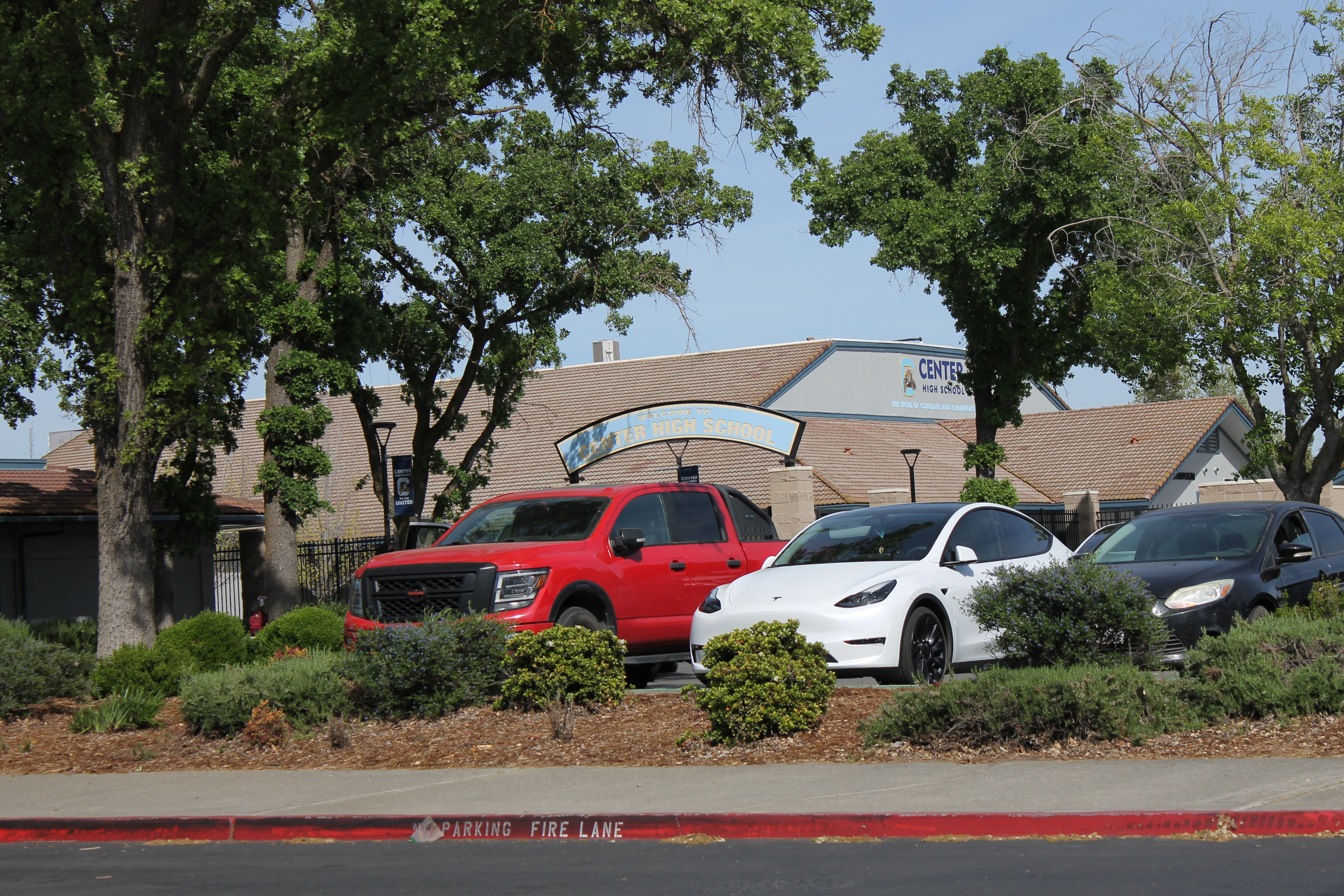

Location
- 3111 Center Court Lane; Antelope, California; United States; 38.71969°N 121.38884°W

Information
- Type: Public, High School
- Motto: "The Home of Scholars and Champions"
- Established: 1982
- Status: Open
- School district: Center Unified School District
- Principal: Jerald Ferguson
- Teaching staff: 66.50 (FTE)
- Grades: 9-12
- Enrollment: 1,367 (2023–2024)
- Student to teacher ratio: 20.56
- Classes offered: Comprehensive
- Language: English
- Hours in school day: 7 hours
- Colors: Columbia Blue & Gold
- Athletics conference: Pioneer Valley League
- Mascot: Cougar
- Rival: Foothill High School, Antelope High School, Rio Linda High School
- Accreditation: ERP Honor Roll
- Newspaper: The Blue and Gold
- Yearbook: Epic
- Communities served: Antelope, Rio Linda, Roseville
- Website: chs.centerusd.org

Center High School is a high school in Antelope, California, United States. The school was constructed in 1984. It is one of two high schools in the Center Unified School District. The school's colors are blue and gold, and the school mascot is the cougar. The Principal is Jerald Ferguson and there are two Asst. Principals. The school is well known for its diversity of many ethnic groups.

== Campus ==
Center High School consists of various buildings in which classes are held. There are three buildings in the front of the school with the gym and locker rooms in one, the multipurpose room in another, and the administration.

The school also hosts a variety of sports facilities as well. The school's football, soccer and track & field stadium was completed in 2009. Basketball and volleyball are played in the main gym, while wrestling takes place in the auxiliary Ken Thomas Gym. There are 6 tennis courts for the tennis team and two each of baseball and softball fields. The swim team uses the pool nearby Rio Linda High School, while the golf teams use neighboring Cherry Island Golf Course.

== Media Communications Academy ==
The school's Media Communications Academy (MCA), which is defined as "a school within a school", is dedicated to new media, video and audio production, and digital graphics. The program is available to students in their sophomore, junior and senior years. Students are enrolled in classes together as a group for English, Social Studies, Spanish, and Media classes and more.

The MCA is based on a program developed by a teacher, who won an $80,000 award to develop the program designed to help unmotivated students.

== Media ==
Blue & Gold is a school newspaper that covers topics dealing with events and going-ons within the High School as well as in popular entertainment. Blue & Gold was awarded with multiple Gold Crowns from the Columbia Scholastic Press Association in the years 1999, 2001, 2003, 2004, 2005, and 2006 and a silver crown in the 2007-2008 year.

Center High School's "Epic" yearbook has received seven National Pacemaker Awards. It has also won multiple awards from the Columbia Scholastic Press Association including multiple gold and silver crowns.

== Alumni ==
- Nathan Lukes - Major League Baseball outfielder of the Toronto Blue Jays
- Rich Manning - NBA basketball player
- Fenuki Tupou - NFL guard, drafted in 2009 by the Philadelphia Eagles as a 5th round pick. Last played in 2012 with the New Orleans Saints.
- Michael Wortham - NFL wide receiver, undrafted in 2026 by the Jacksonville Jaguars
