= Christian Tupou =

American football player (born 1989)

BYU Cougars football
- Title: Assistant strength and conditioning

Personal information
- Born: May 7, 1989 (age 37); Sacramento, California, U.S.
- Listed height: 6 ft 4 in (1.93 m)
- Listed weight: 305 lb (138 kg)

Career information
- Position: Defensive line
- High school: Grant Union (Sacramento, California)
- College: Southern California
- NFL draft: 2013: undrafted

Career history

Playing
- Chicago Bears (2013); Indianapolis Colts (2013)*; San Francisco 49ers (2014)*; Arizona Cardinals (2014)*; Cleveland Browns (2014–2015)*
- * Offseason or practice squad member only

Coaching
- Oregon (2022–2023) Assistant strength and conditioning; BYU (2024-current) Assistant strength and conditioning
- Stats at Pro Football Reference

Christian Philip Tupou (born May 7, 1989) is an American football defensive end. He was undrafted but signed with the Chicago Bears in 2012. He played college football at USC.

== Early life ==
Tupou played defensive end and fullback at Grant High School in Sacramento, California. He had 82 tackles and 5 sacks in 2006 as Grant went 13-0. As a junior in 2005, he was All-Area, All-City and All-League as he had 85 tackles, 16 sacks and 3 fumble recoveries.

== College career ==
Tupou started for three seasons at nose tackle for the USC Trojans. He was named 2008 Pac-10 All-Academic honorable mention as a Political Science major. Tupou saw brief action in four games (Washington State, Notre Dame, Arizona State and Illinois) as a reserve defensive tackle as a first-year freshman in 2007. He won USC's John McKay Award and Service Team Defensive Player of the Year Award.

Tupou started at nose tackle for his second season as a junior in 2009. Overall in 2009 while appearing in all 13 games (and starting all but Notre Dame and Oregon State), he had 25 tackles, including 4 for losses (with 1.5 sacks), and 2 forced fumbles. He made 2009 All-Pac-10 honorable mention and won USC Co-Defensive Lineman of the Year Award and Bob Chandler Award.

Tupou was set to anchor the line in 2010 as a senior tackle starting for his third year. But he tore ligaments in his left knee in USC's spring game that concluded 2010 spring drills, so he redshirted while sidelined in 2010. He won USC's Courage Award and USC's Co-Lifter of the Year Award.

Tupou started all thirteen games at nose tackle as a senior in 2011. He was named All-Pac-12 honorable mention.

== Professional career ==
=== NFL Combine ===
Pre-draft measurables
Height	Weight	Arm length	Hand span	40-yard dash	20-yard split	Three-cone drill	Vertical jump	Bench press	Wonderlic
6 ft 2 in (1.88 m)	305 lb (138 kg)	32 in (0.81 m)	9 3/4 in (0.25 m)	5.10 s	4.87 s	8.07 s	24 in (0.61 m)	30 reps	unreported
20-ss, 3-cone, vertical, and broad jump from Florida Pro Day. All others from NFL Combine

=== Chicago Bears ===
Tupou signed with the Chicago Bears as an undrafted free agent in 2012. Tupou received his first NFL start in the preseason against the Cleveland Browns and recorded a sack. He was released in 2013.

=== Indianapolis Colts ===
Tupou was signed to the practice squad on January 3, 2014.

=== San Francisco 49ers ===
Tupou was signed to 49ers roster on January 22, 2014. Tupou was released by the 49ers to make room for Josh Johnson on May 14, 2014.

=== Arizona Cardinals ===
Tupou signed with the Arizona Cardinals in May 2014. The Cardinals released Tupou on August 30, 2014, but he shortly re-signed to their practice squad.

=== Cleveland Browns ===
Tupou was signed to the Cleveland Browns practice squad on October 17, 2014. He was released by the Browns on December 9, 2014. On May 30, 2015, he was re-signed by the Browns. On August 16, 2015, he was released by the Browns.
