= Antelope, California =

Antelope
- Census-designated place
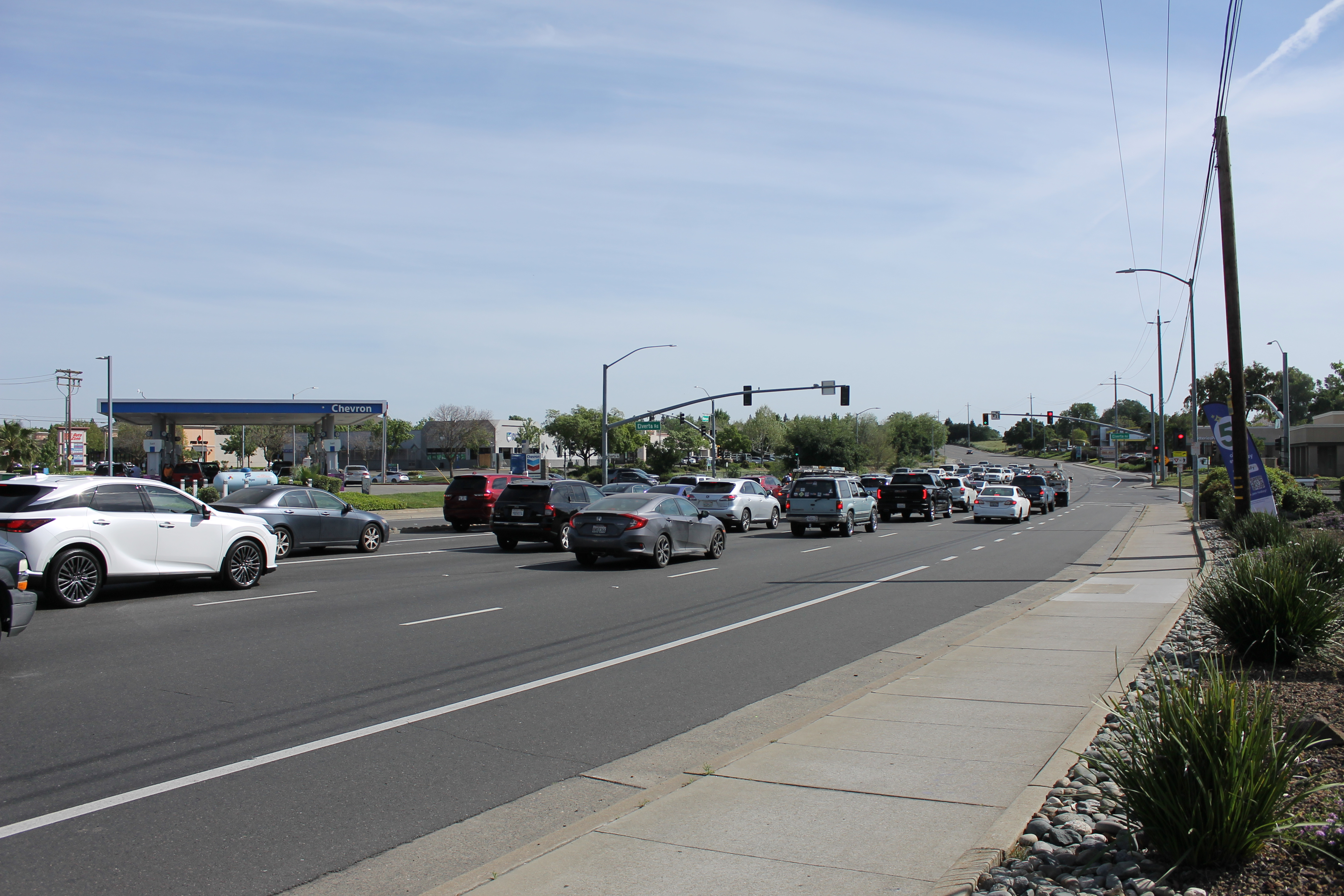
- The intersection of Walerga Road & Elverta Road.

- Location of Antelope in Sacramento County, California
- Coordinates: 38°42′55″N 121°21′39″W
- Country: United States
- State: California
- County: Sacramento

Area
  - Total: 6.84 sq mi (17.71 km^{2})
  - Land: 6.84 sq mi (17.71 km^{2})
  - Water: 0 sq mi (0.00 km^{2}) 0%
- Elevation: 121 ft (37 m)

Population (2020)
  - Total: 48,733
  - Density: 7,129/sq mi (2,752.5/km^{2})
- Time zone: UTC-10 (PST)
  - Summer (DST): UTC-9 (PST)
- ZIP codes: 95843
- Area codes: 916, 279
- FIPS code: 06-02210

Antelope is a census-designated place in Sacramento County, California, United States located approximately 15 miles (24 km) northeast of downtown Sacramento and 5 miles (8 km) southwest of Roseville. The population was 48,733 at the 2020 census.

== Geography ==
According to the United States Census Bureau, the community has a total area of 6.84 square miles (17.7 km^{2}), all land. Antelope is mostly flat, with very few hills and no major bodies of water.

The northern border of Antelope falls directly onto the line between Sacramento and Placer counties.

The eastern border first follows Roseville Road south from the county line to Butternut Drive, then continues in the same general direction to Antelope Road, so that parcels on Adagio Way, Andante Drive and Katella Way are within Antelope CDP.

The southern border follows Antelope Road.

The western border has two parts. The first part extends from Antelope Road northwards toward Elverta Road along 28th St. The second part extends from Elverta Road towards the Placer County line, along Dry Creek.

The boundaries were drawn and the town name established by a vote in 1993 to establish the community's identity. The Antelope town designation began July 1, 1994. The ZIP code for Antelope: 95843

== History ==
In the late 1800s, Antelope was the only significant settlement in the Center Township, an area bounded on the North by the Placer county line, on the East by what is now Sunrise Blvd., on the South by the American River, and on the West by the line along 20th St in Rio Linda south to Ethan Way in the Arden-Arcade area. The population of the entire township in 1880 was about 400 people. Many of the railroad workers made their homes here and eventually stayed permanently. Gradually, workers left the area and Antelope became just another small community with little business.

On April 28, 1973, Antelope consisted of a post office, general store and a half-dozen homes. However, at 8:03 a.m., a rail car loaded with aircraft bombs exploded in the southern part of the Southern Pacific's Roseville Yard, destroying the general store and damaging most of the homes. This event changed Antelope forever - it basically was blown away.

What is known as Antelope today mostly began as a planned community in the late 1980s. It consisted of mainly single-family homes and apartments. Due to the relative newness of the community, most homes are new and the area is well planned out. The proposed and ultimate closure of nearby McClellan Air Force Base between the years 1993-2001 did have a slowing-down economic impact upon this area (the “North Watt Avenue corridor”). Antelope received its own postmark and recognition as a community by the U.S. Postal Service on 1 July 1994.

== Demographics ==
Historical population
Census	Pop.	Note	%±
2010	45,770		—
2020	48,733		6.5%
U.S. Decennial Census; 1860–1870 1880-1890; 1900 1910 1920; 1930 1940 1950; 1960 1970 1980; 1990 2000 2010

Antelope first appeared as a census designated place in the 2010 U.S. census.

=== Racial and ethnic composition ===
Antelope CDP, California – Racial composition Note: the US Census treats Hispanic/Latino as an ethnic category. This table excludes Latinos from the racial categories and assigns them to a separate category. Hispanics/Latinos may be of any race.
Race (NH = Non-Hispanic)	% 2020	% 2010	Pop 2020	Pop 2010
White alone (NH)	52.2%	57.4%	25,451	26,268
Black alone (NH)	7.8%	8.4%	3,784	3,853
American Indian alone (NH)	0.6%	0.6%	277	261
Asian alone (NH)	13.9%	13%	6,753	5,949
Pacific Islander alone (NH)	0.8%	0.8%	398	370
Other race alone (NH)	0.6%	0.2%	288	75
Multiracial (NH)	7%	5.2%	3,393	2,359
Hispanic/Latino (any race)	17.2%	14.5%	8,389	6,635

=== 2020 census ===
As of the 2020 census, Antelope had a population of 48,733 and a population density of 7,128.9 inhabitants per square mile (2,752.5/km^{2}). 100.0% of residents lived in urban areas, while 0.0% lived in rural areas. The census reported that 99.8% of the population lived in households, 0.1% lived in non-institutionalized group quarters, and 0.1% were institutionalized.

The median age was 34.3 years; 27.1% of residents were under the age of 18, 9.9% were aged 18 to 24, 27.6% were aged 25 to 44, 24.9% were aged 45 to 64, and 10.5% were 65 years of age or older. For every 100 females there were 96.1 males, and for every 100 females age 18 and over there were 92.9 males age 18 and over.

There were 14,946 households; 44.1% had children under the age of 18 living in them. Of all households, 57.2% were married-couple households, 6.6% were cohabiting couple households, 23.2% had a female householder with no partner present, and 13.0% had a male householder with no partner present. 14.9% of households were made up of individuals and 6.0% had someone living alone who was 65 years of age or older. The average household size was 3.25, and there were 11,871 families (79.4% of all households).

There were 15,202 housing units, of which 1.7% were vacant. 68.5% were owner-occupied and 31.5% were occupied by renters. The homeowner vacancy rate was 0.5% and the rental vacancy rate was 2.5%.

The most reported ancestries were:

- Mexican (12.8%)
- English (10.3%)
- German (10.1%)
- Irish (9.8%)
- Ukrainian (8.4%)
- African American (6.7%)
- Filipino (5%)
- Russian (4.6%)
- Indian (4.5%)
- Italian (3.8%)

=== 2023 American Community Survey ===
In 2023, the US Census Bureau estimated that 25.7% of the population were foreign-born. Of all people aged 5 or older, 66.0% spoke only English at home, 5.0% spoke Spanish, 18.7% spoke other Indo-European languages, 7.9% spoke Asian or Pacific Islander languages, and 2.4% spoke other languages. Of those aged 25 or older, 89.0% were high school graduates and 24.3% had a bachelor's degree.

The median household income was $95,102, and the per capita income was $36,500. About 8.5% of families and 10.3% of the population were below the poverty line.

== Government ==
In the California State Legislature, Antelope is in the 6th senatorial district, represented by Republican Roger Niello, and in the 6th Assembly district, represented by Democrat Maggy Krell.

In the United States House of Representatives, Antelope is in California's 6th congressional district, represented by Democrat Ami Bera.

Since Antelope is an unincorporated part of Sacramento County, all non-traffic related law enforcement incidents are handled by the Sacramento County Sheriff's Department, stationed out of the North Division. All traffic related incidents occurring in unincorporated Antelope are handled by the California Highway Patrol North Sacramento Area Office. All of the Center Unified School District property is mainly patrolled by the Twin Rivers Unified School District Police Department via contract, while both the Sunrise Parks and Recreation District and the Rio Linda Elverta Recreation and Parks District have a contract with the Fulton-El Camino Park Police Department.

== Parks ==
Parks in Antelope are under the jurisdiction of the Sunrise Parks and Recreation District as well as the Rio Linda Elverta Recreation and Parks District, which are both policed under contract by the Fulton–El Camino Park Police Department.

=== Tetotom Park ===
Tetotom Park is located on the corner of Don Julio Blvd and North Loop Dr in Antelope near Antelope Crossing Middle School. It consists of a plastic playground, two tennis courts, a volleyball court, a multipurpose field, and a baseball diamond. It also contains four barbecues.

=== Pokelma Park ===
Pokelma Park is located on Quiet Knolls Drive off of Elverta Road (winco park) (behind WinCo Foods). It consists of a plastic playground, two tennis courts, a basketball court, and a baseball diamond.

=== Lone Oak Park ===
Lone Oak Park is at Elverta and Gray Mare Way, located directly next to Center High School, with a gate for students to enter from the park. It consists of a plastic playground updated with First 5 Grant money in 2009, swings with handicap access, a baseball field, a soccer field, with many benches and trees to sit under.

=== Blue Oak Park ===
Blue Oak Park is located at Big Cloud and Heathston Ct, south of Bel-Air Market (Big Cloud leads to a dead end at Old Walerga, which is blocked by a fence from both the park and Big Cloud). It consists of multiple plastic playground and a big, grassy field. There are no restrooms.

=== Northbrook Park (formerly Antelope Greens Park) ===
This park is located at Meadow Hawk and Tourmaline Way, which is in a neighborhood between Center High School and McClellan High School off Watt Ave. It is almost hidden to the public, behind some houses and the offskirts of a golf course (which is blocked by a huge fence). You cannot actually see the park from the streets, just the paved bike path and a big gate, which is closed and locked at night. The park contains one half-court basketball court. It is located directly next to Dry Creek, and on the other side of the creek lies Gibson Ranch. This park is not operated by Sunrise Parks and Recreation District. Locals call it Hidden Park.

=== Antelope Community Park ===
Antelope Community Park is mainly known as The Park of Dreams, which is the name listed on a painted wall in front of the park. It is located at 8012 Palmerson Drive, between a huge dirt field and the local fire station. The park formerly consisted of a wooden playground that has since been replaced with a plastic and metal playground offering several unique playsets. The park has a trail through the dirt field and many benches in the 34-acre (140,000 m^{2}) park.

=== Antelope Station Park ===
Antelope Station Park is a park for young children. Contains one small play set, a garden and some benches. It is located at 6306 Outlook Drive.

=== Almond Grove ===
Almond Grove is located at 7691 Eagle Point Way. It consists of a 4.5-acre (18,000 m^{2}) field with no playsets.

=== Firestone Park ===
Firestone park is a 7.5-acre (30,000 m^{2}) park located at 5415 Poker Lane near Olive Grove Elementary School. It consists of a baseball diamond, two basketball courts, a multipurpose field, a soccer field, benches, bike racks, BBQ and covered picnic tables. The park has children's playsets. This is also where the 2015 Antelope Little league Baseball champions The Braves practice.

=== Roseview Park ===
Roseview Park is a 7-acre (28,000 m^{2}) park located at 5848 Ridgepoint Drive. It consists of a play area, a BBQ, a garden area, a baseball diamond and a basketball court.

== Schools ==
The following a list of the schools serving Antelope:

=== Center Unified School District ===
==== Elementary schools (K-5) ====
- Oak Hill Elementary School
- Dudley Elementary School
- North Country Elementary School
- Spinelli Elementary School

==== Junior high schools ====
- Wilson C. Riles Middle School

==== High schools ====
- Center High School
- Antelope High School
- McClellan Continuation High School

==== Charter schools ====
- Antelope View Charter School (located at the lower part of the old Center Junior High School)
- Global Youth Charter School (Formerly located at the lower part of the old Center Junior High School. Permanently Closed since 2017.

=== Dry Creek Joint Elementary School District ===
==== Elementary schools (K-5) ====
- Antelope Meadows Elementary
- Barrett Ranch Elementary
- Olive Grove Elementary
- Heritage Oak Elementary
- Coyote Ridge Elementary
- Quail Glen Elementary
- Dry Creek Elementary

==== Junior high schools (6-8) ====
- Antelope Crossing Middle School
- Creekview Ranch Middle School
- Silverado Middle School

=== Roseville Joint Union High School District ===
- Antelope High School

== Utilities ==
Sacramento Municipal Utility District provides electric service to the area and PG&E provides natural gas service. Antelope is served by Consolidated Communications, Comcast, and AT&T for its telephone and Internet needs. Not all three providers are available in all areas of the city.
