= Cosumnes =

Cosumnes may refer to

- Cosumnes River in northern California, United States
- Cosumnes River Preserve near Sacramento, California
- Cosumnes River AVA, an American Viticultural Area in Sacramento County and San Joaquin County
- Cosumnes River College in Sacramento, California
- Cosumnes River College (Sacramento RT) a light rail station in Sacramento, California
- Cosumnes Oaks High School in Elk Grove, California
- Rancho Cosumnes in Sacramento County, California
