= Rancho Omochumnes =

Mexican land grant in Sacramento County, California

Coordinates: 38.450°N 121.260°W

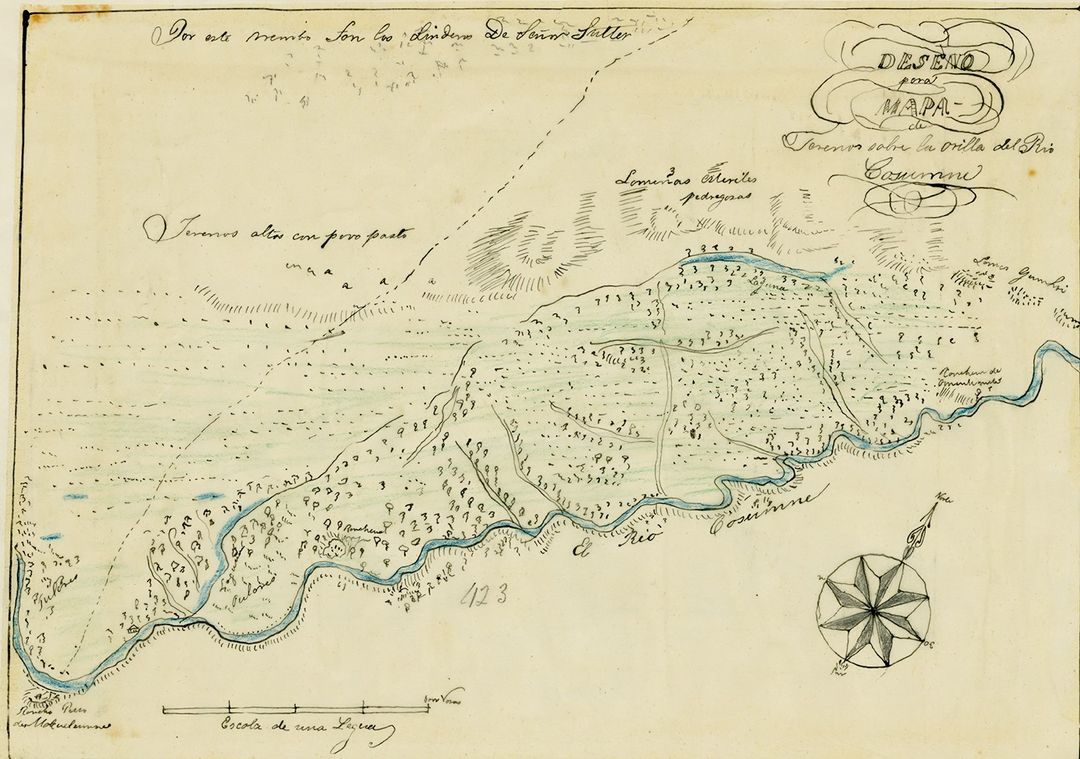
1844 map of the Rancho Omochumnes Land Grant

Rancho Omochumnes, also known as "Rancho Río de los Cosumnes al Norte", was a 18,662-acre (75.52 km^{2}) Mexican land grant in present-day Sacramento County, California.

It was granted in 1844 by Governor Manuel Micheltorena to Jared Dixon Sheldon. The grant extended about 17 miles (27 km) along the north bank of the Cosumnes River, opposite Rancho Cosumnes, and encompassed present day city of Elk Grove and town of Sheldon, south of Sacramento.

== History ==
Jared Dixon (Joaquín) Sheldon (1813–1851) was born in Vermont and came to California in 1839. He spent one season in sea-otter hunting, and then worked building a house in Monterey. He formed a partnership with William Daylor (1810–1850). In 1844, Sheldon built a flour mill (gristmill) at the Russian settlement of Fort Ross and another mill in San Jose. Sheldon was granted the five square league Rancho Omochumnes in 1844. He did some building work for John Marsh and obtained three hundred head of cattle in exchange.

In 1845 Sheldon permanently settled on his ranch, which had been attended to by William Daylor. Originally was known as the Sheldon Grant, the rancho was divided into Sheldon's Ranch, and Daylor's Ranch. In 1846 Sheldon's flour mill (gristmill) on the Cosumnes was in operation. In 1847, Sheldon married Catherine Rhoads (1832–1905) and Daylor married her sister, Sarah Rhoads (1830–1898). William Daylor died of cholera in 1850. In 1851 Sheldon erected a dam near Clark's Bar for the irrigation of his lands. He was shot July 11, 1851 in a quarrel over a dam he had built that flooded miners' claims.

With the cession of California to the United States following the Mexican-American War, the 1848 Treaty of Guadalupe Hidalgo provided that the land grants would be honored. As required by the Land Act of 1851, a claim for Rancho Omochumnes was filed with the Public Land Commission in 1852, and the grant was patented to his widow, Catherine Rhoads Sheldon and the administrator of the estate, Gabriel W. Gunn in 1870.

In 1852 Catherine married John T.R. Mahone, who had been a soldier in the Mexican-American War. In 1872, Catherine married Dennis Dalton (1846–1908), a young Irishman who came to California in 1869. They settled on Rancho Omochumnes, where Catherine remained (almost) until her death in 1905.

== Historic sites of the Rancho ==
- The rancho's flour mill site is a California Historical Landmark, registered as Site of Grist Mill built by Jared Dixon Sheldon (1846–1847). Its historical marker is located near the intersection of Meiss Road and CA Hwy 16.

== See also ==
- List of California Ranchos
- Ranchos of Sacramento County, California
- Cosumnes River topics
