= David Freitas =

American baseball player (born 1989)

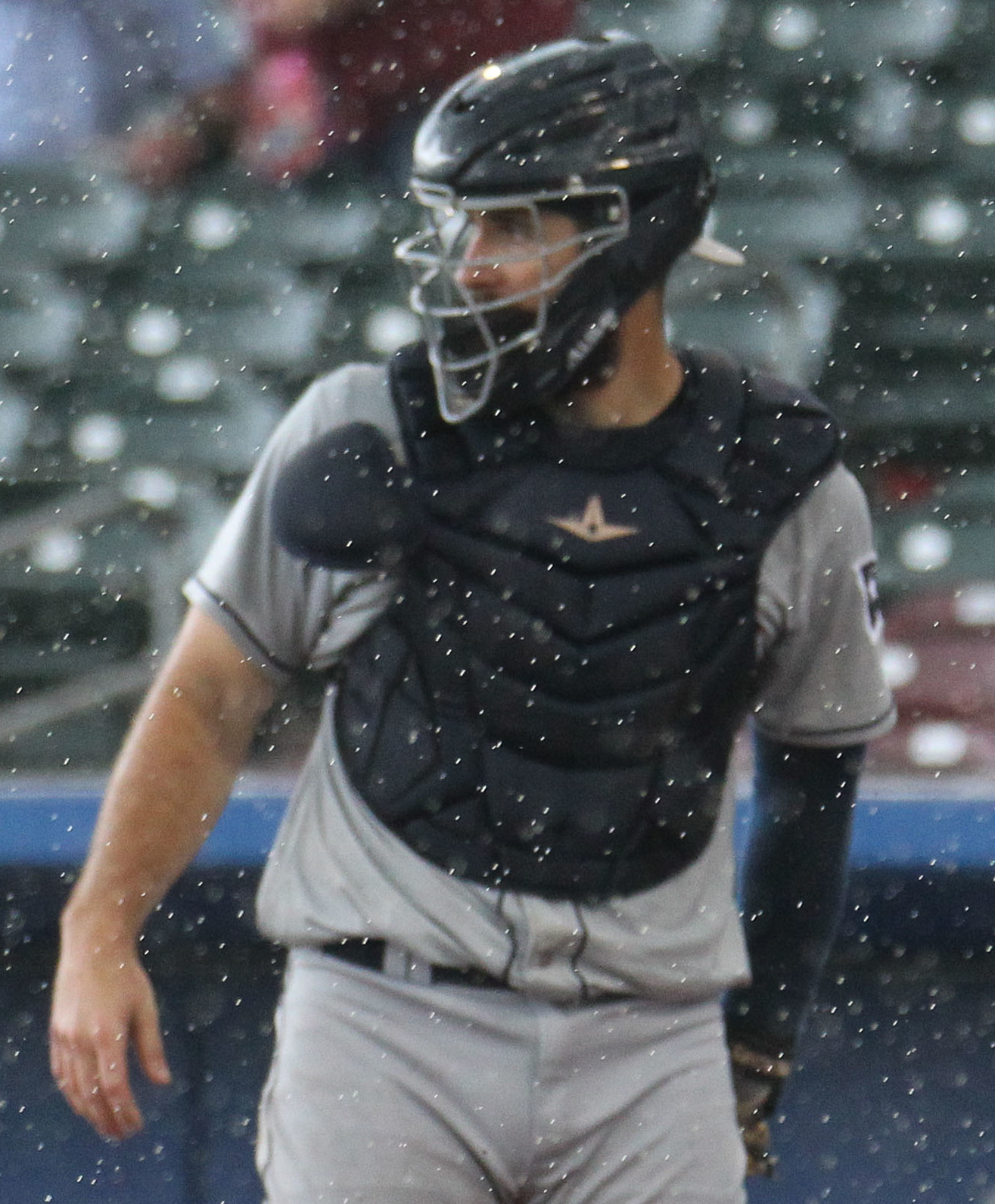
- Freitas with the San Antonio Missions in 2019
- Catcher
- Born: March 18, 1989 (age 37); Wilton, California, U.S.
- Batted: Right Threw: Right

Professional debut
- MLB: August 30, 2017, for the Atlanta Braves
- KBO: April 3, 2021, for the Kiwoom Heroes

Last appearance
- MLB: September 29, 2019, for the Milwaukee Brewers
- KBO: June 17, 2021, for the Kiwoom Heroes

MLB statistics
- Batting average: .200
- Home runs: 1
- Runs batted in: 8

KBO statistics
- Batting average: .259
- Home runs: 2
- Runs batted in: 14
- Stats at Baseball Reference

Teams
- Atlanta Braves (2017); Seattle Mariners (2018–2019); Milwaukee Brewers (2019); Kiwoom Heroes (2021)

David Joseph Freitas (FRAY-tuss; born March 18, 1989) is an American former professional baseball catcher. He played in Major League Baseball (MLB) for the Atlanta Braves, Seattle Mariners, and Milwaukee Brewers, and in the KBO League for the Kiwoom Heroes.

== Career ==
=== Early career ===
Freitas was born in Wilton, California. He attended Elk Grove High School in Elk Grove, California, and then Cosumnes River College, where he played college baseball for two years, earning All-American honors. He then transferred to the University of Hawaii, where he played one year of baseball with the Hawaii Rainbow Warriors.

=== Washington Nationals ===
The Washington Nationals selected Freitas in the 15th round of the 2010 Major League Baseball draft. Playing for the Hagerstown Suns of the Single-A South Atlantic League in 2011, he started in the All-Star game. Freitas began the 2012 season with the Potomac Nationals of the High-A Carolina League.

=== Oakland Athletics ===
On August 3, 2012, the Nationals traded Freitas to the Athletics for Kurt Suzuki. He split the 2013 season between the Midland RockHounds of the Double-A Texas League and the Sacramento River Cats of the Triple-A Pacific Coast League (PCL), hitting a cumulative .231/.306/.368 slash line with 10 home runs and 30 RBI over 90 games.

=== Baltimore Orioles ===
The Athletics traded Freitas to the Baltimore Orioles on December 12, 2013, as the player to be named later in trade that also sent Jemile Weeks to the Orioles for Jim Johnson.

Freitas played for the Bowie Baysox of the Double-A Eastern League and Norfolk Tides of the Triple-A International League in 2014, hitting a combined .263/.350/.421 with six home runs and 29 RBI over 61 games. He returned to Bowie and Norfolk in 2015, hitting .241/.299/.387 with eight home runs and 33 RBI across 75 total contests.

=== Chicago Cubs ===
On December 10, 2015, the Chicago Cubs selected Freitas in the minor league phase of the Rule 5 draft. He began the 2016 season with the Tennessee Smokies of the Double-A Southern League. He was later promoted to the Iowa Cubs of the PCL. In 91 total appearances, Freitas slashed .295/.349/.437 with six home runs and 53 RBI. He elected free agency following the season on November 7.

=== Atlanta Braves ===
On November 11, 2016, Freitas signed a minor league contract with the Atlanta Braves. He played for the Gwinnett Braves of the International League. The Braves promoted Freitas to the major leagues on August 30, 2017, and he made his major league debut in the second game of a double header against the Philadelphia Phillies that same day. Freitas got his first major league hit, a double in his second at-bat.

=== Seattle Mariners ===
On October 27, 2017, the Seattle Mariners claimed Freitas off of waivers. In 2018 for Seattle, Freitas batted .215 in 36 games. Freitas began the 2019 season with the Triple-A Tacoma Rainiers and batted 0-for-3 with a walk for the Mariners.

=== Milwaukee Brewers ===
On April 14, 2019, the Mariners traded Freitas to the Milwaukee Brewers in exchange for Sal Biasi. The Brewers assigned Freitas to the San Antonio Missions of the PCL. Splitting the season with the Tacoma Rainiers and San Antonio, Freitas won the Pacific Coast League batting title with a .387 average in 91 games in the PCL. He also appeared in 16 major league games for Milwaukee, batting 1-for-13.

=== Kiwoom Heroes ===
On February 5, 2021, Freitas signed a one-year, $600,000 deal with the Kiwoom Heroes of the KBO League. He played in 43 games for Kiwoom, slashing .259/.297/.374 with two home runs and 14 RBI

=== Tampa Bay Rays ===
On July 24, 2021, Freitas signed a minor league contract with the Tampa Bay Rays.

Freitas spent the 2021 season with the Triple-A Durham Bulls. He played in 16 games, hitting .245 with three RBI. Freitas became a free agent following the season.

=== New York Yankees ===
On December 23, 2021, Freitas signed a minor league contract with the New York Yankees. He played for the Scranton/Wilkes-Barre RailRiders in 2022 and was released in July.

=== Los Angeles Dodgers ===
On January 5, 2023, Freitas signed a minor league contract with the Los Angeles Dodgers organization. He played in 29 games for the Triple-A Oklahoma City Dodgers, batting .295 with five homers and 26 RBI. He elected free agency following the season on November 6.

== Personal life ==
Freitas grew up a fan of the Athletics. He and his wife have two sons and reside in Wilton, California. His mother owns a pig farm in Wilton.
