= Sheldon Gristmill =

Historical Landmark in Sloughhouse, United States

Sheldon Grist Mill Site
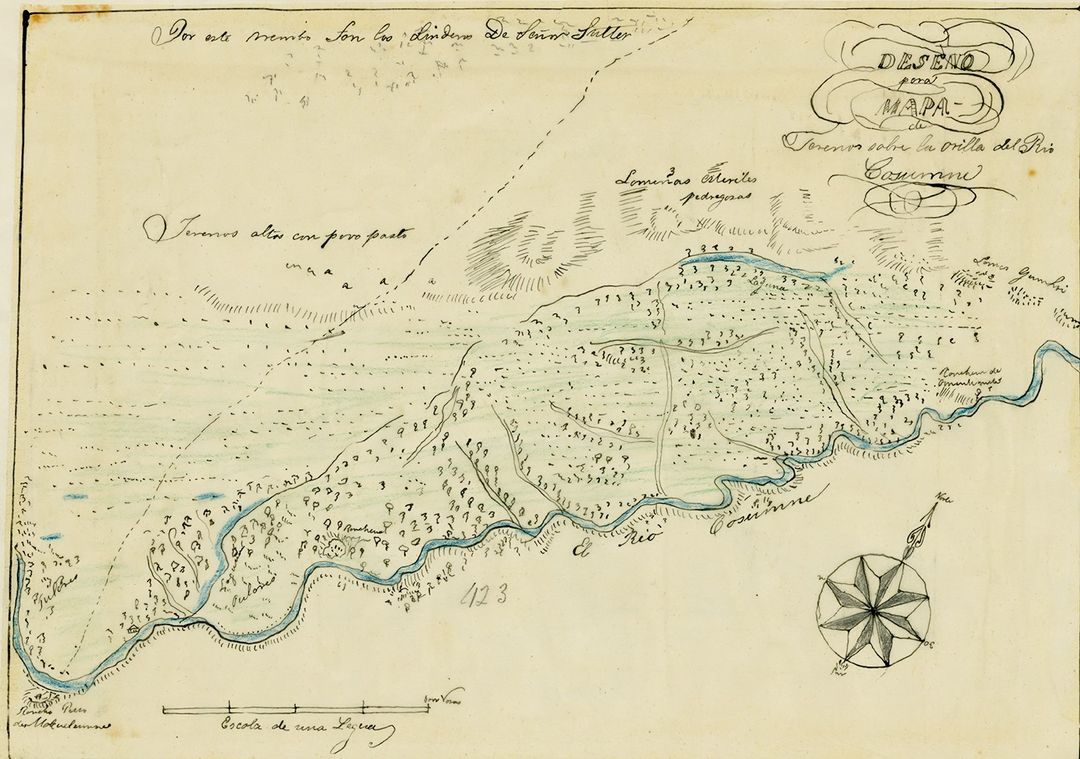
- 1844 Map of Sheldon's Rancho Omochumnes Land Grant

- Location within California Location within the United States
- 38.496°N 121.197°W
- Location: Meiss Rd and Hwy 16; Rancho Omochumnes; Sloughhouse, California

History
- Built: 1843

California Historical Landmark
- Designated: June 2, 1949
- Reference no.: 439

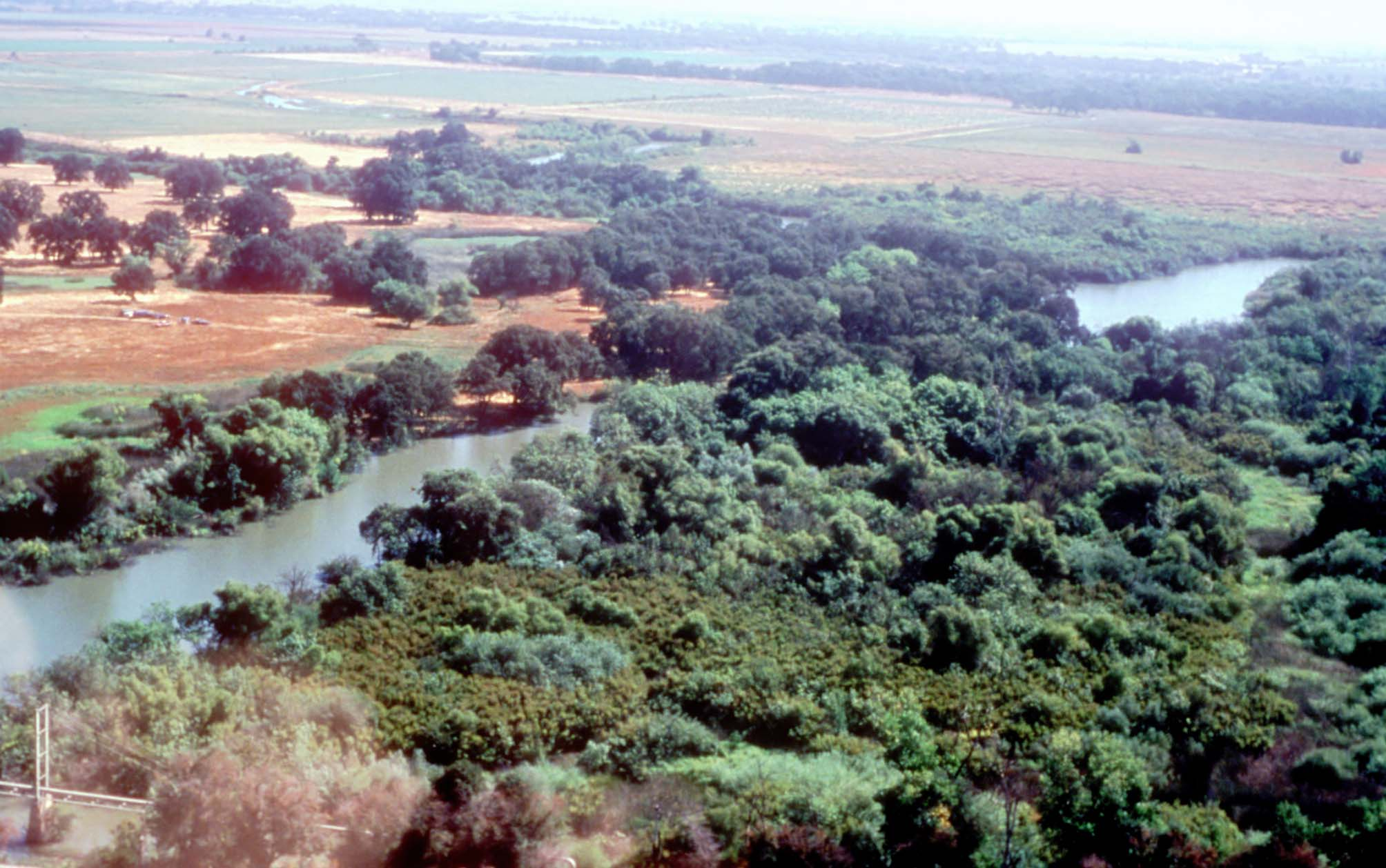
Cosumnes River near Sheldon Gristmill

Sheldon Grist Mill Site, is historical site in Sloughhouse, California in Sacramento County. The site is a California Historical Landmark No. 604 listed on June 2, 1949. The water powered gristmill, was used turn grain into flour, was on Rancho Omochumnes. The gristmill was built by Jared Dixon (Joaquin) Sheldon. Sheldon was grant then five square league (22,130 acres) of land on Rancho Omochumnes by the First Mexican Republic in 1843 by Mexican Governor Manuel Micheltorena as payment for carpenter work on the Monterey Custom House. Sheldon born on January 8, 1813, in Vermont and travelled to California 1832, working as a carpenter and millwright. Sheldon married Catherine Rhoads, the daughters of Thomas Rhoads in March 1847. Sheldon and his partner, William Daylor, also did some gold mining. Sheldon built a dam on Clark's Bar river on his Sheldon Grant to irrigate the crops on his lands. The dam flooded a California Gold Rush miners' claim. The angry miners' shot Sheldon on July 11, 1851. The conflict with Sheldon and the miners is called the Riot on the Cosumnes. In the conflict Sheldon was not the only one shot. Also Killed was James M. Johnson of Lancaster, Iowa and Edward Cody of Fox River, Illinois. Three were wounded: Calvin Dickerson of Berrien County, Michigan, Emanuel Bush of Des Moines County, Iowa and one unnamed miner. The Sheldon Grant was boarded on the south by the Cosumnes River and north by Deer Creek, 17 miles long between the rivers. The Sheldon Grist Mill was just west of the Sloughhouse Pioneer Cemetery, where Sheldon and his partner William Daylor and are buried. The site today is still mostly farmland.

A California Historical Landmark was place at the site by the California Centennials Commission. The marker foundation was built by Liberty Parlor No. 213 of the Native Daughters of the Golden West and Elk Grove Parlor No. 41 of the Native Sons of the Golden West. The marker was dedicated on September 26, 1997, near Meiss Road and CA Hwy 16.

A Riot on the Cosumnes historical marker is in Sheldon, California, placed there in 2001 by New Helvetia Chapter No.5, E Clampus Vitus, working Douglas & Barbara Silva, owner of the Silva's Sheldon Inn.

== See also ==
- California Historical Landmarks in Sacramento County
