= Rancho Todos Santos y San Antonio =

Land grant in California

Coordinates: 34.790°N 120.470°W

Rancho Todos Santos y San Antonio was a 20,772-acre (84.06 km^{2}) Mexican land grant in present-day Santa Barbara County, California given in 1841 by Governor Juan B. Alvarado to William Edward Petty Hartnell. The grant extended along San Antonio Creek and encompassed present-day Orcutt., northwest of Lompoc

== History ==
W. E. P. Hartnell (1798–1854) received the five square league Rancho Todos Santos y San Antonio grant from Alvarado in appreciation of Hartnell’s service as Inspector General of Missions (visitador de misiones) after the secularization of the Missions. In 1841, Hartnell sold his Rancho El Alisal in Monterey County to Governor Alvarado, and moved with his family to Rancho Todos Santos y San Antonio. Hartnell was married to Maria Teresa de la Guerra, the daughter of José de la Guerra y Noriega, the richest and most influential man in the Santa Barbara area at the time. In 1844, Hartnell also obtained the eleven square league Rancho Cosumnes from Governor Manuel Micheltorena.

With the cession of California to the United States following the Mexican-American War, the 1848 Treaty of Guadalupe Hidalgo provided that the land grants would be honored. As required by the Land Act of 1851, a claim for Rancho Todos Santos y San Antonio was filed with the Public Land Commission in 1852 and the grant was patented to W. E. P. Hartnell in 1876.

When Hartnell died in 1854, Maria Teresa de la Guerra de Hartnell and the 11 children inherited the rancho. Hartnell wrote in his will - "My principal object is to prevent any member of the law from having anything whatsover to do with my property or with my executors or heirs." Maria Teresa de la Guerra’s brother, Pablo de la Guerra was administrator of the estate.

In 1879 Henry Mayo Newhall, acquired 7,000 acres (28.3 km^{2}) of Rancho Todos Santos y San Antonio, that became part of the Newhall Land and Farming Company.

Part of the land was acquired by the US military and is now Vandenberg Space Force Base.

== See also ==
- Ranchos of California
- List of Ranchos of California
