= William Edward Petty Hartnell =

California pioneer (1798–1854)

William E. P. Hartnell Guillermo Arnel
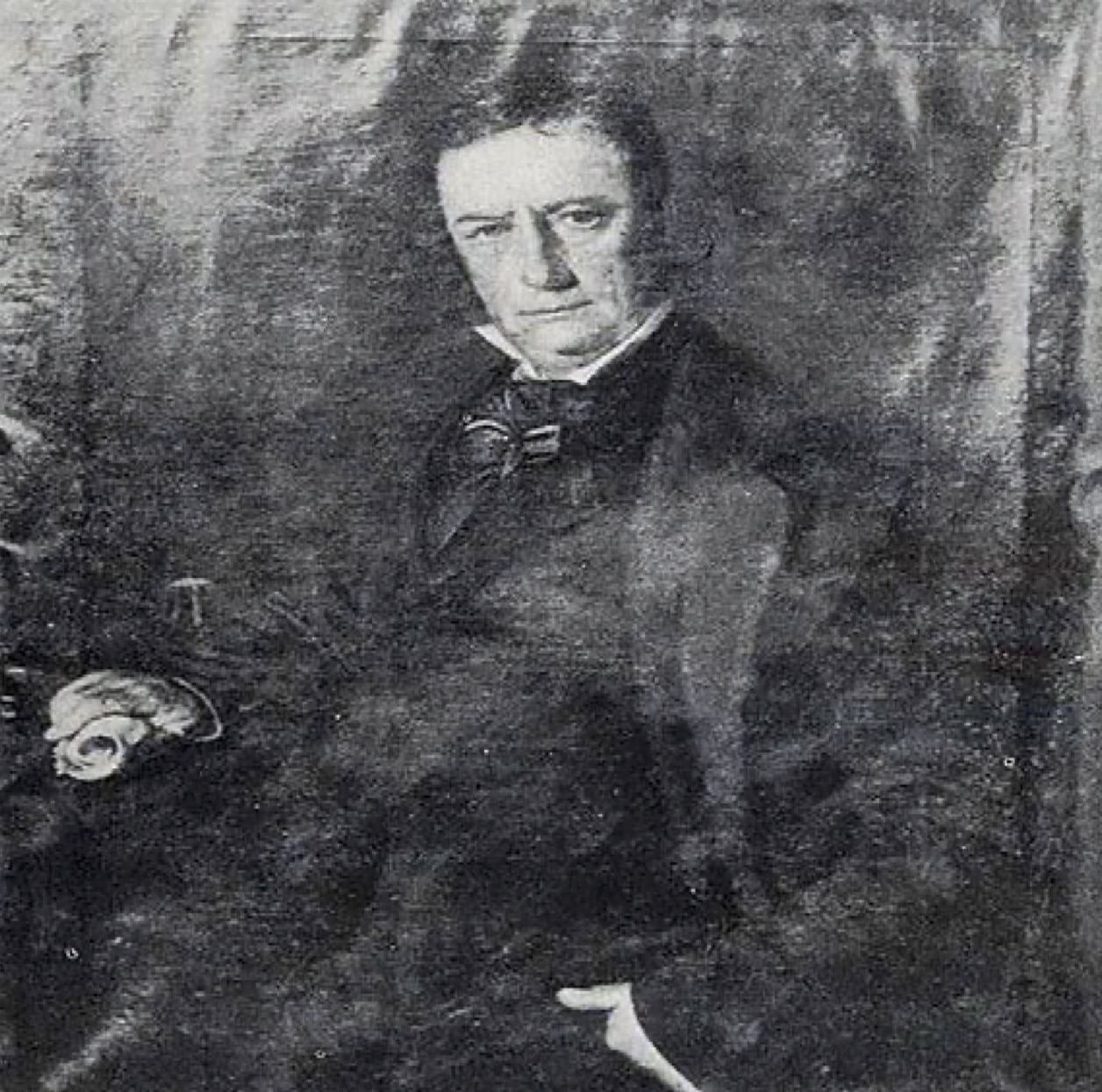
- Portrait by Leonardo Barbieri, 1853
- Born: April 24, 1798; Backbarrow, England
- Died: February 2, 1854 (aged 55)
- Citizenship: United Kingdom; Mexico; United States
- Known for: Namesake of Hartnell College
- Spouse: Teresa de la Guerra (m. 1825)
- Children: 25
- Relatives: José de la Guerra y Noriega (father-in-law)

William Edward Petty Hartnell (April 24, 1798 – February 2, 1854), later known by his Spanish name Don Guillermo Arnel, was a merchant, schoolmaster, and government official in California. He arrived in California in 1822 as a trader, where he married into the prominent Guerra family of California and became a Mexican citizen. He held several public roles during the Mexican era and after the American Conquest of California, notably serving as the official translator at the Monterey Constitutional Convention.

== Early life ==
William Petty Hartnell was born to a middle-class family in Lancaster, England in 1798. His father died in 1807 when he was eight years old. His mother, who was from an affluent Westmorland family.

Hartnell attended the College of Commerce in Bremen, Germany and then went to Chile in 1819 to work in the Santiago office of John Begg & Co., a firm where another uncle, Edward Petty, had helped him secure a job. With the waning of Spanish power in the region, the Scottish trading company gradually expanded its commercial activities from Valparaíso to Callao and other ports on the northern Pacific coast of South America. A colleague, Hugh McCulloch, persuaded him to become partners in a California hide trade venture, with backing from their employer John Begg. They established a new trading company in 1822 called McCulloch and Hartnell, commonly called Macala y Arnel. It was at this time that he adopted the named "Arnel," as it was easier for the Spanish language-speaking residents to pronounce.

== Arrival in Alta California ==
The pair arrived in Monterey in 1822, the first foreign traders to arrive there since Mexico obtained its independence from Spanish rule in 1821, and after obtaining permission from Governor Pablo Vicente de Solá to permit them as British subjects to do business and live in Alta California they visited the Californian missions and signed an exclusive trading contract with the majority of them for three years from the beginning of January 1823. The contract obliged them to take 25,000 arrobas of tallow yearly and as many cattle hides as the missions could provide. Hartnell served as resident manager in California, while McCulloch managed the business overall from Callao. In 1823, Macala Y Arnel established the Casa de San Pedro, a hide house in the port of San Pedro, which they later sold in 1829.

After overcoming early problems with the quality of shipments, the venture was profitable by 1825. However, as their exclusive contract ended in the same year, they faced competition from American merchants. Their financial backer, John Begg, also began to suffer trading difficulties and after a meeting of the three partners in Lima the partnership was dissolved in 1828. There was a deficit of nearly $30,000 and Hartnell struggled to repay his substantial share of this, with McCulloch still seeking payment from Hartnell in 1831.Hartnell finally received his discharge from his liability to Begg and McCulloch in 1833, after Scottish trader Dr. Stephen Anderson agreed to take on the responsibility for the debts in return for the goodwill of Hartnell's business in California.

== Marriage ==
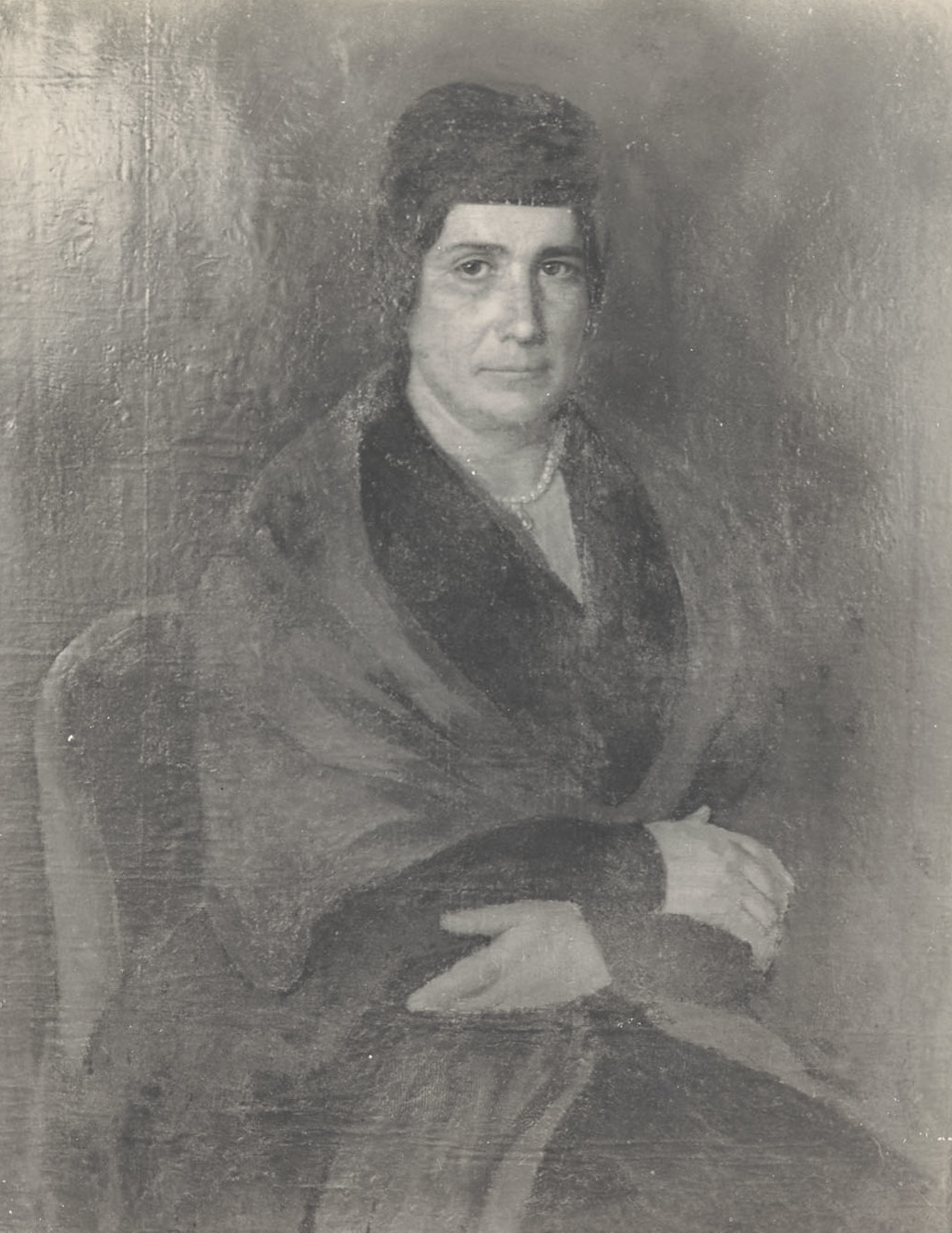
Teresa de la Guerra de Hartnell, a member of the prominent Guerra family of California and Hartnell's wife. Portrait by Leonardo Barbieri, 1853.

After learning that his benefactor uncle, from whom he had stolen money, was in straitened circumstances and poor health Hartnell suffered a crisis of conscience and began drinking heavily. A Catholic priest, Father Luis Martínez, helped him through these times, and as a result, Hartnell converted to Catholicism. He was baptized on October 13, 1824, and at the same time he added his uncle's name to his own. On April 30, 1825, Hartnell married 16-year-old Maria Teresa de la Guerra, daughter of Don José de la Guerra y Noriega, patriarch of the Guerra family of California and one of the richest and most influential men in Southern California. They moved to Monterey in June. During their twenty-five years of marriage, they had twenty sons and five daughters. One son was named Nathaniel after Hartnell's younger brother who was an artist of some note in England. During this time, he also served as a tutor to prominent families in the area, with Juan Bautista Alvarado and Mariano Guadalupe Vallejo as two of his more notable charges.

== Occupations ==
In 1832 Hartnell was elected leader of the Compañia de Extranjeros, a militia of foreign residents, formed at the request of Commandant Agustín V. Zamorano to maintain order in Monterey during unrest and disturbances.

He became a Mexican citizen in 1830, making him eligible to own land. By May 1833, he was no longer involved in the hide and tallow business and he was looking for a new venture. He entered into partnership with Feliciano and Mariano Soberanes, taking control of Rancho El Alisal in December, 1833.

During the 1820's, Hartnell maintained communication with representatives of the Russian-American Company, having acted as an intermediary between them and the Mexican authorities on several occasions. In August 1833, Hartnell was invited to visit Fort Ross on the North Coast, to discuss formally becoming a representative of Russian interests in Alta California, however nothing came of the discussions.

On December 10, 1833, he announced he was opening a school named "El Seminario del Patrocínio de San José" or "Colegio de San José" (for short), hoping to make a living as a schoolmaster. This school was financially supported by José Figueroa, the Governor of Alta California. Classes were initially held in Hartnell's house, but later moved to other buildings on Rancho El Alisal. Catholic priest Patrick Short taught at the school. It was shut down in 1836 after the death of Governor Figueroa. An 1836 census that Hartnell was employed to undertake shows that the school had thirteen students at that time, between the ages of 8 and 16.

Hartnell later held several municipal and government posts including regidor, collector of taxes and customs duties, tithe collector and court clerk. He was also appointed Inspector of the Missions in January 1839 but encountered opposition from administrators, Zacatecan padres, military officials and rancheros which led to his resignation from the post in September 1840. Whilst carrying out his inspection at Mission San Rafael Arcángel, he was arrested by his former pupil Mariano Guadalupe Vallejo who accused him of interfering in matters concerning the northern frontier without his consent.

In 1841, he was granted Rancho Todos Santos y San Antonio by Alvarado. He sold Rancho El Alisal to Alvarado in 1841, and moved with his family to Santa Barbara. In 1844 he was also granted Rancho Cosumnes by Governor Manuel Micheltorena.

In February 1845, Governor Pío Pico relieved Hartnell of all government posts, in retaliation for Hartnell's dismissing of him as administrator of Mission San Luis Rey. However, Hartnell's brother-in-law Pablo de la Guerra was able to secure him a job establishing a treasury in the city of Yerba Buena (modern San Francisco).

A regular correspondent of Hartnell's during this period was Robert Crichton Wyllie, with whom he conspired to obtain land grants in California for British colonists, though the idea never came to fruition. In March 1845 the British Prime Minister denied in Parliament that there was any foundation for rumours of British ambitions in California.

== Post-Conquest period ==
After the American Conquest of California, Hartnell served in various functions for the interim governments of California. Being one of the few people who could speak both English and Spanish fluently, he played an important role in the transition from Mexican to American rule. As the official government translator, his salary was two thousand dollars per annum. In 1849, he translated the Mexican laws published in 1837, along with Henry Halleck, as they still had legal relevance until statehood in 1850.

In November 1848, when some 400 refugees arrived in Monterey from Baja California, he served as the agent in relation to their claim for compensation from the American government. During this period he shared an office with then lieutenant William Tecumseh Sherman, who had accompanied Hartnell and Thomas O. Larkin in rowing out to meet the SS California when it arrived in Monterey in 1849. Hartnell later employed Sherman to survey his Rancho Cosumnes. Hartnell's tenure in the role ended in December 1849, when Bennet C. Riley retired.

Hartnell served as the official translator at the Monterey Constitutional Convention in 1849. He continued to translate laws between English and Spanish following statehood.

== Legacy ==
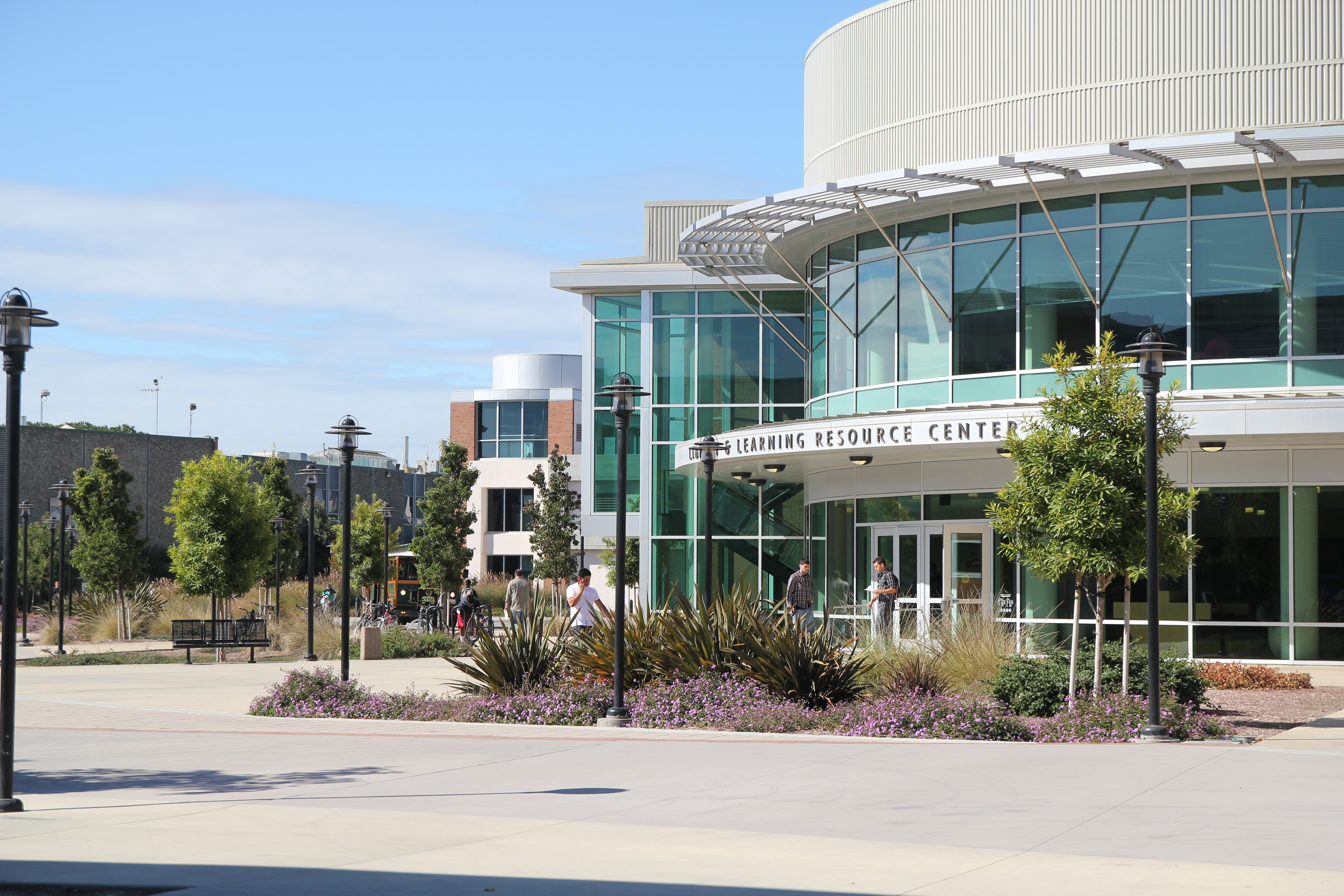
Hartnell College in Salinas, CA

Hartnell College in Salinas, as well as its school district, Hartnell Junior College District, bears his name. The school was renamed from Salinas Junior College in 1948 to Hartnell College.

There are two parks that bear Hartnell's name: Hartnell Gulch Park in Monterey and Hartnell Park in Salinas. There is a Hartnell Street in Monterey and a Hartnell Road in Salinas.
