= Mokelumne City, California =

Coordinates: 38°15′11″N 121°26′21″W

Mokelumne City
- Former settlement
- Interactive map of Mokelumne City
- Country: United States
- State: California
- County: San Joaquin County

California Historical Landmark
- Reference no.: 162

Mokelumne City (Mokelumne, Miwok for "People of the Fish Net") is a ghost town in San Joaquin County, California, United States. Mokelumne, established in 1850, was the second largest town in San Joaquin County until it was destroyed by the floods of 1862.

Mokelumne City arose as a rival trade centre to Stockton in 1850, near the mouth of the Cosumnes River, at the confluence of the Cosumnes and Mokelumne Rivers. Sloops built there ran direct to San Francisco. It rose to poll 172 votes, but the Great Flood of 1862 so ravaged the place that it never recovered. After the flood, a group of speculators led by an engineer named G.C. Holman, attempted to revive interest in the area with their plans of draining the Mokelumne River and reclaiming the land, as was done in the Netherlands and Poland previously.

The site of the former city is located about 14 miles north-west of Lodi, California. It is 200 feet north of the intersection of Cameron Road and Thornton Road, 3 miles north of Thornton, California.
