= Rancho Murieta, California =

Rancho Murieta
- census-designated place
- Location in Sacramento County and the state of California
- Coordinates: 38°30′11″N 121°5′5″W
- Country: United States
- State: California
- County: Sacramento

Area
  - Total: 12.064 sq mi (31.25 km^{2})
  - Land: 11.883 sq mi (30.78 km^{2})
  - Water: 0.181 sq mi (0.47 km^{2}) 1.50%
- Elevation: 167 ft (51 m)

Population (2020)
  - Total: 5,903
  - Density: 496.8/sq mi (191.8/km^{2})
- Time zone: UTC-8 (PST)
  - Summer (DST): UTC-7 (PDT)
- ZIP code: 95683
- Area codes: 916, 279
- FIPS code: 06-59506
- GNIS feature ID: 1820537

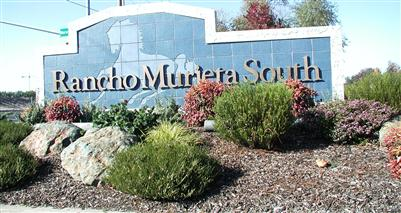
Rancho Murieta South Entrance Sign.

Rancho Murieta is a census-designated place (CDP) and guard-gated community in Sacramento County, California, United States. It is part of the Sacramento–Arden-Arcade–Roseville Metropolitan Statistical Area. The population was 5,903 at the 2020 census, up from 5,488 at the 2010 census. It is located in the foothills of the Sierra Nevada range, about 25 miles (40 km) east of Sacramento.

== Geography ==
According to the United States Census Bureau, the CDP has a total area of 12.1 square miles (31 km^{2}), of which 11.9 square miles (31 km^{2}) is land and 0.2 square miles (0.52 km^{2}) (1.50%) is water. The principal east–west access route is California State Route 16, also known as Jackson Road (or the Jackson Highway), which connects Rancho Murieta with the Sacramento metropolitan area to its west and to Amador County and the world-famous Shenandoah wine regions to the east. Rancho Murieta contains three reservoirs including Calero, Chesbro, and Clementia which pump in water from the nearby Consumnes River.

== Demographics ==
Historical population
Census	Pop.	Note	%±
1990	2,336		—
2000	4,193		79.5%
2010	5,488		30.9%
2020	5,903		7.6%
U.S. Decennial Census; 1990 2000 2010

=== 2020 census ===
As of the 2020 census, Rancho Murieta had a population of 5,903 and a population density of 496.8 inhabitants per square mile (191.8/km^{2}). The Census reported that the whole population lived in households.

Racial composition as of the 2020 census
Race	Number	Percent
White	4,689	79.4%
Black or African American	159	2.7%
American Indian and Alaska Native	39	0.7%
Asian	233	3.9%
Native Hawaiian and Other Pacific Islander	12	0.2%
Some other race	161	2.7%
Two or more races	610	10.3%
Hispanic or Latino (of any race)	617	10.5%

There were 2,499 households, of which 24.8% had children under the age of 18 living in them. Of all households, 67.5% were married-couple households, 3.0% were cohabiting-couple households, 9.7% were households with a male householder and no spouse or partner present, and 19.8% were households with a female householder and no spouse or partner present. About 19.2% of all households were made up of individuals and 14.4% had someone living alone who was 65 years of age or older. The average household size was 2.36, and there were 1,943 families (77.8% of all households).

The age distribution was 17.9% under the age of 18, 5.3% aged 18 to 24, 13.2% aged 25 to 44, 30.5% aged 45 to 64, and 33.1% who were 65 years of age or older. The median age was 54.5 years. For every 100 females, there were 92.4 males, and for every 100 females age 18 and over there were 91.2 males age 18 and over.

There were 2,611 housing units at an average density of 219.7 units per square mile (84.8 units/km^{2}); 2,499 units (95.7%) were occupied and 112 (4.3%) were vacant. Of occupied units, 91.6% were owner-occupied and 8.4% were occupied by renters. The homeowner vacancy rate was 2.0% and the rental vacancy rate was 6.6%.

0.0% of residents lived in urban areas, while 100.0% lived in rural areas.

=== 2010 census ===
The 2010 United States census reported that Rancho Murieta had a population of 5,488. The population density was 454.8 inhabitants per square mile (175.6/km^{2}). The racial makeup of Rancho Murieta was 4,874 (88.8%) White, 130 (2.4%) African American, 33 (0.6%) Native American, 158 (2.9%) Asian, 6 (0.1%) Pacific Islander, 81 (1.5%) from other races, and 206 (3.8%) from two or more races. Hispanic or Latino of any race were 425 persons (7.7%).

The Census reported that 5,488 people (100% of the population) lived in households, 0 (0%) lived in non-institutionalized group quarters, and 0 (0%) were institutionalized.

There were 2,301 households, out of which 617 (26.8%) had children under the age of 18 living in them, 1,589 (69.1%) were opposite-sex married couples living together, 126 (5.5%) had a female householder with no husband present, 57 (2.5%) had a male householder with no wife present. There were 70 (3.0%) unmarried opposite-sex partnerships, and 15 (0.7%) same-sex married couples or partnerships. 454 households (19.7%) were made up of individuals, and 253 (11.0%) had someone living alone who was 65 years of age or older. The average household size was 2.39. There were 1,772 families (77.0% of all households); the average family size was 2.72.

The population was spread out, with 1,135 people (20.7%) under the age of 18, 189 people (3.4%) aged 18 to 24, 981 people (17.9%) aged 25 to 44, 1,856 people (33.8%) aged 45 to 64, and 1,327 people (24.2%) who were 65 years of age or older. The median age was 50.8 years. For every 100 females, there were 93.9 males. For every 100 females age 18 and over, there were 91.9 males.

There were 2,436 housing units at an average density of 201.9 per square mile (78.0/km^{2}), of which 2,051 (89.1%) were owner-occupied, and 250 (10.9%) were occupied by renters. The homeowner vacancy rate was 2.7%; the rental vacancy rate was 6.0%. 4,836 people (88.1% of the population) lived in owner-occupied housing units and 652 people (11.9%) lived in rental housing units.

=== Demographic estimates ===
In 2023, the US Census Bureau estimated that 4.1% of the population were foreign-born. Of all people aged 5 or older, 93.5% spoke only English at home, 4.2% spoke Spanish, 0.0% spoke other Indo-European languages, 2.0% spoke Asian or Pacific Islander languages, and 0.4% spoke other languages. Of those aged 25 or older, 96.2% were high school graduates and 57.8% had a bachelor's degree.

=== Income and poverty ===
The median household income in 2023 was $129,767, and the per capita income was $69,973. About 5.0% of families and 4.5% of the population were below the poverty line.

The median household income was $102,284.

== Government ==
=== Local ===
Rancho Murieta is an unincorporated community within Sacramento County's 4th Supervisor District. As of 2025, the elected Sacramento County Supervisor is Rosario Rodriguez.

Rancho Murieta is located 23 miles southeast of the State Capitol in southeast Sacramento County. It is bisected by both the Cosumnes River and CA-16.

Rancho Murieta Community Services District was formed in 1982 by State Government Code 61000 to provide essential services in Rancho Murieta. Rancho Murieta CSD is an independent special district which provides the following services: water, sewer, drainage, flood control, security, solid waste collection and Parks and Recreation planning.

Rancho Murieta's governing bodies include a variety of homeowners associations: Rancho Murieta Association (RMA) provides Park and Recreation, street and common area maintenance and CC&R enforcement: Murieta Townhouses Inc. (MTI) maintains townhouses and provide insurance coverages for owners; The Villa Association (VA) streets and landscaping; Murieta Gardens Community Association (MGCA) and Rancho North Association (RNA) handles Design Review for the Retreats and 900 approved and prospective homes in the Rancho North Development. The Rancho Murieta Commercial Owners Association handles street commercial maintenance south of Highway 16. The Rancho Murieta Community Services District provides water, sewer, drainage, garbage, and security services for the community.

The RMA CC&R's limit motorcycle riding to within Rancho Murieta South.

=== State and Federal ===
In the state legislature Rancho Murieta is located in the 6th Senate District, represented by Republican Roger Niello, and in the 9th Assembly District, represented by Republican Heath Flora.

Federally, Rancho Murieta is in California's 7th congressional district, represented by Democrat Doris Matsui.

The Rancho Murieta Airport is a designated reliever airport for general aviation in Sacramento County. The runway is 3800' long with a parallel taxiway and VASI approach with lighting system. It is no longer home to the FAA Flight Service Station.

Rancho Murieta is home to the Joint Apprentice Training Center (JATC) for Operating Engineers International Union (Local #3).

== Telephone prefixes ==
Telephone numbers for wired telephones working out of the Rancho Murieta central office follow the format (916) or (279) 354-xxxx and 314-xxxx.
