= Jenkinson Lake =

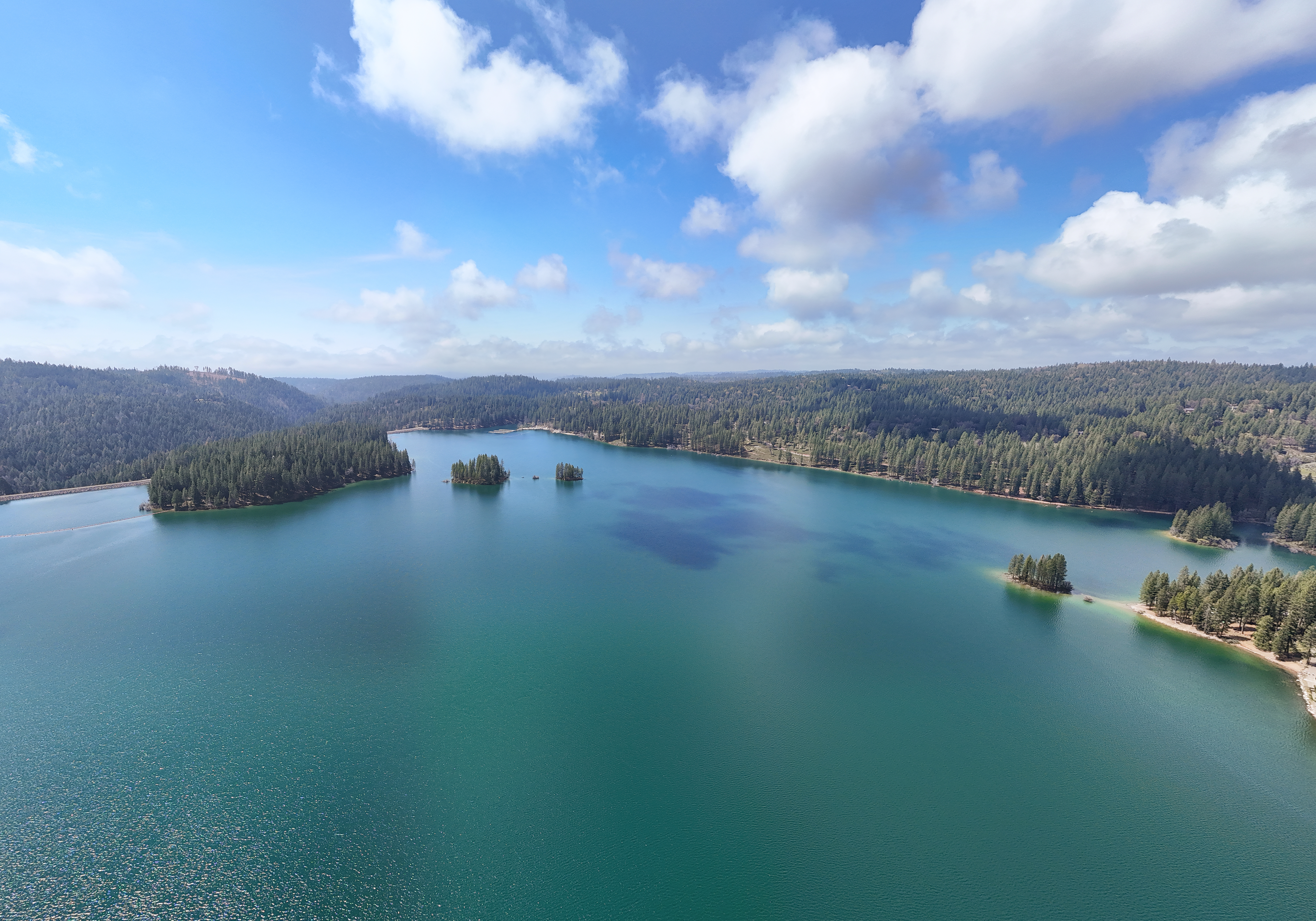
- Aerial view

- Location within California Location within the United States
- Location: Sly Park, California
- Coordinates: 38°43′14.16″N 120°33′13.68″W
- Type: Reservoir
- Primary inflows: Camp Creek
- Primary outflows: Sly Park Creek
- Catchment area: 47 sq mi (120 km^{2})
- Basin countries: United States
- First flooded: 1952
- Max. length: 2.5 mi (4.0 km)
- Max. width: 2.21 mi (3.56 km)
- Surface area: 650 acres (260 ha)
- Water volume: 41,000 acre⋅ft (51 hm^{3})
- Shore length^{1}: ca. 8 mi (13 km)
- Surface elevation: 3,400 ft (1,000 m)
- Islands: 4
- Settlements: Sly Park, Pollock Pines
- ^{1} Shore length is not a well-defined measure.

Jenkinson Lake is a reservoir located in El Dorado County, California near Pollock Pines, California named after Walter E. Jenkinson, manager of the El Dorado irrigation district.

There are two main parts, the upper and lower lake. The lower lake is about eight times larger than the upper lake, which is to the northeast of its partner. The lower lake is more of a rounded body, while the upper is more narrow.

In the upper eastern area of the upper lake lies a large inlet, which can be traced to a waterfall.

The Sly Park Dam can be found to the southern part of the lake, and an auxiliary dam can be found to the southeast.

== Lake activities ==
Common activities include boating, camping, fishing, horseback riding, and hiking / biking.

The California Office of Environmental Health Hazard Assessment (OEHHA) has developed an advisory for Jenkinson Lake because of mercury found in fish caught from this water body. The advisory provides safe eating advice for Rainbow Trout, sunfish species, and black bass species.

== 2021 Caldor Fire ==
In early August 2021 The Caldor Fire was sweeping through Grizzly Flat and heading right for Jenkinson Lake, the area's main water source.

Once the smoke had cleared, local authorities concluded that the fire's intense heat and proximity to the lake had impacted the water quality of Lake Jenkinson.

The pine trees and bushes that once surrounded portions of the lake were destroyed in the fire, scorching the soil and releasing carbon. Carbon continues to be released as trees decay and the once-fertile soil turns pale and dusty. The forested area had been naturally storing carbon up for decades and the release of carbon from the wildfire was investigated for months following the blaze.
