= Outingdale, California =

Unincorporated community in California, United States

Outingdale
- Unincorporated community
- Location in California Outingdale (the United States)
- Coordinates: 38°37′00″N 120°43′48″W
- Country: United States
- State: California
- County: El Dorado
- Elevation: 1,624 ft (495 m)

Outingdale (formerly, Mars and Outingdale Resort) is an unincorporated community in El Dorado County, California, United States. It is located on the Middle Fork of the Cosumnes River, 4 miles (6.4 km) north of Aukum, at an elevation of 1624 feet (495 m).

Outingdale was founded in 1928 as a resort community, originally consisting of 680 acres of land, more than half of it shared recreational space. Outingdale today is home to approximately 150 residents. It gets its water from the Cosumnes River, and is therefore heavily dependent on winter snowpack for water, which is scarce in drought years. During the severe 2021 drought, water had to be delivered to Outingdale by truck.
