= Rancho Cosumnes =

Mexican land grant in California

Coordinates: 38.430°N 121.190°W

Rancho Cosumnes (also called "Rancho de Hartnell") was a 26,605-acre (107.67 km^{2}) Mexican land grant in present-day Sacramento County, California given in 1844 by Governor Manuel Micheltorena to William Edward Petty Hartnell. The grant extended along the south bank of the Cosumnes River, across from Rancho Omochumnes.

== History ==
William Edward (Guillermo Eduardo) Petty Hartnell (1798–1854) received the five square league Rancho Todos Santos y San Antonio in Santa Barbara County from Governor Juan B. Alvarado in 1841 and sold his Rancho El Alisal to Alvarado. In 1844, Hartnell was granted the eleven square league Rancho Cosumnes from Micheltorena.

With the cession of California to the United States following the Mexican-American War, the 1848 Treaty of Guadalupe Hidalgo provided that the land grants would be honored. As required by the Land Act of 1851, a claim for Rancho Cosumnes was filed with the Public Land Commission in 1852. Hartnell claimed eleven square leagues for Rancho Cosumnes, but because he had another claim for the five square league Rancho Todos Santos y San Antonio, the Land Commission Rancho Cosumnes was reduced to six square leagues - so that the total would not have exceeded the eleven square league maximum under Mexican law. The U.S. Supreme Court affirmed the decree, and the grant was patented to William Edward Petty Hartnell in 1869. A second claim was filed by William Hicks and James Martin in 1853 but was rejected.

When Hartnell died in 1854, his widow, Maria Teresa de la Guerra de Hartnell and the 11 children inherited the rancho. Hartnell wrote in his will - "My principal object is to prevent any member of the law from having anything whatsover to do with my property or with my executors or heirs." Maria Teresa de la Guerra's brother, Pablo de la Guerra was administrator of the estate.

The former Rancho Cosumnes lands are east across the Cosumnes River from the town Elk Grove.

== See also ==
- List of California Ranchos
- Ranchos of Sacramento County, California
