= Sly Park Dam =

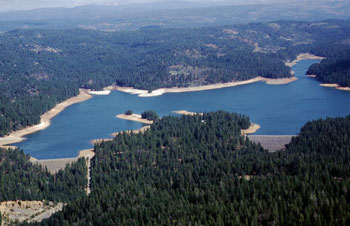
- Sly Park Dam (right) and auxiliary dam
- Interactive map of Sly Park Dam
- Location: El Dorado County, California
- Coordinates: 38.71518°N 120.5627°W
- Construction began: 1953; 73 years ago
- Opening date: 1955; 71 years ago
- Operator: U.S. Bureau of Reclamation

Dam and spillways
- Impounds: Sly Park Creek
- Height: 190 feet (58 m)
- Length: 760 feet (230 m)
- Spillway type: Gated overflow
- Spillway capacity: 6,700 cubic feet per second (190 m^{3}/s)

Reservoir
- Creates: Jenkinson Lake
- Total capacity: 41,000 acre-feet (51,000 dam^{3})
- Catchment area: 47 square miles (120 km^{2})
- Surface area: 650 acres (260 ha)

Power Station
- Hydraulic head: 170 feet (52 m)
- Installed capacity: None

Sly Park Dam is located near Pollock Pines, California in the United States. The dam impounds Sly Park Creek and Hazel Creek, natural tributaries of the North Fork Cosumnes River, to form a 41,000 acre-foot (51,000 dam^{3}), 650-acre (260 ha) reservoir called Jenkinson Lake. It was constructed as part of the American River Division of the Central Valley Project to provide irrigation water to a portion of El Dorado County, California. The dam was begun in May 1953, with clearing operations, and was completed in mid 1955.

The earthfill Sly Park Dam is 190 feet (58 m) high, with a hydraulic height of 170 feet (52 m), and 760 feet (230 m) long. Its auxiliary dam is 130 feet (40 m) high and 600 feet (180 m) long. The spillway of Sly Park Dam is actually in the auxiliary dam: it is a concrete chute 170 feet (52 m) long and can carry 6,700 cubic feet (190 m^{3}) per second, while the outlet works at the foot of the dam can carry 47 cubic feet (1.3 m^{3}) per second. The drainage area of Sly Park Creek behind the dam is 47 square miles (120 km^{2}). The Camino Conduit diverts water roughly 7.2 miles (11.6 km) west from the Jenkinson Reservoir for irrigation purposes. Water is also diverted from Camp Creek into Jenkinson Lake to increase the total water yield.

== Jenkinson Lake watershed ==
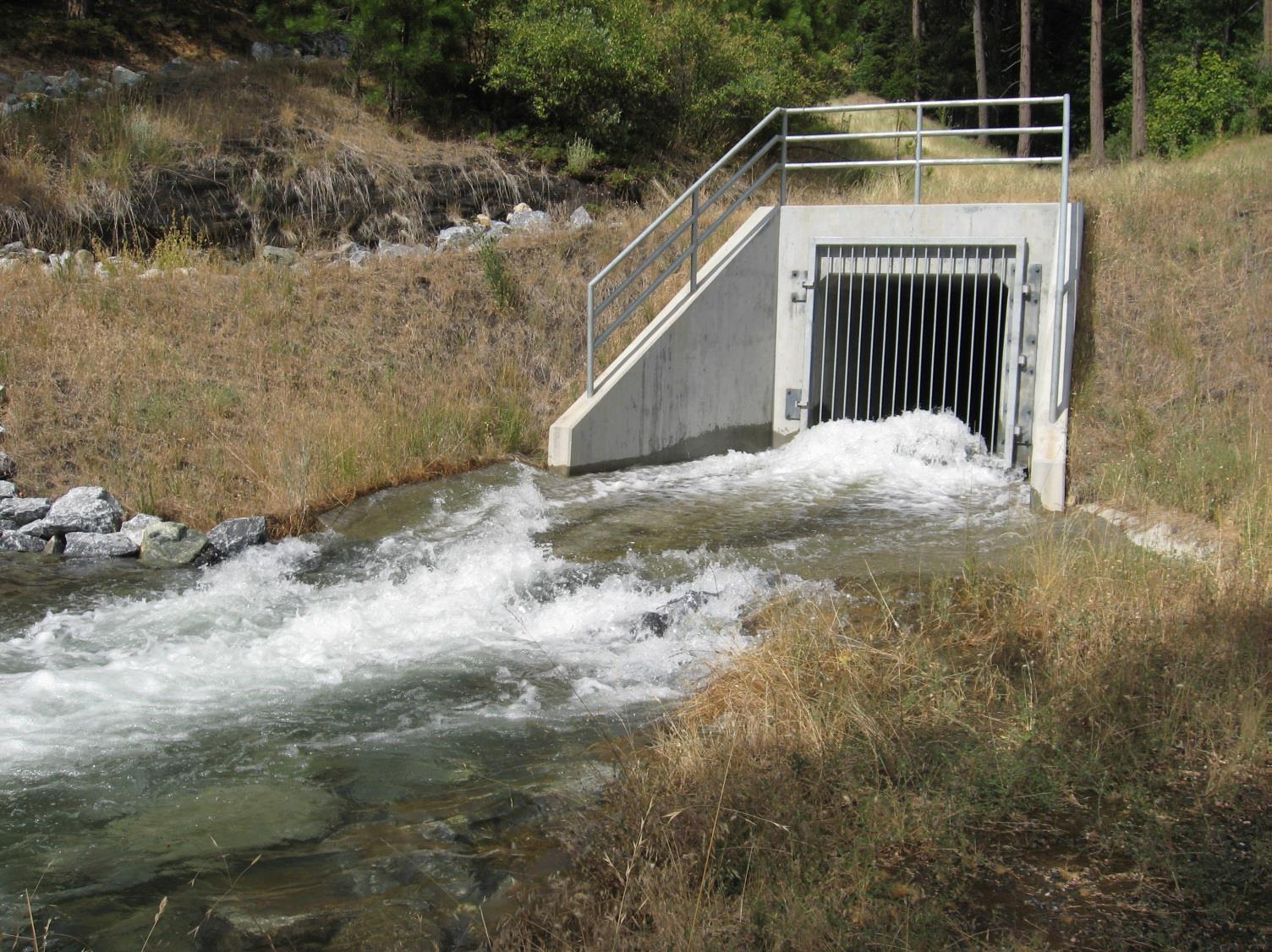
Hazel creek tunnel diverts water into Jenkinson Lake.

The Jenkinson Lake watershed consists of the approximately 16.5 square mile area between Sly Park Dam and the Cold Canyon Tributary of Sly Park Creek. This area includes both forks of Sly Park Creek, Hazel Creek, and the Cold Canyon Tributary of Sly Park Creek. Jenkinson Lake receives insufficient inflow from this area and additional water is diverted from outside the watershed through the Camp Creek Diversion Tunnel to meet demand. The area played a significant role in the gold rush era of California's history.

=== Climate ===
Like most of California, the Jenkinson Lake watershed has a Mediterranean climate, with hot dry summers and cool wet winters. Located on the windward side of the Sierra Nevada, the watershed receives a large amount of precipitation relative to other reservoirs in the Central Valley, such as Folsom Lake. The area receives an annual average precipitation of 51.6 inches. Precipitation typically occurs October through May as rain and snow, though the reservoir's watershed is low enough in elevation that continued runoff from snow pack is not significant. The reservoir is necessary to store water for use during the dry summer months.

=== Environment ===
Elevation in the watershed ranges from 3400 to 5600 feet. The area is mountainous and consists of steep slopes and rocky outcrops. Soils in the area are deep with high water holding capacity. There is a high potential for landslides and the subsequent siltation of streams. The major mineral deposit in the area is gold. This was an important factor in the development of the area. Gold and other mineral deposits in the area may also be rich in iron and sulfides, which may impact water quality.

Vegetation in the area consists of oak woodland and mixed conifer forest. Common softwood tree species include ponderosa pine and douglas fir. Hardwood tree species include blue oak and black oak. Manzanita, western mountain mahogany, and poison oak are common understory plants, in addition to annual grasses. Vegetation plays an important role in stabilizing slopes in the area. Removal of vegetation by logging, development, and fire may increase erosion and the risk of landslides. Vegetation also provides important habitat for wildlife.

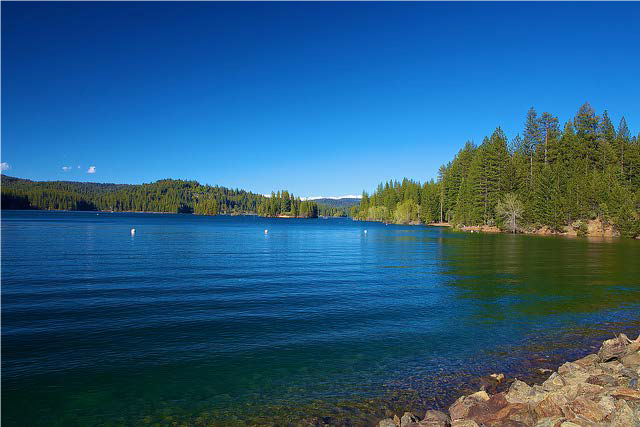
Shoreline at Jenkinson Lake

The Jenkinson Lake watershed supports a wide variety of animal species. Mammals include California mule deer, American black bear, and mountain lion. Common birds include the mountain chickadee and stellar's jay. Raptors include golden eagle, red-tailed hawk, and great horned owls. Reptiles include rattlesnake, gopher snake, and rubber boa. Wildlife makes the area an attractive recreation destination. Some mammals may also carry giardia, which may impact water quality.

=== Land use ===
Historical land use in the area included mining, ranching and timber harvesting and milling. Following the discovery of gold in California, miners quickly populated the area. The development of agriculture and commerce followed the miners. Large amounts of water were required for hydraulic mining, and the miners built many water conveyance structures, some of which are still used today. The gold rush was the first significant human impact on the watershed.

Before Sly Park Dam was built, the area where the reservoir now exists was known as Sly Park Ranch. Grazing and agriculture took place at Sly Park Ranch. There was also a timber mill, Sly Park Mill, located near the second dam on Sly Park Creek.

Current land use in the watershed is predominately Forest/Recreational use. Most of the land is publicly owned. The major land owners are El Dorado Irrigation District, the US Bureau of Reclamation, and the USDA Forest Service. Private landowners include the timber companies Sierra Pacific Industries and Georgia Pacific, which have had a large influence on timber management in the region. Smaller logging operations are authorized on the Forest Service lands as well as recreational uses. Recreational use includes off highway vehicle trails, mountain biking, hunting, and horseback riding among other activities.

== Water use ==
Water from Jenkinson Lake is used for municipal water supply, irrigation, and recreation. Historically, irrigation water for agriculture was the greatest water user. As the area develops and the population grows, municipal and commercial water users become more important. Municipal users are now the primary water users of water from Jenkinson Lake, though agriculture is still a significant user. Future population growth, climate change, and water reuse technology and conservation will influence water use in the future.

=== Municipal users ===
Municipal water is the fastest growing water use within EID's service area. Water from Jenkinson Lake is treated at the Sly Park Water Treatment Plant (SPWTP) West of the Reservoir. The water is then distributed throughout EID's service area. Jenkinson Lake is not the only source of municipal water for the system; it draws water from several sources including the South American River and Folsom Lake. However, the contribution of water from Jenkinson Lake to the overall water system is substantial. Jenkinson Lake is the largest reservoir dedicated to water supply that is operated by EID. Many areas in the district's service area are isolated, either by topography or limited water distribution infrastructure, and rely on water from Jenkinson Lake. Pumping municipal water from Bureau of Reclamation operated Folsom Lake is too costly for some areas in the district.

=== Agricultural users ===
Agriculture remains a significant water user despite the rapid urban development in the area. El Dorado County contains many orchards, vineyards, and pastures that demand large quantities of irrigation water seasonally. Apple Hill Growers Association farms and ranches are located in nearby Camino. Apple hill includes orchards, Christmas tree farms, pumpkin patches and other agriculture related tourist destinations. While traditional livestock grazing in the area has declined since it was first settled, agricultural water use will likely continue to grow.

=== Recreational users ===
Recreation on the lake is administered by EID. Recreation on the lake includes boating, hiking, horseback riding, and camping. Recreational use has increased over the last several years. Though recreational users consume a negligible amount of water from Jenkinson Lake, recreational activities have the potential to impact water quality. Pollution from boats, pit toilets, erosion caused by off highway vehicles may pollute the water sources.

Because of the lake's recreation potential, population in the area is seasonal. There are many vacation homes in the immediate area of the reservoir. The seasonal population places greater demands on the water system during the summer months, during which recreational opportunities are numerous.

=== Future water use ===
In general, the demand for water is increasing as supplies become less reliable. Increased urbanization and suburban development in EID's service area places greater demand on water supplies and creates more wastewater and stormwater that must be dealt with. Agriculture, while grazing has become less common, other potentially water intensive crops have become more popular, such as fruit trees and grapes in orchards and vineyards. Agriculture, in addition to the area's naturally scenic qualities, has also increased tourism and recreational use. The population in the area is seasonal and places greater demand on the water system during the time of the year when supplies are most scarce: summer and fall. Climate change has the potential to reduce the water available for storage, and the area has few other water resources, with many areas remote enough to be isolated from the piping required to supply water from the rest of the Central Valley Project.

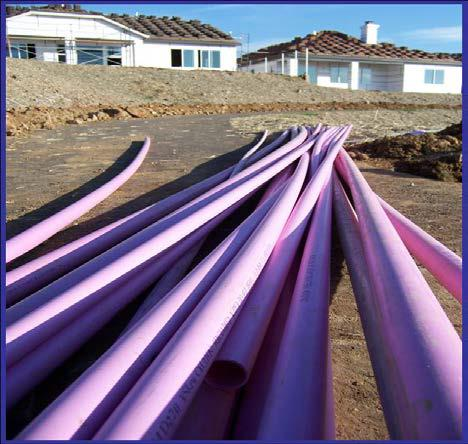
Purple pipe used for reclaim water in new homes.

EID is addressing future water use in several ways. Municipal conservation is important in reducing demand. Encouraging water saving appliances, faucets, toilets, and shower heads will reduce municipal use without requiring the public to ration their water. Leak detection and piping improvements are also being used to reduce the water lost in the distribution system. The most important water conservation measure may be the reuse of wastewater, also called reclaimed water, for urban landscaping and golf courses. As the area develops, more wastewater is produced. By reusing the water for irrigation municipal water use is greatly reduced, as nearly half of most residential water use goes to landscaping.

== See also ==
- List of lakes in California
