= Wilton, California =

Wilton
- census-designated place
- Location in Sacramento County and the state of California
- Coordinates: 38°24′34″N 121°13′27″W
- Country: United States
- State: California
- County: Sacramento

Area
  - Total: 29.002 sq mi (75.11 km^{2})
  - Land: 29.002 sq mi (75.11 km^{2})
  - Water: 0 sq mi (0 km^{2}) 0%
- Elevation: 79 ft (24 m)

Population (2020)
  - Total: 5,958
  - Density: 205.4/sq mi (79.32/km^{2})
- Time zone: UTC-8 (PST)
  - Summer (DST): UTC-7 (PDT)
- ZIP code: 95693
- Area codes: 916, 279
- FIPS code: 06-85880
- GNIS feature ID: 1652655

Wilton is a census-designated place (CDP) in Sacramento County, California, United States. It is part of the Sacramento–Arden-Arcade–Roseville Metropolitan Statistical Area. The population was 5,958 at the 2020 census, up from 5,363 at the 2010 census.

== Geography and environment ==
According to the United States Census Bureau, the CDP has a total area of 29.0 square miles (75 km^{2}), all land.

Historically the Wilton vicinity has been a locale of considerable haying and pasture usage; the depth to groundwater is typically about 150 to 175 feet (46 to 53 meters).

Wilton lies partially in the floodplain of the Cosumnes River. Because some areas of Wilton are in a flood zone, water can be in the streets during the rainy season. In 1997, an El Nino/La Nina year, levees broke and some homes were flooded to the rooftops. On New Year's Eve of 2022, parts of Wilton were evacuated due to a flood warning after levee breaches on the Cosumnes River.

== Demographics ==
Historical population
Census	Pop.	Note	%±
1990	3,858		—
2000	4,551		18.0%
2010	5,363		17.8%
2020	5,958		11.1%
U.S. Decennial Census; 1850–1870 1880-1890; 1900 1910 1920; 1930 1940 1950; 1960 1970 1980; 1990 2000 2010

Wilton first appeared as a census designated place in the 1990 U.S. census.

=== 2020 census ===
As of the 2020 census, Wilton had a population of 5,958 and a population density of 205.4 inhabitants per square mile (79.3/km^{2}). The median age was 46.7 years. 21.2% of residents were under the age of 18, 7.9% were aged 18 to 24, 18.8% were aged 25 to 44, 29.7% were aged 45 to 64, and 22.4% were 65 years of age or older. For every 100 females, there were 100.8 males, and for every 100 females age 18 and over, there were 100.9 males age 18 and over.

The census reported that 99.4% of the population lived in households, 0.6% lived in non-institutionalized group quarters, and no one was institutionalized. There were 2,039 households in Wilton, of which 30.8% had children under the age of 18 living in them. Of all households, 66.6% were married-couple households, 4.0% were cohabiting couple households, 13.8% were households with a male householder and no spouse or partner present, and 15.6% were households with a female householder and no spouse or partner present. About 16.2% of all households were made up of individuals, and 8.1% had someone living alone who was 65 years of age or older. The average household size was 2.91. There were 1,619 families (79.4% of all households).

There were 2,196 housing units, of which 92.9% were occupied and 7.1% were vacant. Of occupied units, 88.2% were owner-occupied and 11.8% were occupied by renters. The homeowner vacancy rate was 0.4%, and the rental vacancy rate was 3.6%.

0.0% of residents lived in urban areas, while 100.0% lived in rural areas.

Racial composition as of the 2020 census
Race	Number	Percent
White	4,107	68.9%
Black or African American	120	2.0%
American Indian and Alaska Native	94	1.6%
Asian	312	5.2%
Native Hawaiian and Other Pacific Islander	27	0.5%
Some other race	414	6.9%
Two or more races	884	14.8%
Hispanic or Latino (of any race)	1,171	19.7%

=== Income and poverty ===
In 2023, the US Census Bureau estimated that the median household income was $171,579, and the per capita income was $55,949. About 2.1% of families and 5.4% of the population were below the poverty line.

=== 2010 census ===
The 2010 United States census reported that Wilton had a population of 5,363. The population density was 184.9 inhabitants per square mile (71.4/km^{2}). The racial makeup of Wilton was 2,234 (78.9%) White, 169 (3.2%) African American, 45 (0.8%) Native American, 289 (5.4%) Asian, 13 (0.2%) Pacific Islander, 343 (6.4%) from other races, and 270 (5.0%) from two or more races. Hispanic or Latino of any race were 683 persons (12.7%).

The Census reported that 3,341 people (99.6% of the population) lived in households, 16 (0.3%) lived in non-institutionalized group quarters, and 6 (0.1%) were institutionalized.

There were 1,865 households, out of which 613 (32.9%) had children under the age of 18 living in them, 1,281 (68.7%) were opposite-sex married couples living together, 130 (7.0%) had a female householder with no husband present, 84 (4.5%) had a male householder with no wife present. There were 66 (3.5%) unmarried opposite-sex partnerships, and 17 (0.9%) same-sex married couples or partnerships. 284 households (15.2%) were made up of individuals, and 124 (6.6%) had someone living alone who was 65 years of age or older. The average household size was 2.86. There were 1,495 families (80.2% of all households); the average family size was 3.18.

The population was spread out, with 1,240 people (23.1%) under the age of 18, 416 people (7.8%) aged 18 to 24, 975 people (18.2%) aged 25 to 44, 1,879 people (35.0%) aged 45 to 64, and 853 people (15.9%) who were 65 years of age or older. The median age was 45.5 years. For every 100 females, there were 98.9 males. For every 100 females age 18 and over, there were 98.2 males.

There were 2,090 housing units at an average density of 72.1 per square mile (27.8/km^{2}), of which 1,620 (86.9%) were owner-occupied, and 245 (13.1%) were occupied by renters. The homeowner vacancy rate was 2.2%; the rental vacancy rate was 5.0%. 4,646 people (86.6% of the population) lived in owner-occupied housing units and 695 people (13.0%) lived in rental housing units.

== Politics ==
In the state legislature Wilton is in the 6th senatorial district, represented by Republican Roger Niello, and in the 9th Assembly district, represented by Republican Heath Flora.

Federally, Wilton is in California's 7th congressional district, represented by Democrat Doris Matsui.
