= Cosumnes River Preserve =

Nature preserve in California, U.S.

- IUCN category V (protected landscape/seascape)
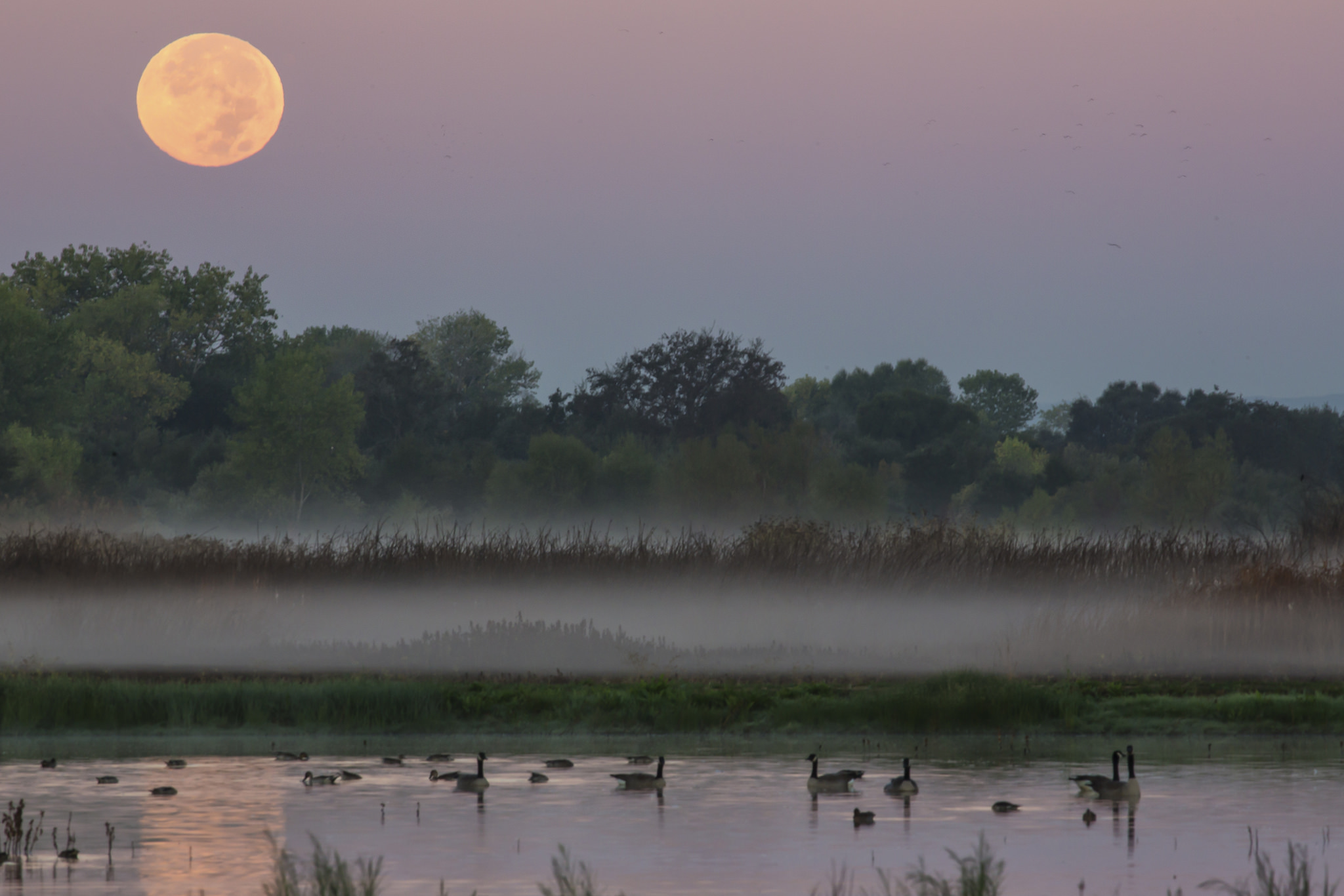
- Interactive map of Cosumnes River Preserve
- Location: Sacramento County, California
- Nearest city: Sacramento, California
- Coordinates: 38°15′56″N 121°26′21″W
- Area: 46,000 acres (190 km^{2})
- Established: 1987
- Governing body: Joint management: The Nature Conservancy, Bureau of Land Management, Ducks Unlimited, Department of Fish and Wildlife, Department of Water Resources, Sacramento County Department of Parks and Recreation, and the state Wildlife Conservation Board.

U.S. National Natural Landmark
- Designated: 1976

The Cosumnes River Preserve is a nature preserve of over 51,000 acres (210 km^{2}) located 20 miles (30 km) south of Sacramento, in the US state of California. The preserve protects a Central Valley remnant that once contained one of the largest expanses of oak tree savanna, riparian oak forest and wetland habitat in North America. Agricultural development has changed the landscape from groves of oaks and tule marshes to productive farmlands.

The Cosumnes River is the last remaining free-flowing river in California's Central Valley, with the preserve located on the river's lower reach where it joins the Sacramento-San Joaquin Delta tidelands. The area supports a diverse range of plant and animal life, including three species of oak as well as rare plants like the endemic northern California black walnut (Juglans hindsii). Notable features include the sandhill crane fall migration and the Tall Forest in Wood Duck Slough. More than 250 bird species, more than 40 fish species, and some 230 plant species have been identified here.

Located on the bird migration route, the Pacific Flyway, the preserve is designated an Important Bird Area by the American Bird Conservancy and National Audubon Society. Several rare birds, such as the Tri-colored Blackbird and the Greater Sandhill Crane, have been identified. Many bird species that have been extirpated from most of the Central Valley are returning to the area.

The preserve is between two growing urban centers, Sacramento in the north, and Stockton to the south, which threaten to constrict the protected areas to a narrow corridor extending from the Sierra foothills to the Sacramento River Delta.

In total, there are over 51,000 acres that are owned by the preserve partners with almost 40,000 acres of that being used for agricultural production. Of those 46,000 acres, approximately 12,500 acres are easement lands and 16,500 acres are fee-owned lands. Currently the Cosumnes River Preserve uses both public and private lands as a location for migratory birds throughout the year as well preserving natural riparian oak woodlands, vernal pools, wetlands, and grasslands.^{[6]} The Elderberry longhorn beetle, California giant garter snake, and the Swainson's hawk are three threatened or endangered species that have been found living on the preserve.

== History ==
The Miwok Native American tribe settled the area around the Cosumnes River Preserve many centuries ago. They survived up through the 1900s with a 1910 census counting 670 Miwok Native Americans left. According to a 1770 estimate, there were approximately 9000 Miwok present.^{[7]} Population density for the Miwok tribe was about 10 persons per square mile which may have been the most out of any California tribe.^{[8]} The entire Miwok tribe consisted of 28 small groups which could range from 300 to 475 people. The Miwok people ate a diet consisting of acorns, various types of other seeds, deer, and fish. The local Miwok people practiced burning and other management practices to shape the land to create more opportunity for food. Through these methods of enhancing floodplains in the area, fish species may have had lower mortality rates and increased growth.^{[9]} After the mid-1700s, the Miwok way of life started to change with the arrival of the Spanish.

Around 1770, a small group consisting of Spanish explorers decided that the Cosumnes River Preserve and other places within the Central Valley was a perfect pasture for grazing animals. Trappers came into the area around the preserve in the early 1800s but found that there was no place to settle and the fur trapping was not worth it. The Mexican government started issuing land grants in 1844 and John Sutter who was a European immigrant was one of the first to colonize the Cosumnes River area. John Sutter founded the colony New Helvetia and soon some of his assistants moved out to the Cosumnes River Preserve area. Once the California gold rush started in 1848, many miners settled in along the Cosumnes River hoping to find gold and get rich. Once realizing that there was not much gold in the region, they dammed the river and changed the landscape to grow hay, wheat, and various types of fruit. The Miwok people lost sources of food that they relied on and soon after villages and burial grounds were destroyed. Shortly after, the Miwok moved out of the region where the Cosumnes River Preserve is and in 1999, the last person to speak Plains Miwuk died.

The fast-disappearing valley oak (Quercus lobata) tree of California's Central Valley prompted The Nature Conservancy, a nonprofit conservation organization, to find and protect these trees from the rapid urban growth in the 1980s. After surveying the entire valley, the best stands were found on the lower Cosumnes River and a preserve of 800 acres (3.2 km^{2}) was established in 1987. With further study, scientists better understood the river-oak forest relationship; the "swamp oak" is another name for the valley oak because it thrives on deep, alluvial soils (which also makes good farmland) that the river deposits with seasonal flooding. The Conservancy realized that it needed a larger, broader view that included the river, floodplains, the whole watershed. As a result, in 1993, the conservancy moved beyond its hallmark of outright land purchases and into cooperative agreements with farmers, water-and flood control agencies, and shared in management responsibility with federal, state and local land agencies toward the goal of protecting a watershed of 1,200 square miles (3,100 km^{2}) in size.

Some partners in the cooperative agreement include: US Bureau of Land Management, California Department of Water Resources, California State Lands Commission, Sacramento County's Department of Regional Parks, California Department of Fish and Wildlife, Wildlife Conservation Board, Ducks Unlimited, Inc., and private landowners.
In 1998, the Howard Ranch, located within the watershed area, was put up for sale. The ranch contains important wetlands, including vernal pools, and the conservancy purchased the property of 13,000 acres (53 km^{2}) property using a combination of grants and loans. The loans included funds from the federal Clean Water Act's State Revolving Fund. This was the first time these funds had been used to purchase and protect wetlands.

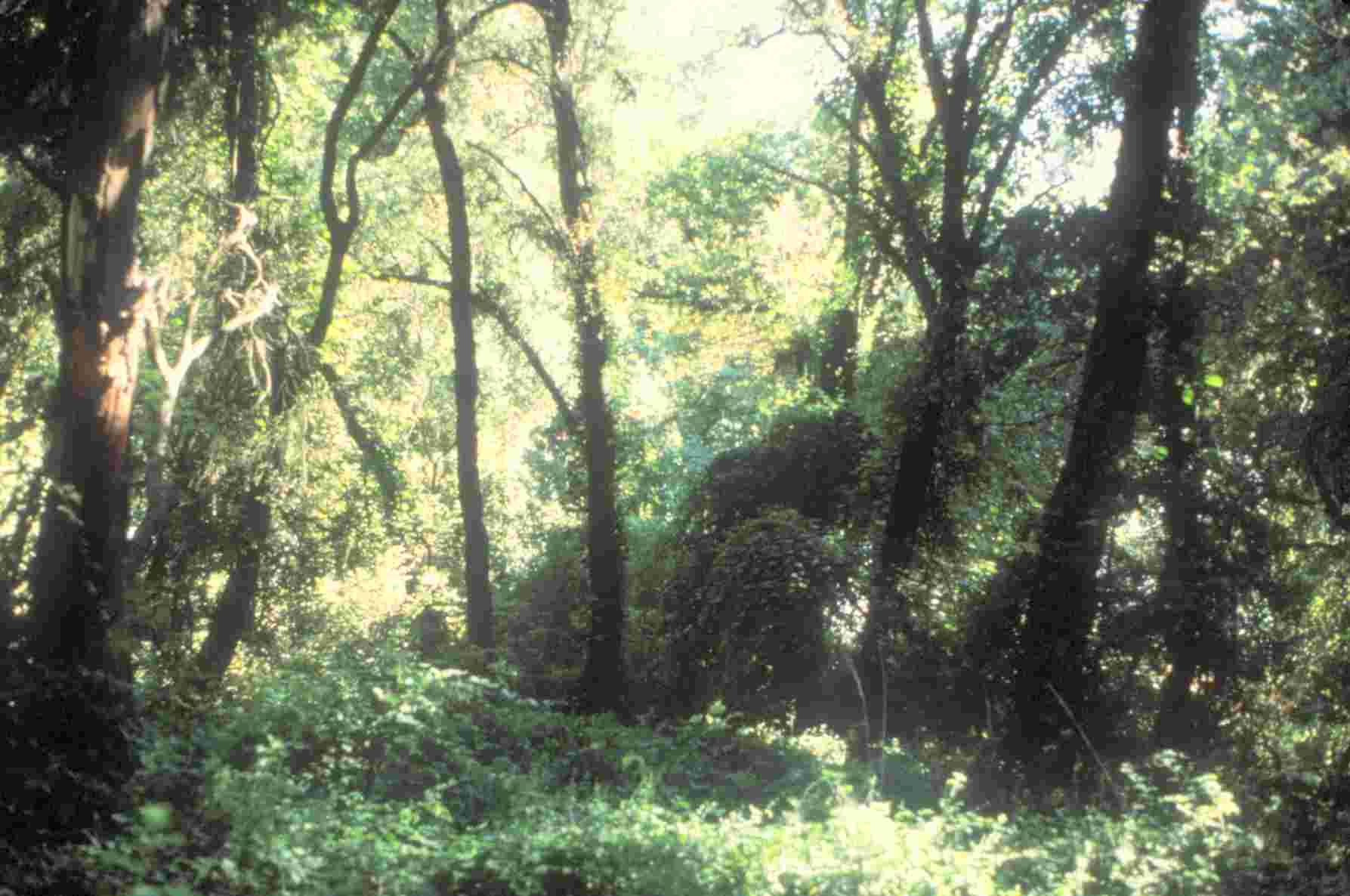
Cosumnes River riparian woodland

Currently, the preserve is more than 46,000 acres (190 km^{2}) with educational and scientific studies being conducted in one of the largest conservation efforts begun on a watershed-sized scale. Collectively known as the Cosumnes River Project, it is a broad-based work to restore and protect the integrity of the river and associated landscapes including Central Valley habitats and wildlife.

== River and forest relationship ==
The Cosumnes River has no major dams on its course of 80 miles (130 km) and floods after heavy rains bringing in sediments that provide nutrients for the vegetation, as well as recharging groundwater levels. In addition, removal of the man-made levees allows more inundation of floodwaters and is what ecologist Rich Reiner terms "natural process restoration".

Notable trees in the preserve include valley oak and blue oak. The valley oak was once common in central California, forming large groves along rivers and streams. In grasslands, they form open savannas along with blue oaks. The valley oak is the largest of the native California oak trees and can live to be 600 years old. With a vertical root system as deep as 80 feet, it can reach groundwater levels. The blue oak tolerates dry soil and can have a root system 30 feet deep. It has a distinctive blue tint in the green leaf color that can best be seen when compared to another nearby oak of a different type. The blue oak can live to be 400 years old and provides critical winter range for deer and other wildlife. The oaks provide several hundred pounds of nuts yearly, and at least 35 mammals and around 100 birds include oak acorns in their diet. Especially mule deer and western gray squirrel, who rely so much on the acorn crop that a poorly producing year can limit their populations.

Threats to the trees include land-clearing, rodents and exotic grasses. The non-native grasses are more aggressive and produce more seed than the native perennials, which attracts seed-eaters like Botta's Pocket Gopher that also feed on acorns and oak seedlings. Restoration includes breaching the levees, allowing floodwaters to scour out the non-native grasses, reduce rodent populations and deposit sediment. With the buildup of sand and sediments in the flooded areas, studies have shown an increase growth of cottonwoods and willows, which in turn trap more sediments during the next flood cycles.

The vegetation of oak, willow, alder, elderberry, cattails, and many other plants provide food, shelter and nesting sites for a wide range of wildlife, including migrating birds on the Pacific Flyway. The river is part of a dynamic balance of natural processes that sustain the plant and animal life that depend upon it.

"Every time a levee is repaired, the river is prevented from establishing a healthy floodplain, and every time river water is stored in a reservoir, the flow pulses essential for ecologic processes are eliminated."
-Philip B. Williams, Ph.D., Reno, NV. August, 2001 (from his speech River Engineering Versus River Restoration given at an ASCE conference)

== Hydrology ==
The Cosumnes River Preserve is a wetland habitat that experiences annual flooding. This area is a perennial stream that experiences late summer runoff that used to provide up welling groundwater to the preserve. With increased agricultural production however, much of the groundwater underneath the Cosumnes River Preserve has been depleted so it cannot recharge the wetland habitat during the early summer.^{[10]} During the wet season, which occurs between late fall and early spring, much of the Cosumnes Preserve floods which provides a perfect wetland habitat for many riparian species of flora and fauna. During the late summer and early fall, the Cosumnes River Preserve has no water flow which could potentially impact local aquatic plant species as well as fish.

== Flora and fauna ==
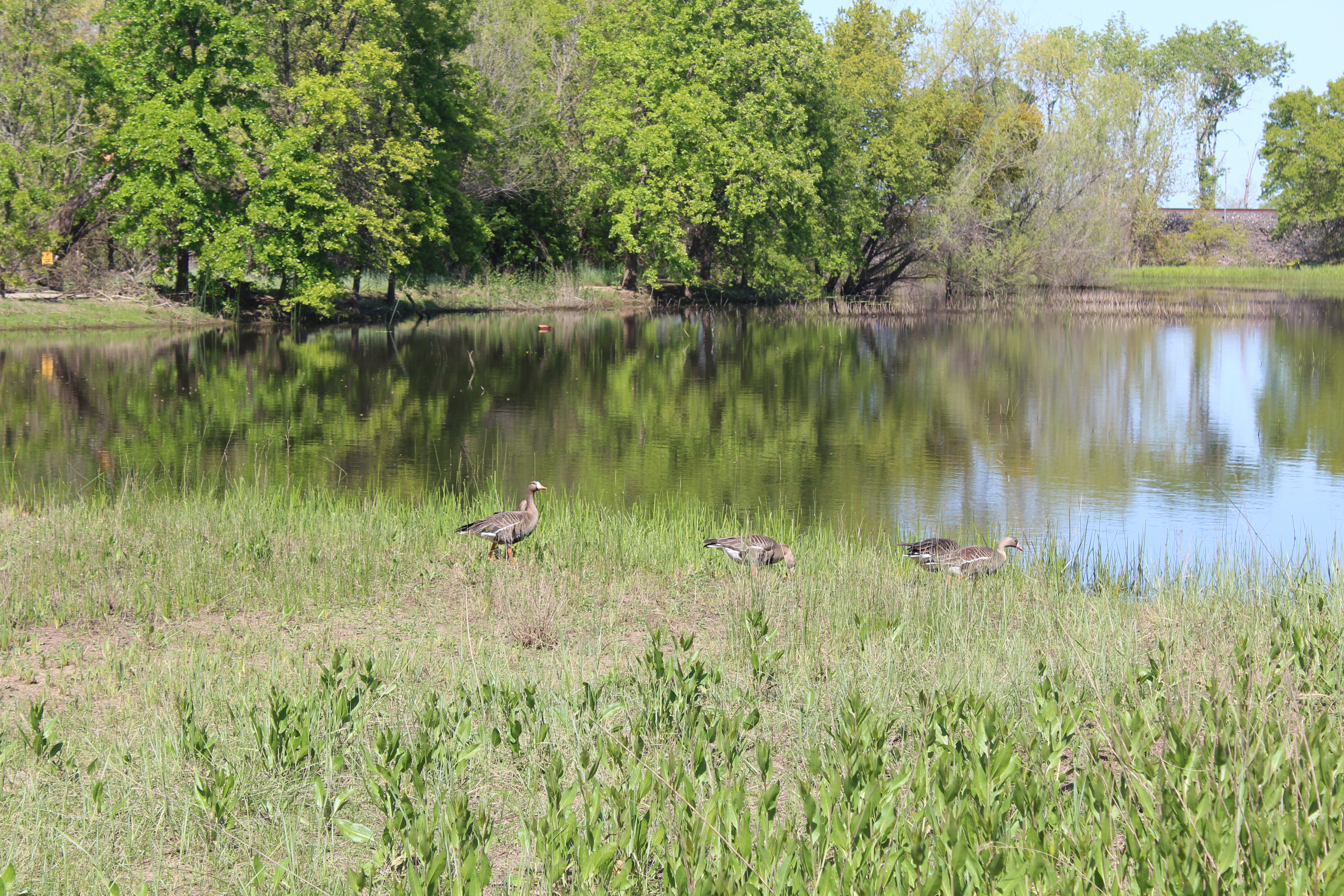
Greater white-fronted goose (Anser albifrons)

There are many species of plants that reside within the preserve besides the iconic Valley Oak (Quercus lobata). Some of the species that are located close to the water are Cottonwood (Populus fremontii), cattail (Typhaceae typha), Broadleaf Arrowhead (Sagittaria latifolia), and Pampas Grass (Cortaderia selloana). Other plants in the preserve include Wild California Grape (Vitis californica), California Rose (Rosa californica), and the Elderberry tree (Adoxaceae Sambucus). Two greatly invasive plant species that occur around the Cosumnes River Preserve are the Perennial Pepperweed (Lepidium latifolium) and Common water hyacinth (Eichhornia crassipes).

The Cosumnes River Preserve is also a habitat for many mammals, birds, fish, reptiles, and amphibians. Some of the larger mammals that live on the preserve include beavers (Castor canadensis), otters (Lontra canadensis), mountain lions (Puma concolor), and black-tailed deer (Odocoileus hemionus). Many smaller mammal species also exist within the preserve such as muskrats (Ondatra zibethicus), black-tailed jackrabbits (Lepus californicus), and raccoons (Procyon lotor). Many people traveling to the preserve will witness local bird species such as the red-tailed hawks(Buteo jamaicensis), swainson's hawks (Buteo swainsoni), Nuttall's woodpeckers (Picoides nuttallii). Many migratory bird species including the greater and lesser sandhill cranes (Grus canadensis), tundra swan (Cygnus columbianus), and various species of ducks also call the preserve home. Two of the native fish species that have been recorded within the preserve are Chinook salmon (Oncorhynchus tshawytscha) and Tule perch (Hysterocarpus traskii). A few amphibians and reptiles that have been spotted on the preserve include the California Tiger Salamander (Ambystoma californiense), the Giant Garter Snake (Thamnophis gigas), the Western Fence Lizard (Sceloporus occidentalis), and the Western Pond Turtle (Actinemys marmorata).^{[11]}

== Public access and education ==
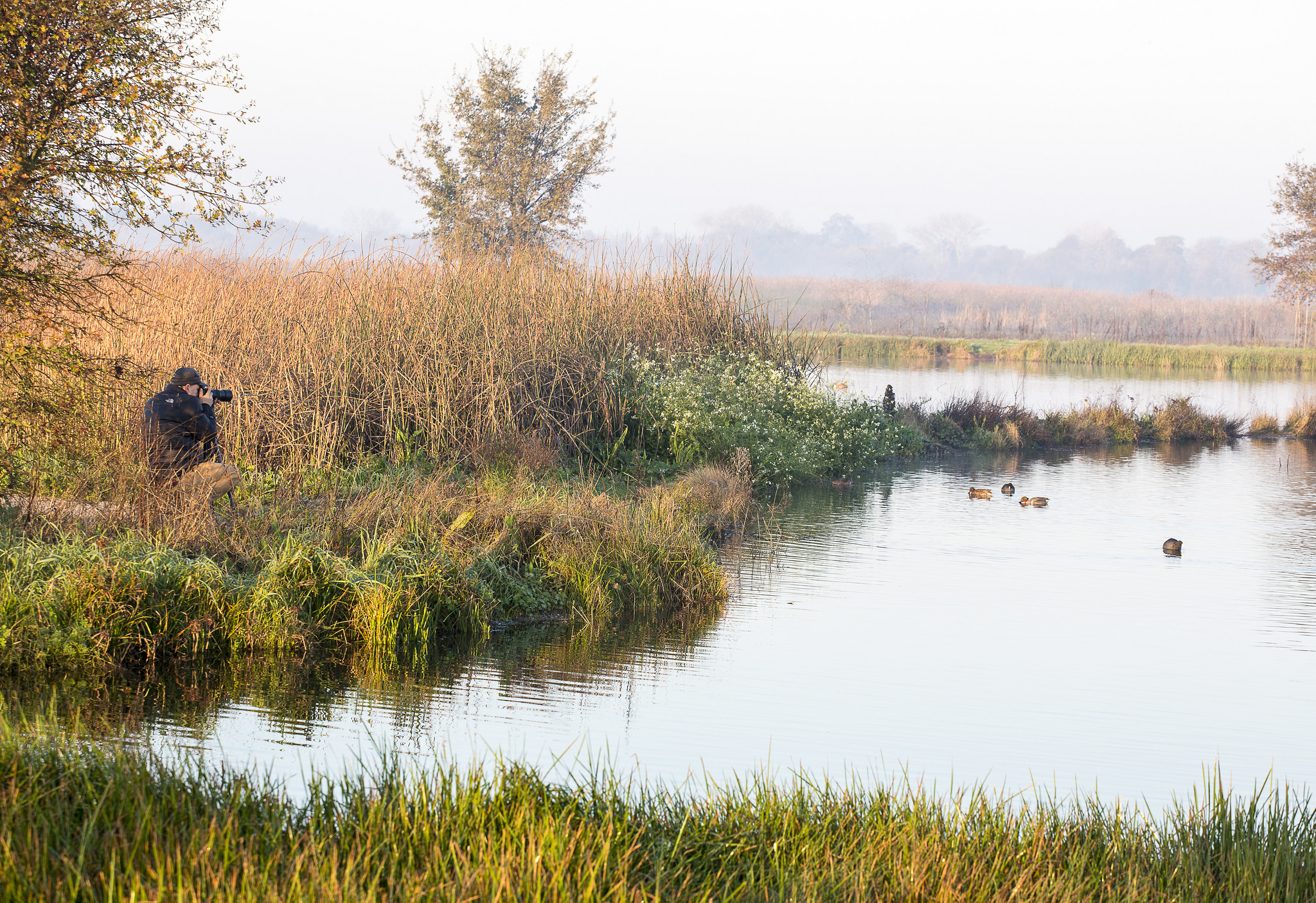
Wildlife photographer in the preserve

The Cosumnes River Preserve Visitor Center is the hub for all activities concerning the preserve. Educational workshops, field trips and activity packets for teachers and students are provided through the visitor center.

Recreation uses include wildlife-viewing, paddling, photography, nature study and limited fishing. The launch site for paddling is near the visitor center and a self-guided trip brochure with map is available. Tidal influence from the ocean is evident here with water levels changing several feet each day, exposing mudflats and sandbars. There are several named sloughs both east and west of the visitor center. Wood Duck Slough is the easternmost slough and has views of the Tall Forest, with large valley oaks overhanging the water and providing deep shade. "The scene is reminiscent of Bogart and Hepburn on the African Queen", writes author Charlie Pike in his book, Paddling Northern California.

Hiking trails include short "walks" that showcase wetland plants and animals, to longer trails, such as the 7 miles (11 km) roundtrip Howard Ranch trail that has vernal pools, riparian habitat and views of oak woodland and the Sierra Nevada Mountains.

There is also a driving tour which allows visitors to see the scope of the conservation project, showing properties that are closed to the public.

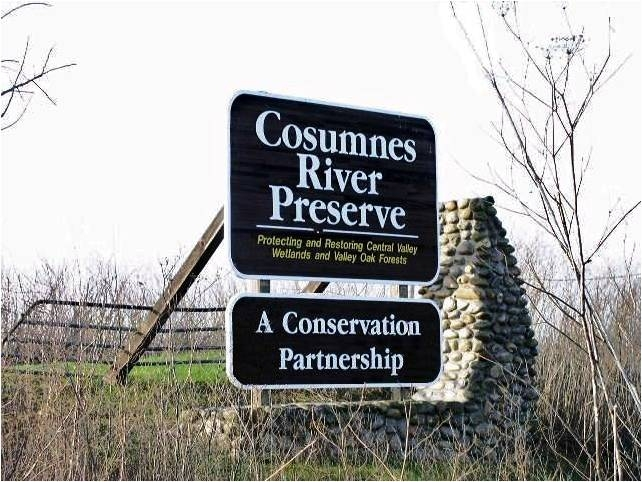
Picture of Cosumnes River Preserve sign

== Volunteer opportunities ==
The Cosumnes River Preserve relies on volunteers to inform the public about plants and animals found within the preserve as well as helping the staff with restoration, conservation, and preservation. After becoming trained as a volunteer naturalist, many different volunteering options are available. Volunteer Naturalist training at the Cosumnes River Preserve takes two training days covering plant and animal species present, volunteer opportunities, and information about the organizations that work with the preserve.

Volunteers in the visitor center help to answer questions by visitors. Restoration projects in the form of the removal of invasive plants or creating wood duck boxes for wood ducks is also an option. Bird and raptor surveys are done at least once a year to get a population estimate on birds of prey and waterfowl that migrate or live within the Cosumnes River Preserve. Other volunteer options are available such as working with the paddle team, leading guided nature walks, or helping with the mountain lion research team. The paddle team takes visitors on tours of the Cosumnes River throughout the year. Some of the paddle tours include the bat paddle, which allows visitors to witness tens of thousands of Mexican free-tailed bats feed during sunset right over the heads of the visitors. The mountain lion research team gets to access closed parts of the preserve and places or checks game cameras to observe mountain lions that reside around the preserve.
