= Cosumnes River =

River in northern California, United States

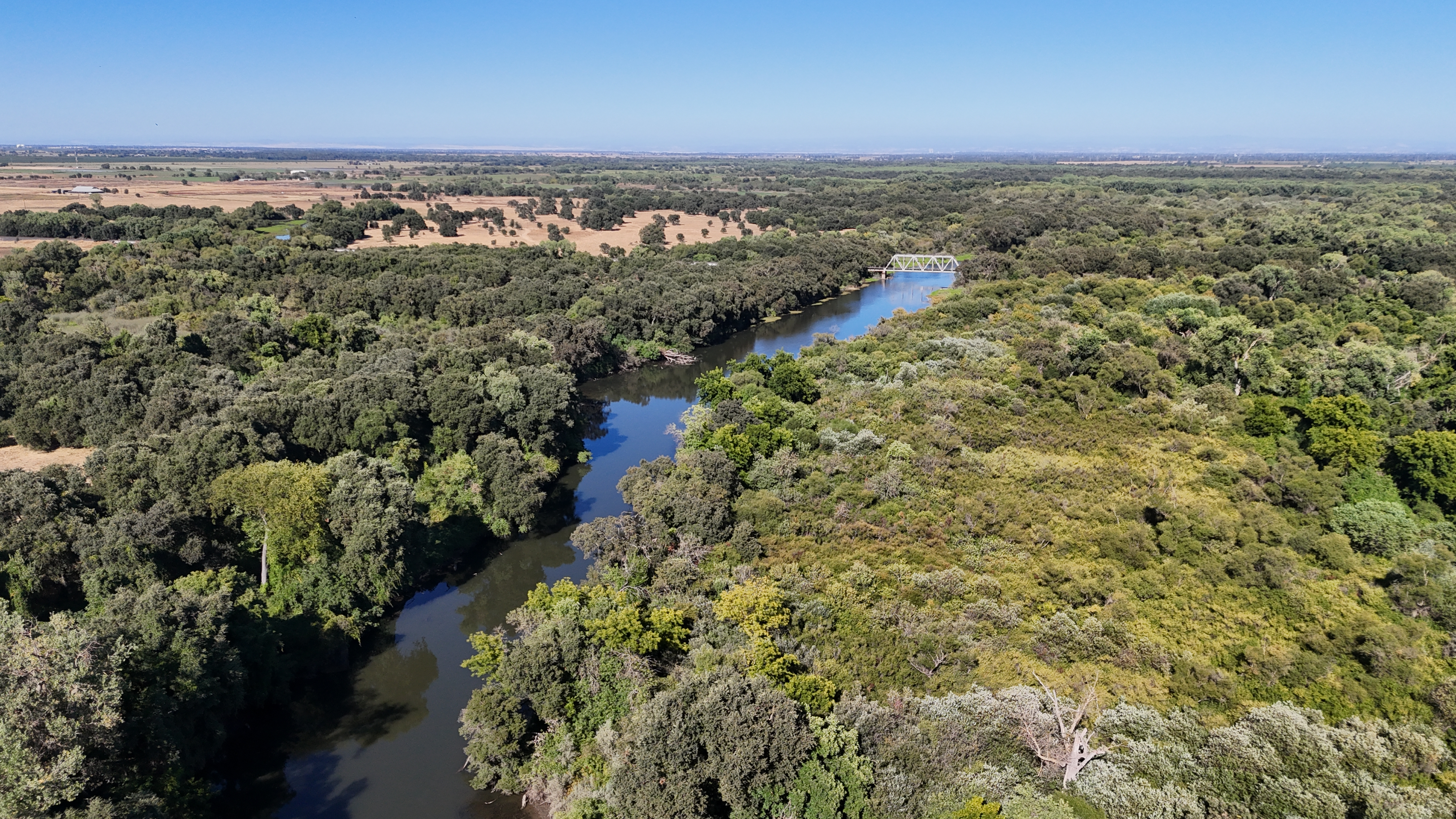
- The Lower Cosumnes River near the Cosumnes River Preserve

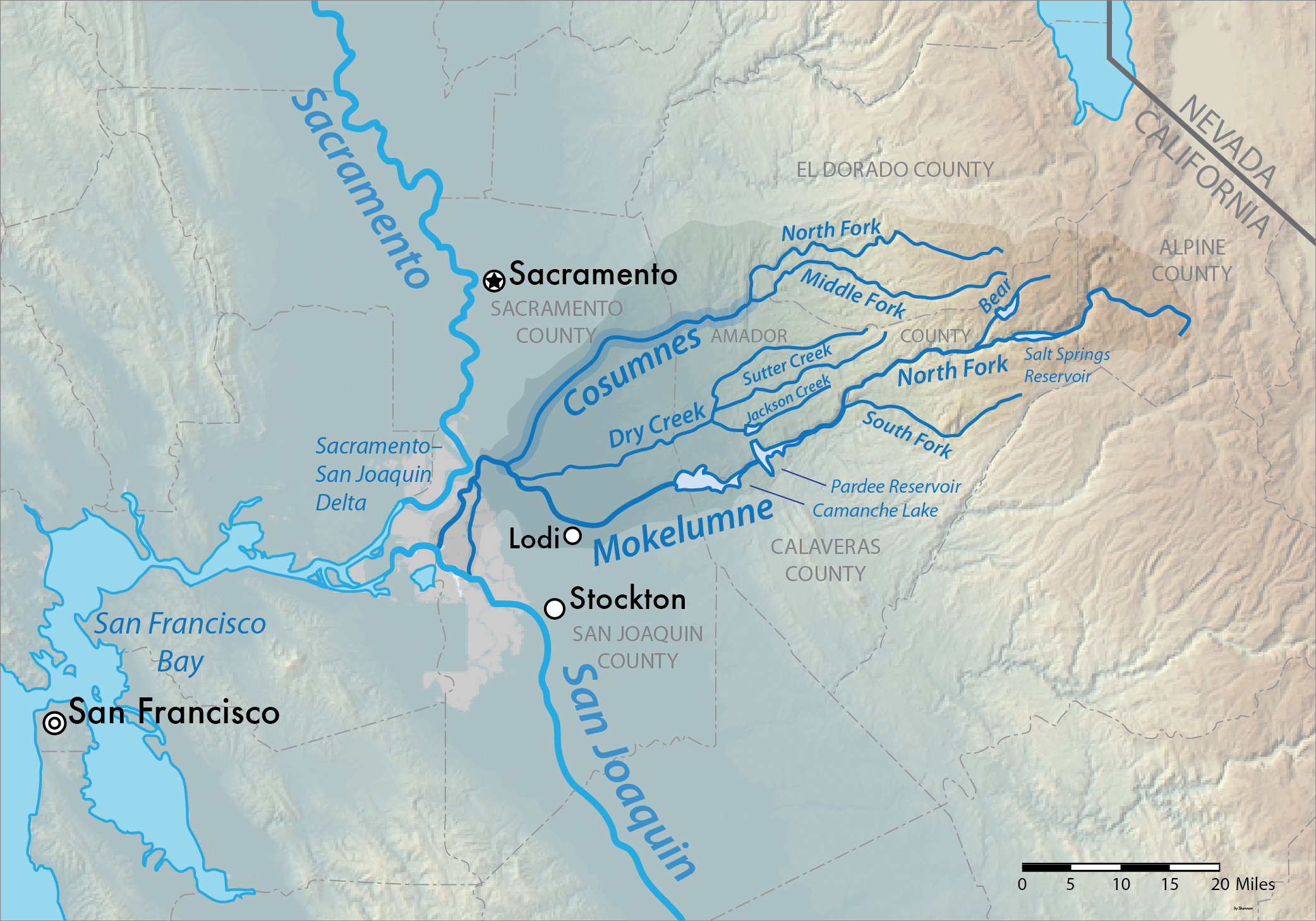
- Map of the Mokelumne River watershed, with the Cosumnes River highlighted

Location
- Country: United States
- State: California
- Cities: Plymouth, Rancho Murieta, Sloughhouse, Wilton, Elk Grove, Galt.

Physical characteristics
- Source: Sierra Nevada
  - location: Confluence of North and Middle Forks, El Dorado County
  - coordinates: 38°33′13″N 120°50′50″W
  - elevation: 787 ft (240 m)
- Mouth: Mokelumne River
  - location: Near Galt, Sacramento County
  - coordinates: 38°15′20″N 121°26′21″W
  - elevation: 13 ft (4.0 m)
- Length: 52.5 mi (84.5 km)
- Basin size: 724 sq mi (1,880 km^{2})
- Discharge
  - location: Michigan Bar
  - average: 492 cu ft/s (13.9 m^{3}/s)
  - minimum: 0 cu ft/s (0 m^{3}/s)
  - maximum: 93,000 cu ft/s (2,600 m^{3}/s)

Basin features
- Tributaries
  - left: Middle Fork Cosumnes River
  - right: North Fork Cosumnes River; Camp Creek; Baltic Creek

The Cosumnes River is a river in northern California in the United States. It rises on the western slope of the Sierra Nevada and flows approximately 52.5 miles (84.5 km) into the Central Valley, emptying into the Mokelumne River in the Sacramento-San Joaquin Delta.

The Cosumnes is one of very few rivers in the western Sierra without major dams. The Nature Conservancy's Cosumnes River Preserve is located just upstream from the Delta. Towns and cities along the Cosumnes River include Plymouth, Rancho Murieta, Sloughhouse, Wilton, Elk Grove, and Galt.

The California Office of Environmental Health Hazard Assessment has issued an advisory regarding fish caught from the body of water.

== Name ==
The Cosumnes River is thought to have been named as the Mokelumne and Tuolumne rivers were, using the "-umne" suffix meaning "people of". The prefix is derived from the Miwok word "kosum" meaning "salmon". Chinook Salmon runs are rarely, if ever, seen above Rancho Murieta as a result of diversions in the area.

Many locals pronounce the river's name /kənˈsuːmnəs/, inserting an "n" where there is none in the first syllable. Given the etymological similarity between "Cosumnes," on the one hand, and "Tuolumne" and "Mokelumne" on the other (see next paragraph), a case can be made that the most accurate historical pronunciation is "kasumme," since the "n" is essentially silent in the pronunciation of both "Tuolumne" and Mokelumne," and there is no "s" or "z" sound at the end of those names. An older pronunciation common among Central Valley locals is /kənˈsuːməs/), which includes the epenthetic [n] in the first syllable, omits the initial [n] of the final syllable (as in "Mokelumne" and "Tuolumne"), has the expected value for the letter in an open syllable (created by the omission of the last [n]), and uses a final [s] rather than a [z].

Cosumnes River College, a two-year community college located in the southern part of Sacramento, California is named after the river being located only a few miles off campus. CRC's mascot is the Hawk due to the number of hawks that inhabit the river area.

== Geography ==
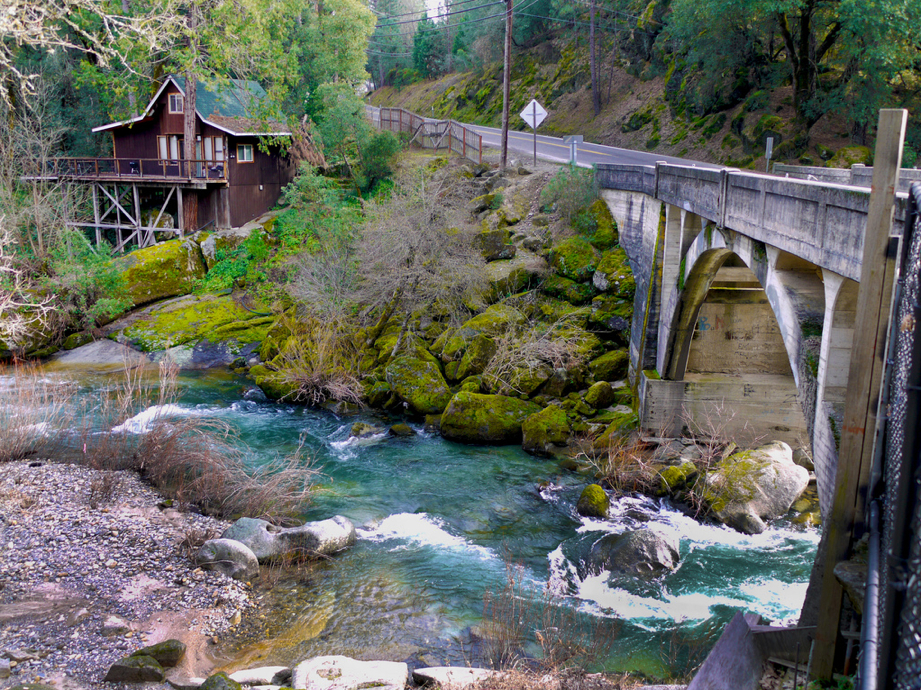
North Fork of the Cosumnes River

Flowing from the western slope of the central Sierra Nevada mountains, the Cosumnes starts as North, Middle and South forks cutting canyons through the El Dorado and Amador County Gold Country before converging just east of Highway 49. The North Fork, about 49.3 miles (79.3 km) long, begins at the Singleton Springs in El Dorado County, at the head of Leek Spring Valley, 7,400 feet (2,300 m) above sea level. It flows west, past the unincorporated community of Meiss, receiving Van Horn Creek and Butte Creek from the right. At Somerset, it is joined by its largest tributary, Camp Creek, from the right. Below Camp Creek it flows through the granite narrows of the Cosumnes River Gorge, a popular rock-climbing area. The river then turns abruptly south and passes Nashville before joining the Middle Fork near Enterprise.

The Middle Fork, 44.2 miles (71.1 km) long, also starts in El Dorado County, just two ridges south of the headwaters of the North Fork. It flows westward for its entire course, roughly parallel to the North Fork. The upper half of the river flows down a steep canyon, past Croft, receiving Dogtown Creek from the right at Omo Ranch. Below Omo Ranch it flows through a gentler valley, past Outingdale, then enters another short canyon where it receives the South Fork Cosumnes River from the left. The smaller South Fork, about 20 miles (32 km) long, flows generally west then northwest along the El Dorado/Amador County line, to join the Middle Fork. Shortly below this confluence the combined rivers join with the North Fork to form the Cosumnes River.

The Cosumnes River proper continues west, receiving Big Indian Creek from the south and passing under SR 49 (Golden Chain Highway). It winds through the scenic Sierra foothills through a series of short canyons separated by small ranching valleys. It receives Big Canyon Creek from the right, then Little Indian Creek from the left, before flowing through its last gorge and emerging at the former mining site of Michigan Bar. The entire stretch of the Cosumnes River between the confluence of the forks and a point one mile (1.6 km) above Michigan Bar define the El Dorado/Amador County line; below this point, the river flows into southern Sacramento County.

The Cosumnes flows west through Rancho Murieta, an affluent outer suburb of the Sacramento metropolitan area. Two small diversion dams cross the river near Van Vleck Park just upstream from the town. Below Rancho Murieta the Cosumnes flows through an agricultural valley, turning southwest near Sloughhouse. A few miles downstream the Folsom South Canal crosses under the Cosumnes River via an inverted siphon. The Cosumnes continues southwest, passing Sheldon and Wilton, receives Deer Creek from the right, then is crossed by Highway 99 near Elk Grove. Below Highway 99 it enters the nearly 50,000-acre (20,000 ha) Cosumnes River Preserve, which include some of the largest remaining wetlands and riparian areas in the Central Valley. It enters the Sacramento–San Joaquin River Delta near Mokelumne City, turning west once more to join the Mokelumne on the border of Sacramento County and San Joaquin County.

== River modifications ==
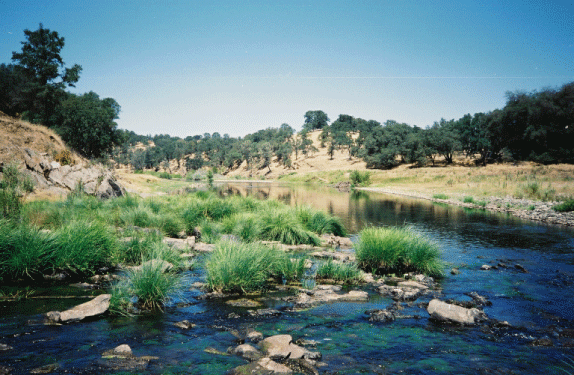
Cosumnes River at Michigan Bar, near the site of a proposed flood control dam

As one of the last rivers flowing from the west slope of the Sierra without a major dam, the Cosumnes is a vital example of a healthy watershed. However, its salmon and steelhead populations have been harmed by invasive fish species and pollution from illegal mining activity, as well as the two irrigation diversion structures near Rancho Murieta. There are plans to re-introduce salmon spawning into the river.

Some water is diverted from two tributaries of the North Fork – Camp Creek and Sly Park Creek – for irrigation in the Camino area. Sly Park Dam, which creates 41,000-acre-foot (51,000,000 m^{3}) Jenkinson Lake, is the largest water storage facility in the Cosumnes River watershed. The dam and reservoir are part of the extensive Central Valley Project. However, the project has negligible effects on river flows, and does not block historic salmon spawning runs.

Dams have been proposed to be built on the main stem to control flows, but these plans have largely stalled because of the river's unique free-flowing status and its importance as a wildlife habitat. Sacramento County officials continue to lobby for the construction of a flood-control dry dam above Rancho Murieta at Michigan Bar. Such proposals are still the subject of ongoing debate.

== Flooding History ==
Over the past few decades, the Cosumnes River Watershed has experienced significant, sometimes devastating, flooding. The most notable flooding occurred in 1986, 1997, 2017, and 2023. The 1997 storm was the largest recorded event on the Cosumnes River, with peak flow of 97,000 cubic feet per second at the Michigan Bar stream gauge estimated to be close to a 200-year event. Many Cosumnes levees breached during this storm.

Reclamation District 800, a California Reclamation District, is responsible for managing a series of levees along the Cosumnes River stretching from the edge of the community of Rancho Murieta to just upstream of California State Route 99.

== See also ==
- List of rivers of California
