= McClatchy (surname) =

McClatchy is a surname. Notable persons with that name include:

- Carlos K. McClatchy (1927–1989), American journalist and publisher; grandson of Charles Kenny McClatchy
- Charles Kenny McClatchy (1858–1936), American journalist and publisher
- C. K. McClatchy High School Sacramento high school named in honor of Charles Kenny McClatchy
- Eleanor McClatchy (1895–1980), American publisher, Charles Kenny McClatchy's youngest daughter
- J. D. McClatchy (1945–2018), American poet and literary critic
- James McClatchy (1824–1883), American journalist and publisher
- James B. McClatchy (1920–2006), American journalist and publisher
- Kevin McClatchy (born 1963), American entrepreneur and baseball executive
- Lulu McClatchy, Australian actress
- Valentine S. McClatchy (1857–1938), American journalist and publisher

== See also ==
- McClatchey, a surname
