= Broadway Sacramento =

Arts organization in California, US

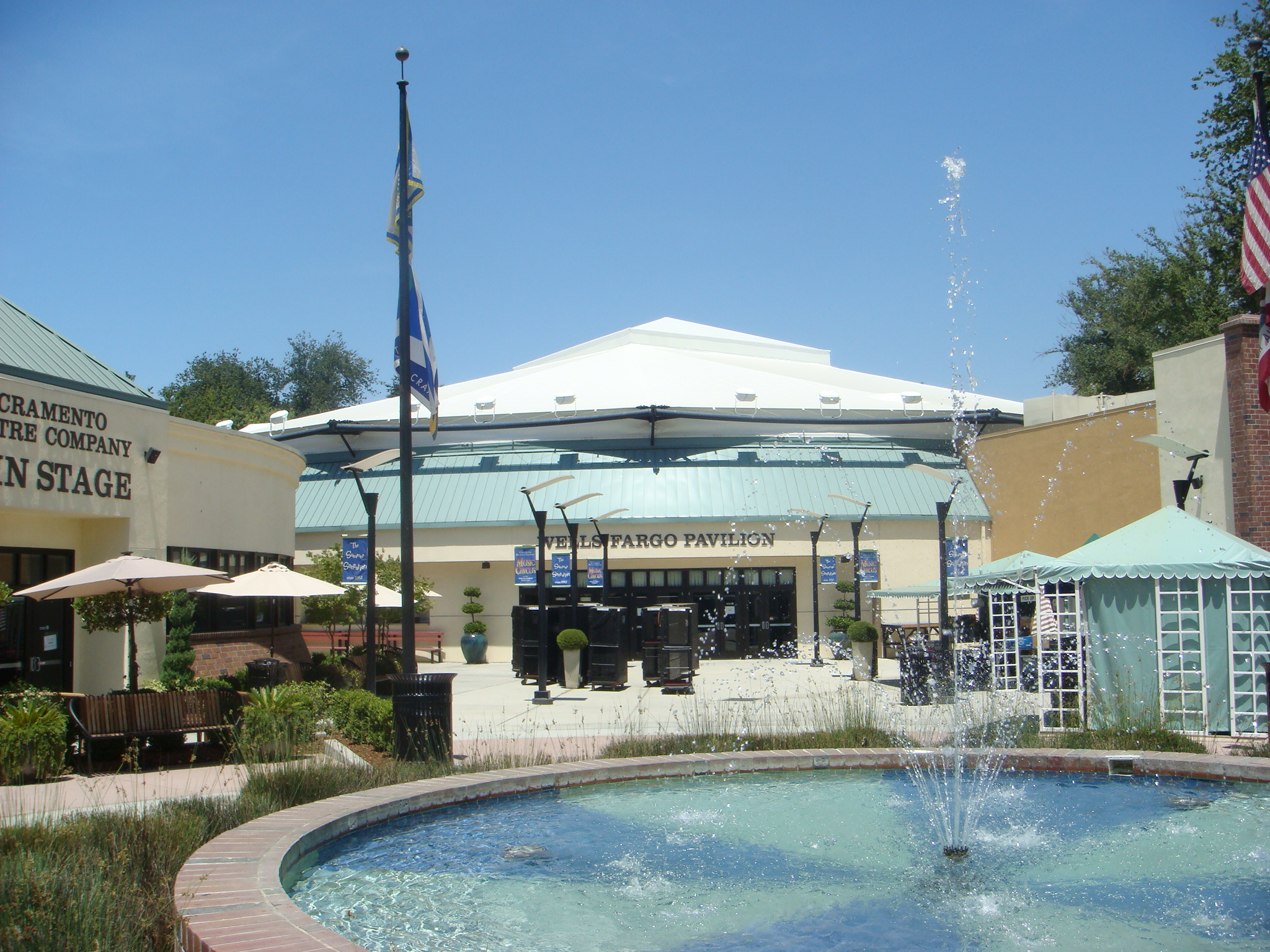
- The UC Davis Health Pavilion, Broadway Sacramento's home for the Broadway At Music Circus series
- Formation: 1951 (as the Sacramento Light Opera Association and California Musical Theatre)
- Type: Summer stock theater Presenters
- Location(s): 15th and H St Sacramento California
- Website: broadwaysacramento.com

Broadway Sacramento (formerly California Musical Theatre) is the largest nonprofit arts organization (primarily producing musical theatre) in the state of California and the city of Sacramento's oldest professional performing arts company. Its summer stock theatre, Music Circus, has been producing Broadway-style musicals since 1951.

In 2002 Music Circus produced its last season under a traditional canvas circus tent. The following year the company opened the Wells Fargo Pavilion. Built over the original concrete tent foundations, the new facility was designed to emulate a circus tent to continue the Music Circus tradition of a canvas big top. The enclosed, permanent architecture of the arena theatre is covered by an insulated space-age fabric. Recently in 2021, the Wells Fargo Pavilion has been renamed to the UC Davis Health Pavilion.

== History ==
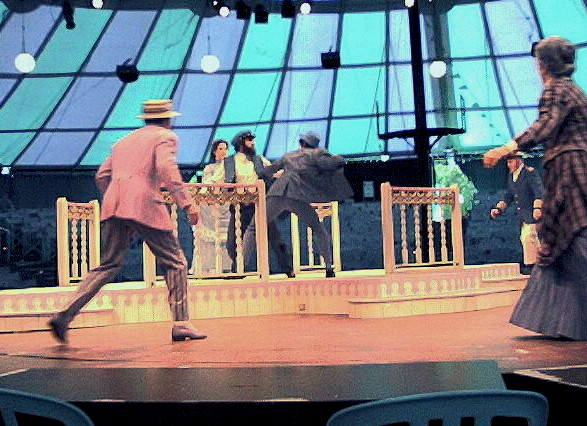
Rehearsal of "Showboat" at Sacramento Music Circus 2001

In 1949 the original Music Circus began its operations in a vacant field in Lambertville, New Jersey. Begun by St. John Terrell as a summer stock theatre hybrid, mixing musical theatre within a circus tent, the new musical theatre performed in the round. The unique experience gained popularity through the 1950s and 1960s. Theatres copied the format and name, eventually spawning similar Music Circus theatres along the East Coast as far south as Miami.

In California, producers Russell Lewis and Howard Young began scouting a location to build their theater and were lured to Sacramento by Sacramento Bee president Eleanor McClatchy. The theatre opened with a production of Show Boat, the same show which opened the original Lambertville theatre as well as the North Shore Music Theatre. In 1951 the Sacramento Music Circus tent went up for the first time under the operations of what was originally known as the Sacramento Light Opera Association. McClatchy had been a patron of the Sacramento Civic Theatre (now known as Sacramento Theatre Company). Its facility had a large parking area that would be the home to the original Music Circus tent.

In April 2018 President and CEO of California Musical Theatre, Richard Lewis, announced that the company would be officially changing its name to Broadway Sacramento. Before the name change, Broadway Sacramento was the name of their Broadway musical touring season. During his announcement of the parent company name change, he also said that the name of both theater series would be changing. The touring series at the Safe Credit Union Performing Arts Center is now called Broadway On Tour and the summer series at the now, UC Davis Health Pavilion is now called Broadway At Music Circus.

== Broadway at Music Circus ==
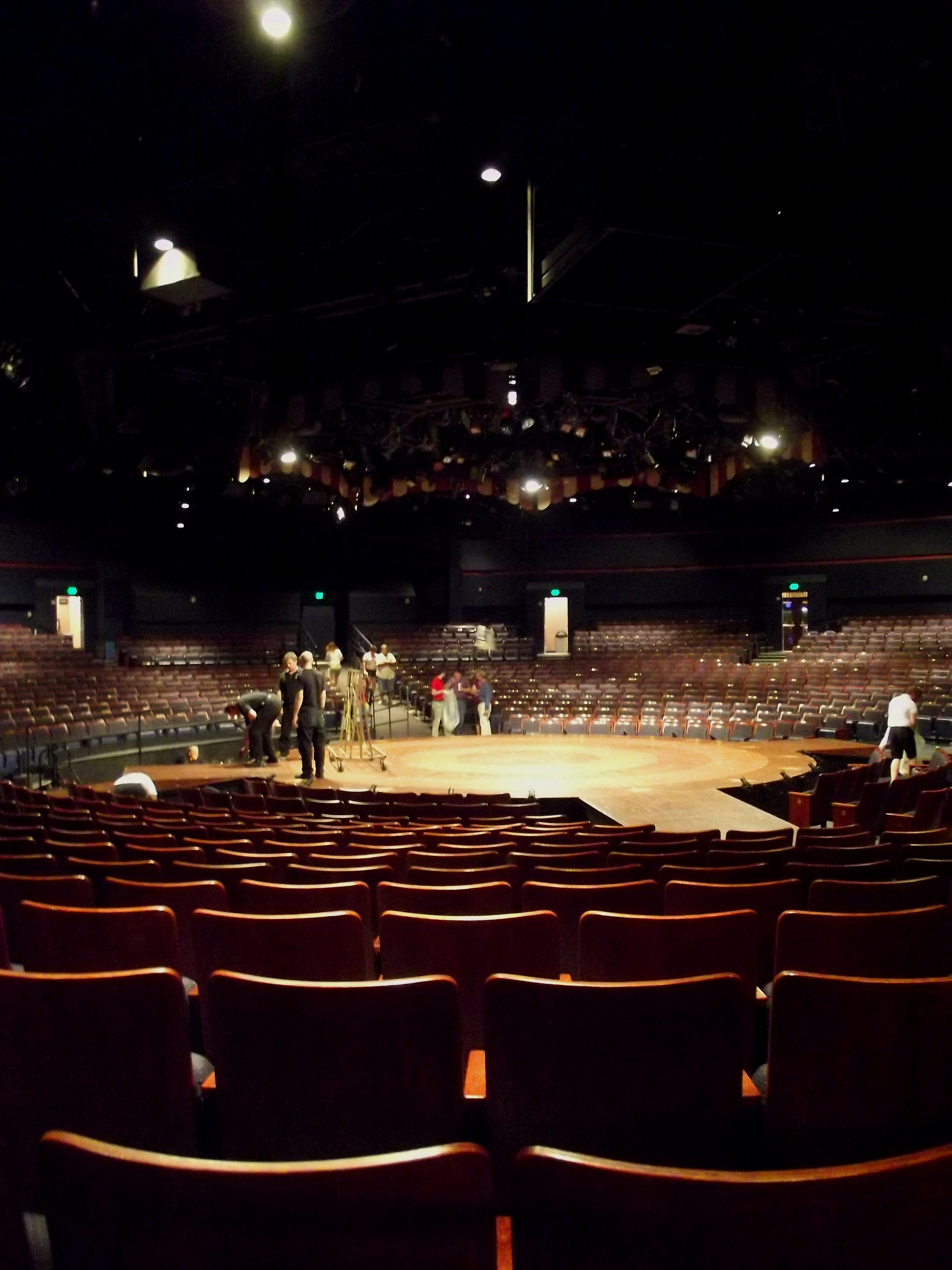
The Music Circus stage inside the UC Davis Health Pavilion in 2011

From 1951 to 1989 the summer Music Circus program was the only season produced by the Sacramento Light Opera Association. Most of those years under the direction of Lewis and Young. Its summer stock performances have been located in nearly the same location since its conception. Actors, directors and designers from all across the country travel to Sacramento to build productions entirely original. The current executive producer, Richard Lewis, is the son of the original producer Russell Lewis. Sacramento Music Circus was once one of many summer stock musical theatres performing in the round. Today it is now one of only a few professional theatres producing musicals in an arena setting.

== Broadway on Tour ==
Originally known as the Music Circus Winter Season and later as The Broadway Series, productions presented by Broadway on Tour are performed during Music Circus' "off season". Generally, these are touring productions of current musicals performed at the Community Center Theater. Starting in 1989, the series of shows has included The Unsinkable Molly Brown, The Phantom of the Opera, Chicago and The Producers. It is still continuing today with Christmas Carol in December 2026. Broadway Sacramento is a founding member of the National Alliance for Musical Theatre and Executive Producer Richard Lewis is a member of the League of American Theatres and Producers.
