= Gary B. Pruitt =

American attorney and businessman (born 1957)

Gary Pruitt
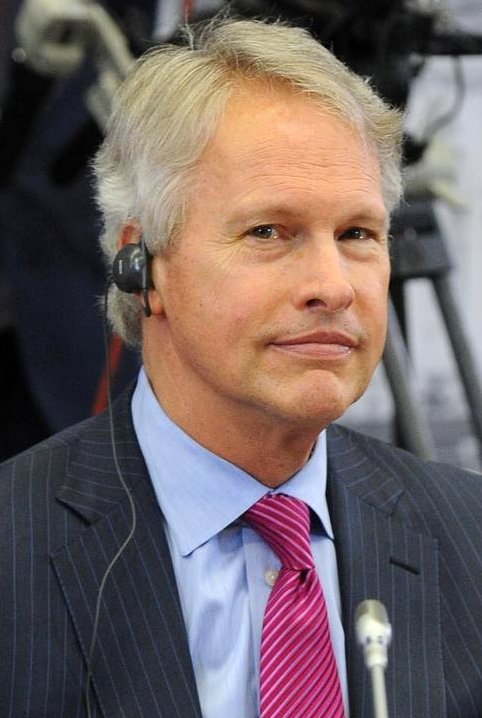
- Born: c. 1957 (age 62–63); Virginia, U.S.
- Education: University of Florida (BA); University of California, Berkeley (MPP, JD)
- Occupations: Former President and CEO of the Associated Press

Gary B. Pruitt (born c. 1957) is an American attorney and businessman, who was as the president and CEO of the Associated Press. He was the CEO, president, and chairman of the board of McClatchy, an American publishing company that operates 29 daily newspapers in fourteen states.

== Early life and education ==
Pruitt was born in Virginia and raised in Satellite Beach, Florida. He earned a Bachelor of Arts degree from the University of Florida, Masters of Public Policy from University of California, Berkeley, and a Juris Doctor from the UC Berkeley School of Law.

== Career ==
Pruitt was counsel for McClatchy from 1984 to 1987, corporate Secretary and General Counsel from 1987 to 1998, publisher for The Fresno Bee from 1991 to 1994, general counsel from 1987 to 1991, and Vice President for Operations and Technology from 1991 to 1994. He was Chief Operating Officer from 1995 to 1996. He became President starting in 1995, Chief Executive Officer in 1996, and Chairman in 2001. During his leadership Pruitt led the ill-fated acquisition of Knight Ridder group leading to debt and layoffs at McClatchy Papers.

In April 2012 it was announced he would become CEO of the Associated Press. Kevin McClatchy assumed his chairman of the board role and Patrick J. Talamantes assumed the CEO role.

He is a former chairman of the Newspaper Association of America and James Irvine Foundation, and a former vice chairman of the Associated Press Board of Directors. He is on the Advisory Board of the USC Annenberg School Center on Communication Leadership & Policy.

Business positions
Preceded by Erwin Potts	McClatchy CEO; 1996–2012	Succeeded by Patrick J. Talamantes
