= Clovis Independent =

Defunct American newspaper in California, US

- Type: Weekly newspaper
- Owner: The McClatchy Company
- Founder(s): May Case; Spurgeon S. Case
- Editor: Patti J. Lippert
- Founded: 1919; 107 years ago
- Ceased publication: 2008; 18 years ago
- Language: English
- Headquarters: Clovis, California
- Country: United States
- ISSN: 1068-5944
- OCLC number: 528728711
- Website: clovisindependent.co

The Clovis Independent was an American newspaper founded in 1919 that ceased its publication in 2008, under its last editor, Patti J. Lippert. It served Clovis, California and Fresno County. The end of the paper was part of a larger cost-cutting effort by The McClatchy Company, which resulted in layoffs across many McClatchy papers, including the Fresno Bee and Sacramento Bee.

== History ==
In 1919, the Clovis Independent was established by Spurgeon S. Case and May Case. Mrs. Case had built a reputation as a reporter in Purcell, Oklahoma at the Register.

In 1930, an explosion and resulting fire destroyed the Independent's building and printing machinery. In 1937, the Cases sold the paper to Myron A. Hinkley. May Case continued to work for the paper until her death.

In 1942, Hinkley purchased the Clovis Tribune from Fred H. Weigel and absorbed it into his paper. In 1949, Independent founder S.S. Case died. In July 1959, Hinkley sold the paper to Anthony Turano.

The City of Clovis designated October 8, 1959, as May Case Day. At that time, she also received a citation from the U.S. Treasury Department for purchasing the first U.S. Treasury bonds after they were made available to the public and for inspiring others to also buy these bonds. In 1964, she was named "Newspaper Girl of the Year" at the California Press Women's annual meeting. In 1967, May Case died at the age of 93. At that time she was known as the "oldest working newspaperwoman in the United States."

In 1968, Russ Mazzei, owner of the Clovis Free Press, purchased the Independent and merged the two papers under the Independent name. In 1975, Mazzei founded the Clovis Hall of Fame. In 1977, former owner Hinkley died. In 1978, Mazzei was sued for libel by Fresno County District Attorney William A. Smith and Clovis Police Captain Gino Pishione. In turn, he sued them for allegedly violating his civil rights and claimed the two planned to launch a rival paper. In 1983, Mazzei lost in court and a jury awarded Pishione $33,000 in damages.

In 1979, McClatchy acquired the Independent. In 1996, the paper's publisher, Earl Wright Jr., arranged for the football team of the town of Clovis, California to play the football team from the town of Clovis, New Mexico. The paper published its last issue on June 27, 2008. In response, Marine Kenny Melchor and his wife Donna founded a new paper called the Clovis Roundup. It ceased in February 2026 after the owner suffered from health issues. In April 2026, Terry Wild founded The Clovis Times, a spiritual successor to both the Independent and the Roundup.

== Awards ==
The newspaper placed second in in-depth reporting category in the California Newspaper Publishers Association's annual Better Newspapers Contest in 1987. It won first place for sports coverage and first-place sports story in 2005.
