= Kevin McClatchy =

American newspaper and baseball executive

- Born: January 13, 1963 (age 63); Sacramento, California, U.S.
- Education: University of California, Santa Barbara
- Occupation: Chairman of McClatchy
- Known for: Former owner of Pittsburgh Pirates

Kevin S. McClatchy (born January 13, 1963) is an American business executive who is the chairman of McClatchy, a national publishing company. He was formerly an owner of the Pittsburgh Pirates baseball team, where he led a group of investors that purchased the team in 1996 and remained the team's CEO and lead owner until 2007.

== Early life ==
McClatchy was born in Sacramento, California, the son of C. K. McClatchy II and Grace Kennan. He is a grandson of the diplomat and historian George F. Kennan. His great-grandfather Charles Kenny McClatchy edited The Sacramento Bee for 53 years and was a founder of McClatchy Newspapers. His father "CK" ran the paper, and nurtured it to become public, and with Erwin Potts' leadership, McClatchy acquired papers throughout the US, and became the predominant media leader of journalism in the US market. An alumnus of the Trinity-Pawling School in Pawling, New York, McClatchy went on to graduate from the University of California, Santa Barbara, where he was a member of the Sigma Alpha Epsilon fraternity.

== Career ==
McClatchy is the chairman of the family-owned McClatchy Media Company, of which McClatchy Newspapers was the forerunner. He succeeded Gary B. Pruitt as chairman of the company in April 2012). Prior to purchasing the Pirates, he owned the minor-league Modesto A's.

McClatchy was the leader and plurality investor in a group that paid $95 million ($201 million today) for the Pittsburgh Pirates in February 1996. McClatchy immediately assumed the posts of managing general partner and chief executive officer, becoming the public face of the ownership group. McClatchy was a member of Major League Baseball's executive council and the labor and international committees.

At some point after 2005, which is not entirely known because the Pirates are a private corporation, Wheeling, West Virginia-based newspaper publisher G. Ogden Nutting and his family became the plurality and then majority owners in the franchise. Bob Nutting, Ogden's son, had already been chairman of the board since 2002. The Nuttings, however, mostly shied from the spotlight and allowed McClatchy to continue as the main or even sole voice of the ownership group.

In 2006, McClatchy speculated openly about resigning, possibly even selling the team, if the Pirates did not improve. He affirmed that he was frustrated with his own team, referencing popular and political complaints about the "promise" he made that the publicly funded PNC Park would provide the owners with all the resources they needed to field a winning team. On October 4, 2006, however, McClatchy announced that despite another losing season, he would remain in his offices, and made only a few minor personnel changes.

On January 12, 2007, the Pirates announced that Nutting would replace McClatchy as the Pirates principal owner, though McClatchy stayed on as CEO and operating head of the franchise. In July 2007, it was announced that McClatchy would step down as CEO after the 2007 MLB season. On September 8, 2007, Ken Rosenthal of Fox Sports reported that baseball executive Frank Coonelly would be hired by the Pirates to replace McClatchy as CEO. McClatchy sold his remaining shares of the franchise in 2009.

During McClatchy's time as lead owner, the Pirates never achieved a winning season. The closest they came was in 1997, when they finished 79-83–which was also the only time they finished higher than third in their division.

== Personal life ==
In September 2012, McClatchy came out as gay in an interview with Frank Bruni of The New York Times.

As of 2013, McClatchy continues to live in Ligonier Township, Pennsylvania.
