= C. K. McClatchy =

C. K. McClatchy may refer to:

- Charles Kenny McClatchy (1858–1936), editor of The Sacramento Bee and a founder of McClatchy Newspapers
- C. K. McClatchy II (1927-1989), president of McClatchy Newspapers
- C. K. McClatchy High School, a high school in Sacramento, California
