= James B. McClatchy =

American journalist and publisher

James Briggs McClatchy (17 December 1920 – 26 May 2006) was an American journalist and publisher. He was a journalist at McClatchy Company newspapers, including The Fresno Bee and The Sacramento Bee. He was publisher of The McClatchy Company from 1987 to 2005, having been chairman since 1980.

McClatchy was born in Sacramento, California, and grew up in Fresno. He was the son of Carlos K. McLatchy and the great-grandson of the nineteenth century publisher James McClatchy. He spent much of his free time working to improve conditions in the Central Valley through an organization called Valley Vision and also helping children of immigrants from Central Valley learn English.

McClatchy began his career as a copy boy at the age of 19 for The Fresno Bee. In 1947, he served as the general assignment and education reporter for The Sacramento Bee. Here he focused his works on oppressive working conditions for migrant workers, military operations in the Pacific, and the initiative to make Hawaii become a state. McClatchy eventually worked his way up to owning and operating a number of small newspapers in California. He retired in 2005. He served as president of the Inter American Press Association (1991–1992).

McClatchy died at the age of 85 on 26 May 2006 at his home in Carmichael, California, from an infection after a recent operation.
