= Eleanor McClatchy =

American newspaper executive

Eleanor Grace McClatchy (1895–1980) was an American newspaper executive, serving as president of the McClatchy newspapers from 1936 until 1978.

She was the youngest daughter of Charles Kenny McClatchy.

She was studying to be a playwright at Columbia University when her father asked her to take over the family business the "three Bees" (The Sacramento Bee, The Modesto Bee and The Fresno Bee).

Under her watch, the company expanded its interest to six daily newspapers, four radio stations and one television station.

Her love for theatre continued and she was among the founders of the Sacramento Civic Repertory Theater in 1942 with the construction of the Eaglet Theater in 1949.

Business positions
Preceded by Charles Kenny McClatchy	McClatchy President; 1936–1978	Succeeded by C. K. McClatchy
