= Valentine S. McClatchy =

American newspaper owner and journalist

V. S. McClatchy
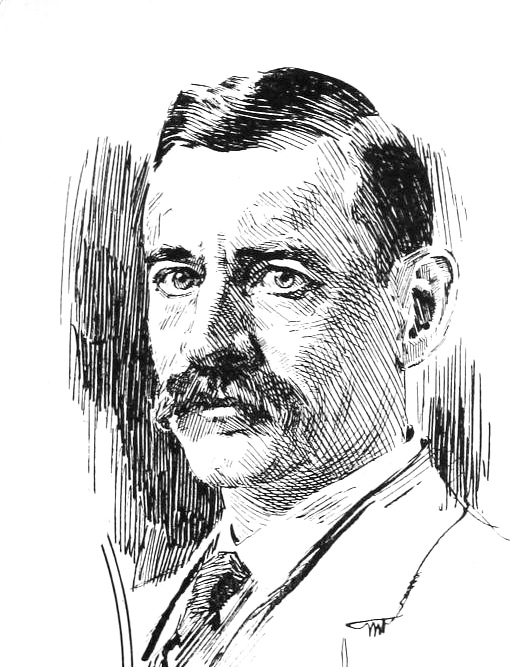
- Born: August 29, 1857
- Died: May 15, 1938 (aged 80)
- Education: Santa Clara University
- Occupation: Journalist

Valentine Stuart McClatchy (August 29, 1857 – May 15, 1938) was an American newspaper owner and journalist. As publisher of The Sacramento Bee (now The McClatchy Company) from the time of his father's death in 1883, co-owning the paper with his brother Charles K. McClatchy until 1923. After leaving the newspaper business, he became a leading figure in the anti-Japanese movement in California, forming key exclusionary groups to lobby for alien land laws and race-based limits on immigration and naturalization.

== Early life and career ==
McClatchy was the son of the prominent nineteenth-century publisher James McClatchy, he was hired by John Rollin Ridge, founder of the Sacramento Bee (known as the Daily Bee when he became editor in 1857). "V.S." graduated from Santa Clara College in 1877. After the elder McClatchy died in 1883, he took on joint ownership of the Bee with his brother. "C.K." served as the editor, while Valentine took on the role of publisher. As early as 1915, he began writing about the menace posed by Japanese immigrants. By 1919, he had largely retired from the paper, turning his efforts instead to publishing a series of anti-Japanese pamphlets. He officially left the Bee in 1923, when C.K. bought him out to take sole control of the company. The Sacramento Bee ran upwards of 90 "racially demeaning" anti-Japanese editorial cartoons between 1906 and 1945.

== Anti-immigration lobbying ==
China opened migration into California from Asia. This increased the nativism within the United States, which culminated into the 1882 Chinese Exclusion Act. With more Asian people coming at the turn of the century, adversaries arose to counter the migration of the Asian people. The first exclusionary league formed was the Japanese and Korean Exclusion League, with a common and vested interest in keeping the Asiatic peoples from immigrating into America. Two years later, the group renamed themselves the Asiatic Exclusion League (AEL). The AEL’s purpose was the same as its predecessor, the exclusionary group, only expanded their nativist goals to affect other Asiatic peoples.

The AEL’s focus was primarily based upon limiting Asiatic migration altogether. This was done through amending some of the existing laws like the 1913 California Alien Land Law Act with revisions that made it harder for Asiatic people to reside in California. McClatchy was able to line himself up with nativist groups and take members from the AEL and Native Sons of the Golden West (he was a member of Pacific Parler No. 10), and The Japanese Exclusion League to create an exclusionary group that not only focused on Asiatic Immigration but, also on Mexican and Filipino immigration. In 1925, the California Joint Immigration Committee (CJIC) was formed with McClatchy serving as the Secretary of the CJIC. McClatchy surrounded himself with prominent Californian politicians at the time, such as Attorney General Ulysses S. Webb, Governor Hiram Johnson, and Senator James D. Phelan. The CJIC through McClatchy was also able to get aid from other organizations such as the California State Federation of Labor.

As secretary, McClatchy wrote and distributed pamphlets published by the CJIC, which focused on guarding immigration from countries that were not Anglo-European origin. He formulated arguments that would only benefit the eugenics belief, which gained popularity after the 1917 Immigration Act.,

With a new purpose of guarding the Immigration gates against all immigrants, the CJIC, through McClatchy, began to adopt precedents through court cases to help create a hierarchy of races. Attempting to use the Thind and Ozawa cases to help differentiate white from the “other.” These cases were able to distinguish asiatic people as a race other than white; however, with immigration from Mexico seemingly increasing post-war, McClatchy was adamant about adopting a test-case for Mexicans to gain a classification of their race to ensure they would not be able to be exempt from the 1924 Immigration Act.

In 1937, he lobbied to strip Kibei, Japanese Americans born in the United States who were sent to Japan to study or visit family for an extended time, of their citizenship if they had lived in Japan for more than a year.

He died of a heart condition on May 15, 1938.

== See also ==
- Yellow Peril
- Anti-Japanese sentiment in the United States
