= Merced Sun-Star =

Newspaper in Merced, California

- Cover of Merced Sun-Star on May 18, 2006
- Type: Daily newspaper
- Format: Broadsheet
- Owner: The McClatchy Company
- Founder(s): Robert Johnson Steele; Rowena Granice Steele
- Publisher: Tim Ritchey
- Editor: Christopher Kirkpatrick
- Founded: 1869 (as San Joaquin Valley Argus)
- Language: English
- Headquarters: 1190 Olive Ave. Merced, CA 95348; United States
- Circulation: 7,926 Daily (as of 2020)
- OCLC number: 20681689
- Website: mercedsunstar.com

The Merced Sun-Star is a daily broadsheet newspaper printed in Merced, California, in the United States. It is owned by McClatchy.

== History ==
In 1862, Robert Johnson Steele, a newspaper publisher who fought in the Mexican–American War as part of the 1st Mississippi Rifles, and his wife Rowena Granice Steele published the first newspaper in Merced County called the Merced Banner. The paper operated for two years until Union soldiers destroyed it in 1864. A year later P.D. Wigginton and J.W. Robertson established the Weekly Merced Herald. The Democratic paper was politically Copperhead. The Steeles returned to Snelling in 1868 to revive the Herald after it ceased. R.J. Steele relaunched the paper on August 28, 1869 as the San Joaquin Valley Argus, writing the Herald had "died by termination of contract."

The Argus relocated to Merced on April 5, 1873, after the county seat was moved to that city. A mob destroyed the paper's office in December 1874 after R.J. Steele's stepson, Harry Hale Granice, fatally shot Edward Madden, editor of the Merced Tribune. The Argus then went on hiatus from Dec. 5, 1874 to March 5, 1875. Granice wrote a booklet on the shooting while in jail called "Hunted Down; or, Five Days in the Fog." He was founded guilty of first-degree murder and sentenced to life in prison, but the California Supreme Court granted him a new trial. A jury convicted him a second time, but the supreme court reversed the decision and released Granice, who went on to buy the Sonoma Index.

A rival paper was launched on June 17, 1880, called the Merced Star. It was founded by brothers Thomas and Charles Harris. The Steeles launched a daily edition called the Merced Daily Argus on Oct. 4, 1886. Mr. Steele died in January 1890. Mrs. Steele retired in June 1890, leaving their son Lee R. Steele as the sole proprietor and editor. In December 1889, J.O. Blackburn started the Merced Journal. In December 1890, the Steele family sold the Argus to Justus Hubbard Rogers and Charles Daniel Radcliffe. In January 1891, Rogers and Radcliffe acquired the Journal and merged it with the Argus to form the Merced County Sun. Rogers soon sold out to Willard Beebe, who in turn sold out to Radcliffe in 1893. Beebe went on to own the Los Banos Enterprise. Radcliffe's brother Corwin Radcliffe joined the paper in 1895. Star co-owner Thomas Harris died in 1897. Sun co-owner C.D. Radcliffe died in 1919, and Urban J. Hoult then became a partner at the Sun.

In 1921, Charles Harris sold the Star to Walter H. Killam. In 1924, Sun co-owner Hoult died. In 1925, Peter McClung and his two sons Ray and Hugh McClung bought the Merced Evening Sun and Merced Morning Star and merged them together to form the Merced Sun-Star. In 1941, Dean Lesher, publisher of the Fremont Tribune in Nebraska, bought the Sun-Star from the McClung family. During World War II, Lesher faced a financial crisis as local advertising declined. In response, he took 40 prominent shop owners to dinner and asked them to advertise to save the community newspaper. Most of the merchants responded favorably.

Lesher died in 1993. Two years later, Lesher Newspapers, Inc. sold the Sun-Star, Madera Tribune, and several other papers to USMedia Group, Inc., of Crystal City, Missouri. In 2004, the paper was acquired by The McClatchy Company. In July 2024, the newspaper announced it will decrease the number of print editions to three days a week: Wednesdays, Fridays and Sundays.

== Awards ==
In 2010, the newspaper won a Associated Press Managing Editors Association award in the First Amendment category for a series of stories exposing racist emails sent by an Atwater city councilman.

== Weekly newspapers ==
The Merced Sun-Star also publishes other weekly newspapers, including:

- Atwater Signal
- Chowchilla News
- Livingston Chronicle
