= Patrick J. Talamantes =

American businessperson (born c.1966)

Patrick J. Talamantes (born c. 1966) was the President and CEO of the McClatchy Company from May 16, 2012, until January 25, 2017. He was replaced by Craig Forman.

== Early life ==
Talamantes was born c. 1966, and raised in Sebastopol, California, where he attended Analy High School. He received a bachelor's degree from Stanford University and an MBA from the Wharton School of the University of Pennsylvania.

== Career ==
From 1986 to 1995, Talamantes held various positions with Manufacturers Hanover Trust, which in turn became Chemical Bank. From 1995 to 1996, he was treasurer of River City Broadcasting, which became Sinclair Broadcast Group. There, he served as CFO from 2000 to 2001.

Talamantes joined McClatchy as CFO in April 2001. McClatchy publishes 29 newspapers in 14 states, including the Sacramento Bee. In June 2011, Talamantes assumed additional responsibilities for McClatchy's Florida operations. In January 2017, the company announced that Talamantes was being replaced by Craig Forman, a private investor and entrepreneur.

Business positions
Preceded by Gary B. Pruitt	McClatchy CEO; 2012–present	Succeeded by Craig Forman
