= KVQ =

Radio station in Sacramento, California (1922)

KVQ was a short-lived AM radio station in Sacramento, California, which operated from February 2, 1922, until December 20 of the same year. It was initially licensed to J. C. Hobrecht, although a few months after its start ownership was transferred to the Sacramento Bee newspaper. KVQ was Sacramento's first broadcasting station.

== History ==
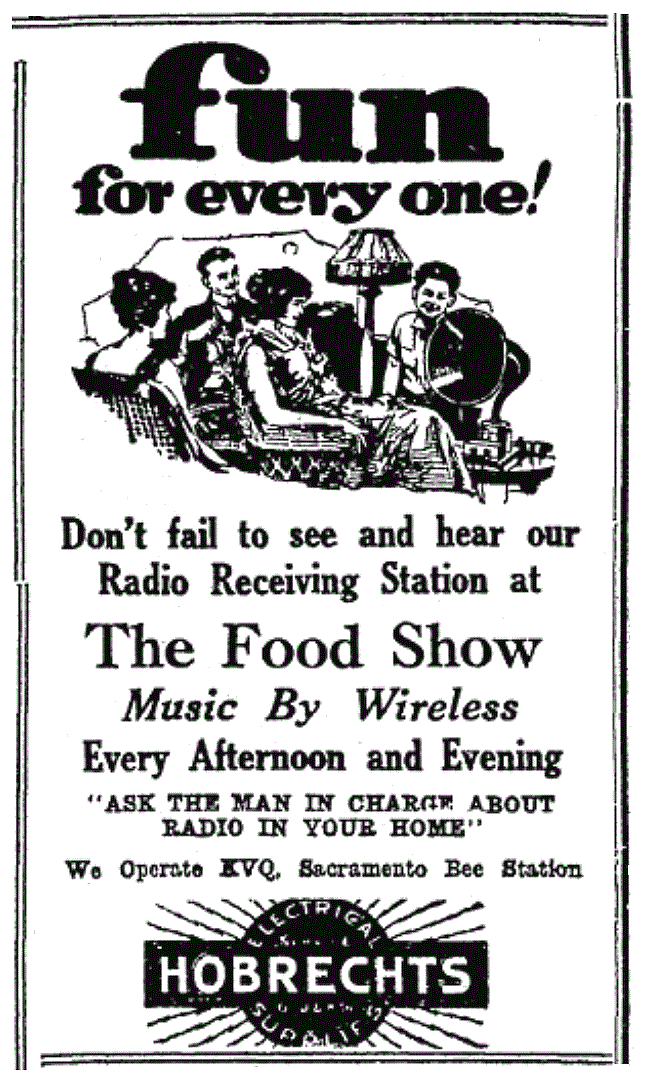
Station advertisement (1922).

KVQ was licensed as Sacramento's first broadcasting station on December 9, 1921, to store owner J. C. Hobrecht. The station's establishment was largely due to the efforts of thirty-year-old Carlos McClatchy, son of the Sacramento Bee's editor and publisher, C. K. McClatchy. Carlos recognized the potential for the then-new idea of radio broadcasting, and convinced the Bee's owners to help finance the new station's operations. An arrangement was made to construct a studio in the newspaper's headquarters at Seventh Street between I and J Streets, with a transmitting antenna atop the building. KVQ made its debut broadcast at 5:30 p.m. on February 2, 1922. The station was primarily used to publicize the Hobrecht store and the Bee, and, as was the common standard at the time, did not accept advertising.

Initially there was only a single wavelength, 360 meters (833 kHz), available for radio station "entertainment" broadcasts, which required stations in various regions to develop timesharing agreements that allocated operating hours. By November 1, 1922, there were seven "Inland Stations" sharing time on 360 meters, with KVQ allocated 6:30 to 7:30 P.M. daily except Sunday, plus 8:00 to 9:00 P.M. Wednesdays, 8:00 to 9:00 P.M. Saturdays, and 6:00 to 7:00 P.M. Sundays.

A few months after the station debuted, ownership was transferred from J. C. Hobrecht to the Bee's publisher, James McClatchy, followed a short time later by a transfer to "Sacramento Bee (James McClatchy Co.)". However, KVQ suspended operations on December 20, 1922, and was formally deleted on January 2, 1923, with the Bee explaining that the station had been shut down in order to "bow to the wishes of Superior California radio fans who sought new fields to conquer and desired the additional quiet hour in the early evening used by the Bee to catch the concerts of stations in far eastern states".

In some accounts KVQ has been credited as being a direct predecessor to station KFBK, which was first licensed as Sacramento's second station on August 16, 1922, and initially operated in conjunction with the Bee's primary newspaper competitor, the Sacramento Union. In 1925 the Bee returned to the broadcasting field after a near three-year absence, joining with KFBK's original owner to convert the station to commercial operations. However, early reviews in the Bee treated KVQ as a separate station from KFBK, and government regulators at the time consistently considered the two to be separate, unrelated stations.

== See also ==
- List of initial AM-band station grants in the United States
