= Wells Fargo Pavilion =

UC Davis Health Pavilion
- Music Circus
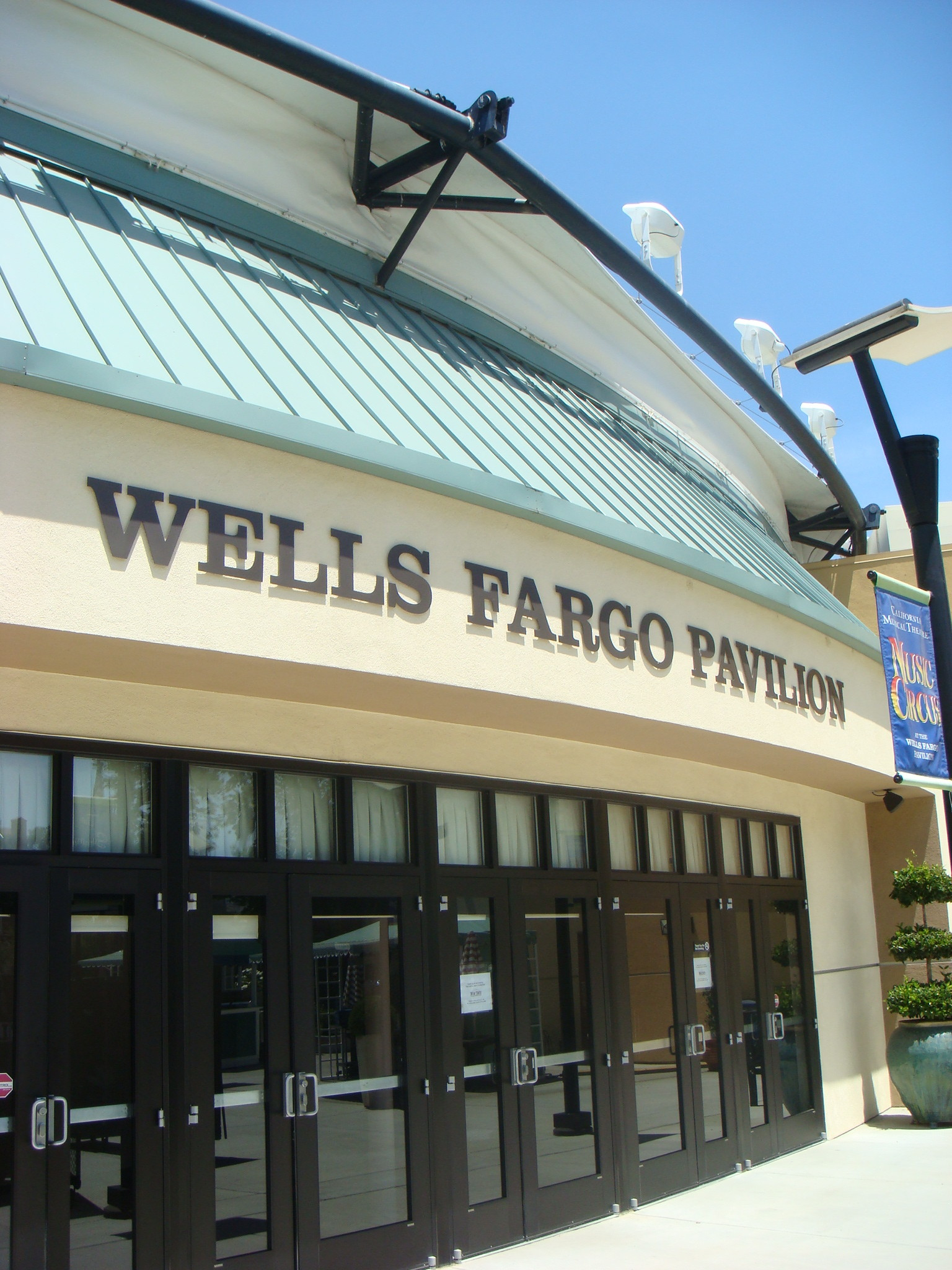
- UC Davis Health Pavilion with the former Wells Fargo Pavilion branding
- Interactive map of UC Davis Health Pavilion
- Former names: The Music Circus Tent (pre-2003), Wells Fargo Pavilion (2003-2021)
- Location: 15 & H St., Sacramento, California
- Owner: Broadway Sacramento & Sacramento Theatre Company
- Seating type: Theatre in the Round
- Capacity: 2,200
- Type: Theatre in the round
- Event: Musical theatre

Construction
- Groundbreaking: 2001
- Opened: Summer 2003

The UC Davis Health Pavilion is a theatre venue, located in Sacramento, California, and owned by Broadway Sacramento and the Sacramento Theatre Company.

== Overview ==
The pavilion is the signature feature of the H Street Theatre Project, which renovated almost the entire block. The stage is a theatre in the round and has a 32-foot (9.8 m) diameter. The theatre seats up to 2,200 guests with a total of 53,000 square feet (4,900 m^{2}). The pavilion is home for the Sacramento Music Circus, a summer-stock theatre.

== History ==
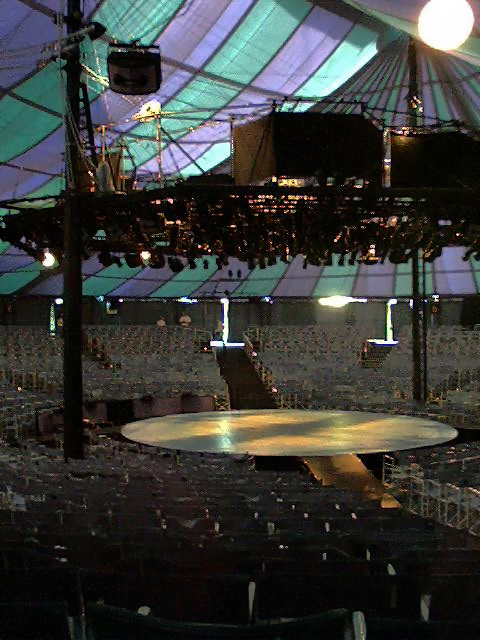
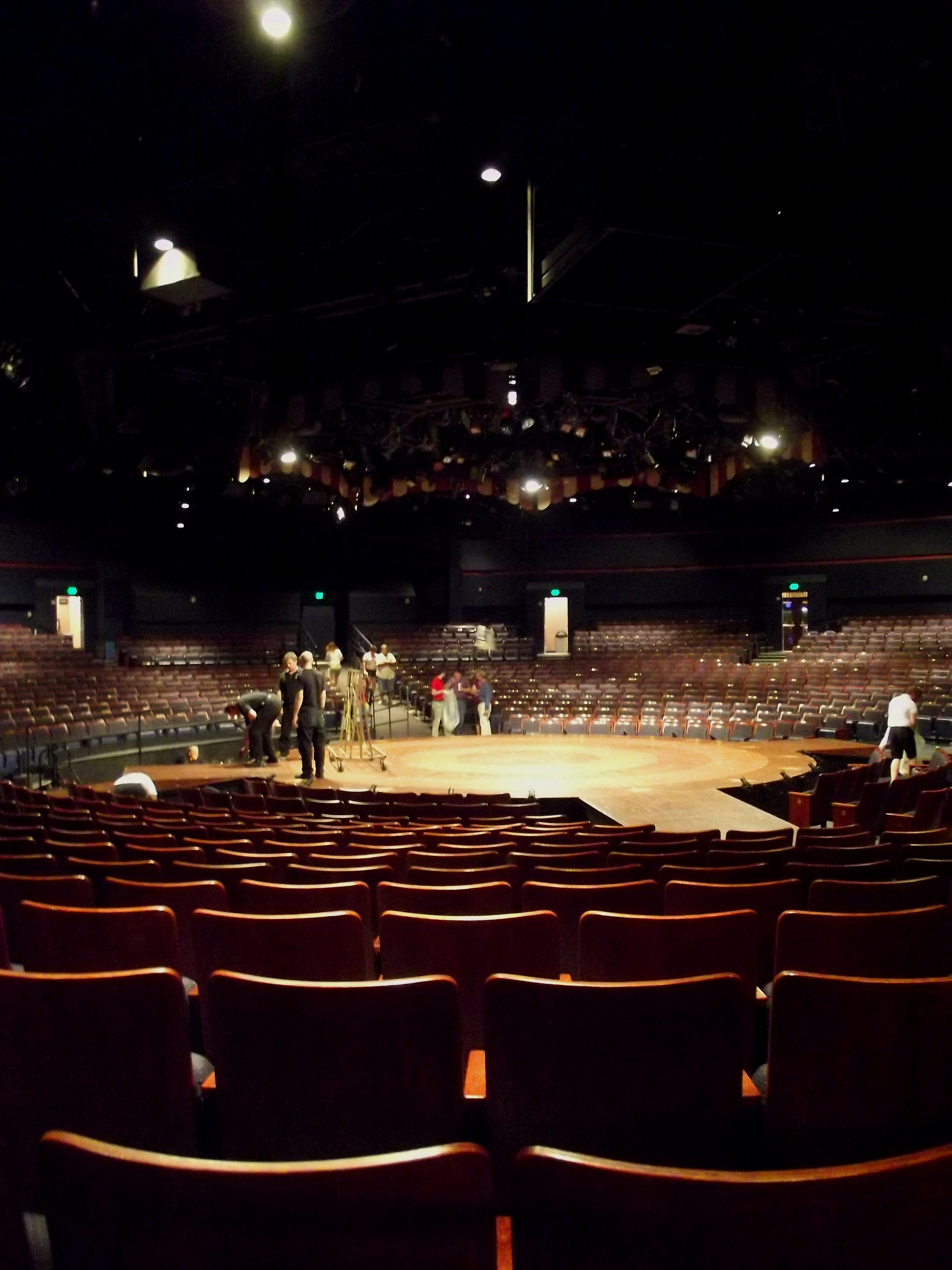
The old Sacramento Music Circus tent in 2001 on the left contrasted by the current Wells Fargo Pavilion in 2011

The site is built on top of the original concrete foundations from the Music Circus tent. Music Circus was a theatre form begun in 1949 by St. John Terrell in Lambertville, New Jersey. Established as summer stock, the new theatre venues primarily housed light operas and operettas, produced in the round, under a circus-style big top. In 2002, Terrell's open-air music circus model ceased to exist as Sacramento Music Circus. It lowered its canvas tent for the last time, returning the following year in this state-of-the-art complex, which offers new technology improvements, such as an expanded lighting grid and a variable-level turntable stage. The original architect is R.F. McCann & Co.

Construction for the new pavilion began in the early 2000s; it opened to the public in the summer of 2003. The structure consists of hard-sided walls with a soft covering, copying its silhouette from the old circus tent. The tent is a permanent structure, covered with Teflon-coated fiberglass fabric but without the tent poles that had previously obstructed the views of the stage.

From its original opening in 2003 until 2022, the venue was known as the Wells Fargo Pavilion. On October 28, 2019, it was briefly announced that Dignity Health would take over sponsorship of the Sacramento theater group and rename the venue as the Dignity Health Theatre. However, on November 10, 2019, Broadway Sacramento and Dignity Health issued a joint statement that the merger would no longer move forward following growing concerns from the LGBTQ community, and the theatre returned to its original name. On May 11, 2022, Broadway Sacramento and UC Davis Health announced a new partnership that included renaming the venue from the Wells Fargo Pavilion to the UC Davis Health Pavilion.
