= Ulysses S. Webb =

California Attorney General from 1902 to 1939

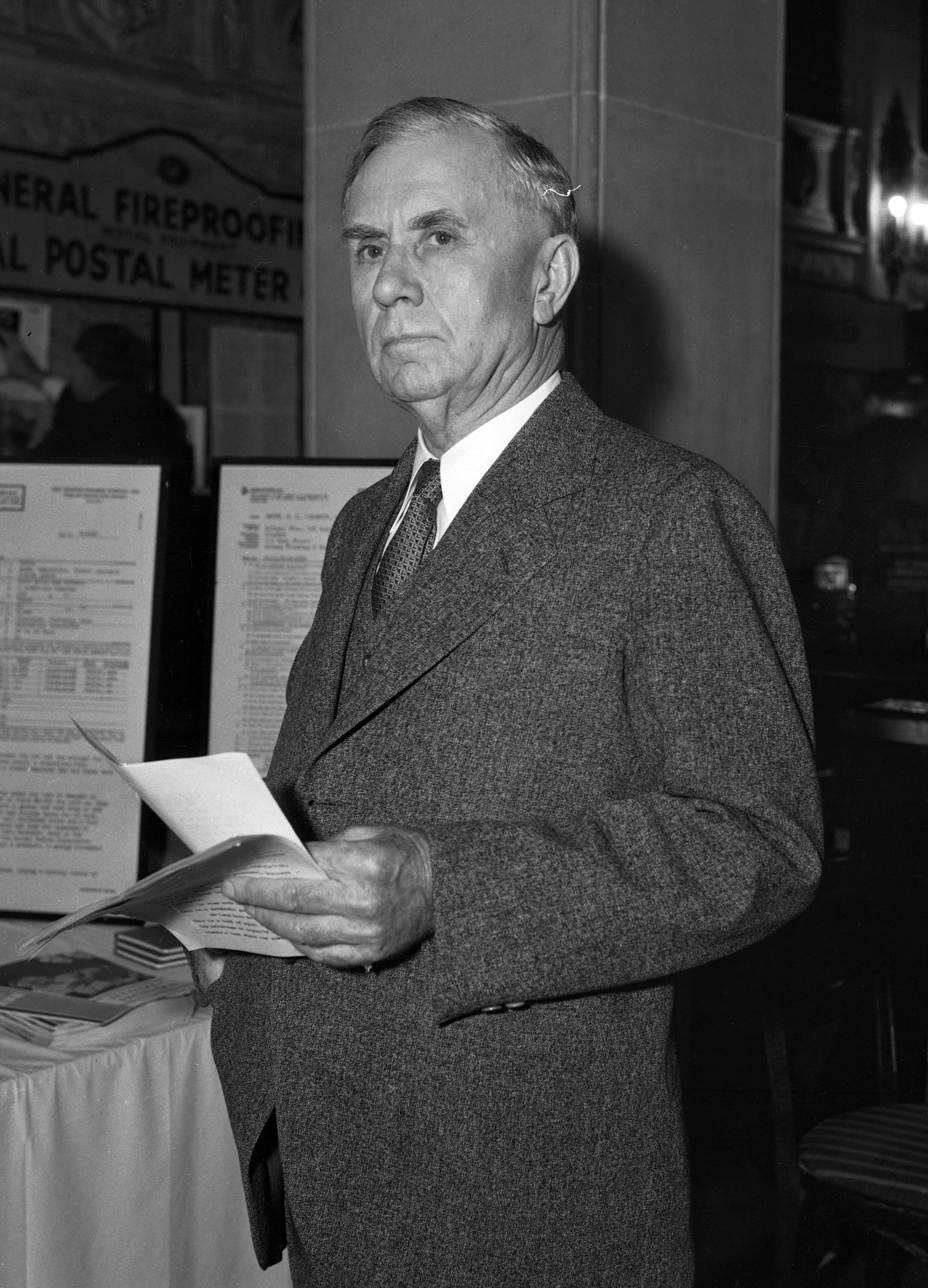
- Webb c. 1934–1939

19th Attorney General of California
- In office September 15, 1902 – January 2, 1939
- Governor: See list: Henry Gage; George Pardee; James Gillett; Hiram Johnson; William Stephens; Friend Richardson; Clement C. Young; James Rolph Jr.; Frank Merriam
- Preceded by: Tirey L. Ford
- Succeeded by: Earl Warren

Personal details
- Born: September 29, 1864 Flemington, West Virginia, U.S.
- Died: July 31, 1947 (aged 82) San Francisco, California, U.S.
- Party: Republican
- Spouse: Grace Goodwin (m. 1895)
- Children: Hester; Sigel Goodwin; Grace

Ulysses Sigel Webb (September 29, 1864 – July 31, 1947) was an American lawyer and politician affiliated with the Republican Party. He served as the 19th Attorney General of California for the lengthy span of 37 years. He was previously the District Attorney of Plumas County from 1890 to 1902. He was the longest serving attorney general in California history.

== Biography ==
Ulysses Sigel Webb was born on September 29, 1864, in Flemington, West Virginia. He was named after Ulysses S. Grant. His father, Cyrus Webb, was a farmer and a captain in the American Civil War. His mother was Eliza (Cather) Webb. Both were from Virginia. Webb had four brothers and two sisters. Webb's ancestors were among the earliest settlers in Virginia.

In 1869 or 1870, Cyrus Webb moved the family to Kansas, where Ulysses was educated. In the spring of 1880, he moved to Quincy, California, in Plumas County. There, in 1889, he gained admittance to the State Bar of California, and was elected Plumas County District Attorney in 1890. He served in that position for 12 years, being reelected in 1892, 1896, and 1900. He resigned in September 1902.

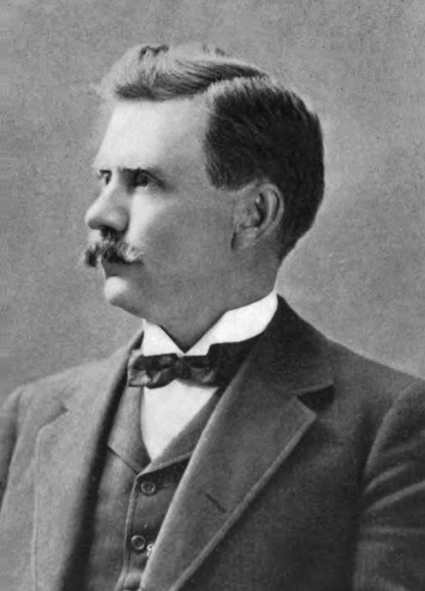
Webb c. 1903

He was appointed Attorney General of California by Governor Henry T. Gage in 1902 to replace the resigning Tirey L. Ford, and was elected to a full term later that year. Webb served as attorney general for 37 years, from 1902 to 1939 (9 terms), and is one of the longest-serving statewide officials in American history. He began a lengthy series of lawsuits to prove the state held title, in trust for the people of California, to tide and submerged lands, for public access and use for navigation, shipping and commerce. His administration served to clarify new legislation involving elections, motor vehicles, and criminal trial procedures. (The Criminal Law Division has since exploded its workload—Webb reported in his 1914–16 Biennial Report a criminal case load of 307 appeals in two years, whereas today more than 6,000 appeals are received annually).

Webb in 1919

Webb drafted the California Alien Land Law of 1913, which was signed by Governor Hiram Johnson. It prohibited ownership and leasing of land in California by those ineligible for citizenship for more than three years. The discriminatory law adversely affected Asian Americans, as they were not eligible for citizenship. It particularly sought to reduce the prominence of Japanese Americans in California's agriculture. Webb vigorously prosecuted land transfers made to avoid enforcement of the law. In the 1930s, Webb's office pressured Fish and Game authorities to go after aliens with commercial fishermen's licenses and prevent offloading of fish at the port of San Diego.

In 1929, the nativist California Joint Immigration Committee (CJIC) lobbied the secretary of labor, James J. Davis, to declare that Mexicans could not become naturalized citizens. Davis accepted the supposed racial inferiority of Mexicans and migration quotas on them, but rejected that they could not be naturalized. He wrote a letter explaining his position to Johnson, who by that point was a senator for the state. In response, the CJIC had Webb, who was a member of the group, wrote a memo to Johnson on the topic criticizing Davis's view. Webb published it in pamphlet form to have it spread to top immigration officials. Fellow CJIC member Valentine S. McClatchy asked the San Francisco naturalization official Paul Armstrong to forward a Mexican naturalization application to Webb as a test case. Armstrong instead sent the case to the United States Naturalization Commissioner, who argued that the matter was already settled.

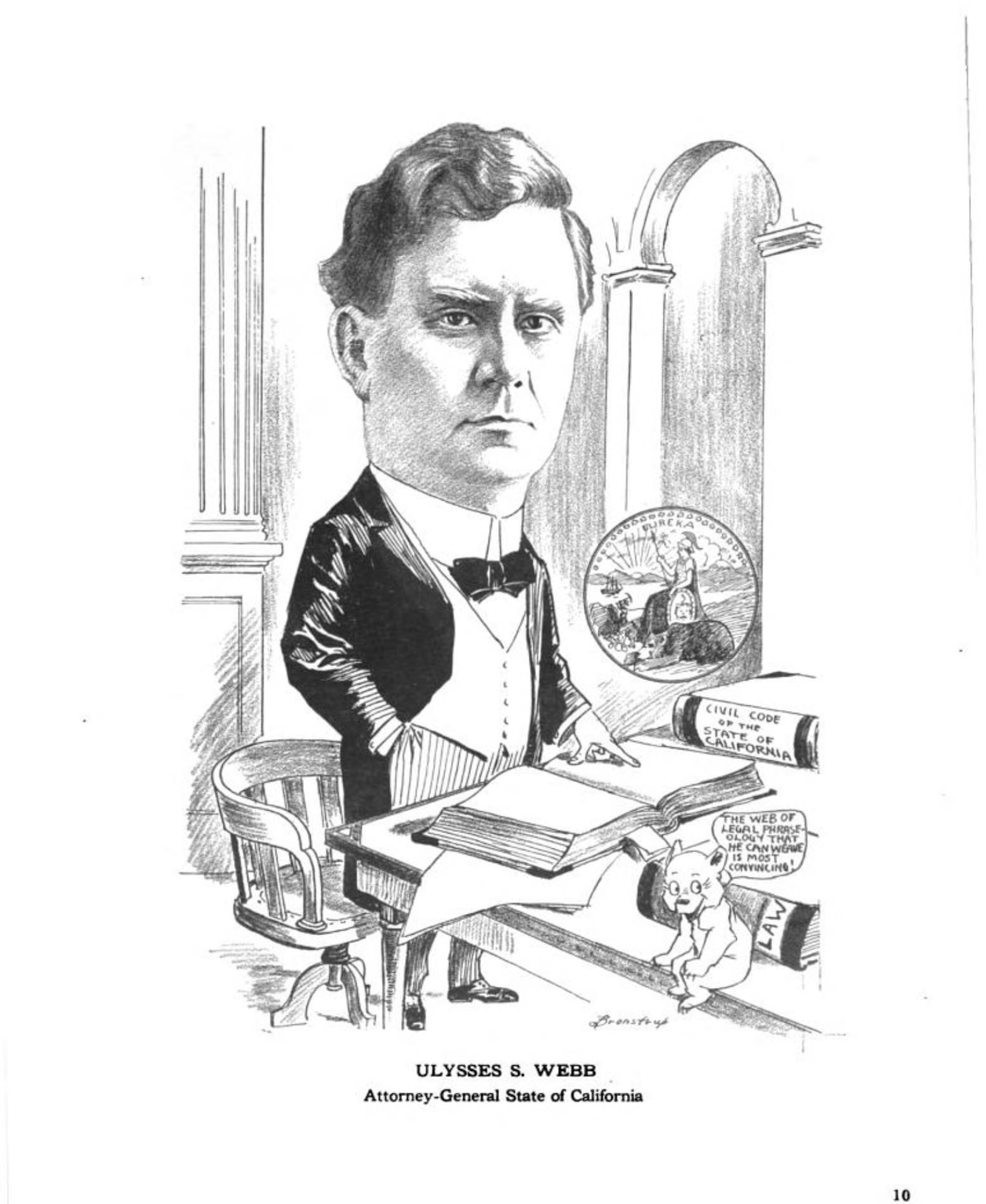
1918 caricature of Webb

On September 18, 1934, Judge C.N. Andrews ruled that residence requirements were a violation of the equal protection clause of the Fourteenth Amendment to the U.S. Constitution. Webb appealed to the Court of Appeals and the state Supreme Court, both of which also ruled that residence requirements violated the Fourteenth Amendment.

In 1891, California's legislature had banned all forms of gambling, including poker. However, in 1911, Webb exempted draw poker from the ban. He argued that it was "a game of science rather than a game of chance".

In 1937, Webb spoke to the state's Republican Party leader, Earl Warren, stating his intention to retire. Webb chose to delay the public announcement to give Warren time to organize his campaign before other candidates. In January 1938, Webb announced his intention to step down after the election in November of that year. One day before the primary election, Webb formally endorsed Warren, citing him as the "logical choice" to succeed him. He was succeeded by Warren on January 2, 1939.

California governor Gray Davis apologized in 2003 for Webb's zealous progressive-promoted sterilization program under the state's eugenics policy.

== Personal life ==
In October 1895, Webb married Grace Goodwin, the daughter of Judge J. D. and Martha Goodwin of Quincy. The Webbs had three children, Hester, Sigel Goodwin and Grace. Webb belonged to the Masonic, Knights of Pythias, and Benevolent and Protective Order of Elks fraternities, and to the Union League Club. He was also a member of the nativist California Joint Immigration Committee. He died in San Francisco on July 31, 1947.

Legal offices
Preceded by Tirey L. Ford	California Attorney General; 1902–1939	Succeeded by Earl Warren
