= Music Circus =

American theatrical form

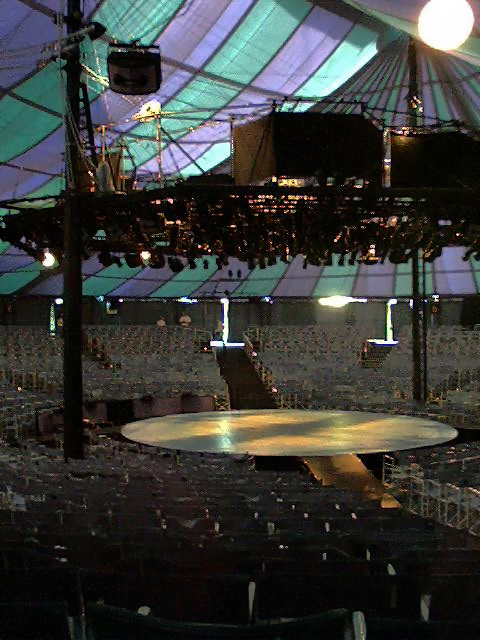
The Sacramento Music Circus stage in 2001

Music circus is an American theatrical form begun in Lambertville, New Jersey, by St. John Terrell in 1949. Established as summer stock, the new theatre venues primarily housed light operas and operettas, produced in the round, under a circus-style big top.

== History ==
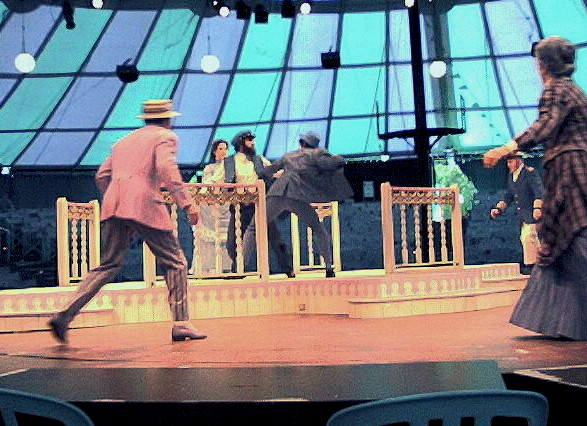
Rehearsal of "Showboat" at Sacramento Music Circus 2001

Actor and adventurer St. John Terrell was born in Chicago, Illinois. He started in show business with a carnival act and later starred on the radio show Jack Armstrong, All American Boy. Referred to as "Sinjun", he served in the Philippines with the USO. When a visiting touring company of an Irving Berlin musical needed performing space, Terrell suggested bulldozing a large pit for a stage in the center and audience on sloping and rising seating all around covered by a tent. This became the genesis to his original New Jersey Music Circus in 1949. Although rejected by the USO, he used his back pay, war bonds and loans after the war, to do it himself. Inspired by Greek amphitheaters, audience members sat in folding chairs no further back than 15 or 16 rows. Although a full orchestra was used, the sets were simple and low to keep sight lines clear. Props were carried on and off by stagehands, in clear view, running up and down aisles. Within 8 years, 30 separate canvas-topped theatres had opened in the US.

St. John Terrell's Music Circus was an instant success, and launched a wide variety of copycats, with 40 "tune tents" scattered around the country, including Cape Cod, Massachusetts; Miami, Florida; and Sacramento, California. While the modern musical theatre genre was being developed on Broadway by the likes of Rodgers & Hammerstein and Lerner & Loewe, the product being produced by most summer stocks remained primarily older works. The first Lambertville season included The Merry Widow, The Desert Song and The Chocolate Soldier, but nothing from the contemporary Broadway canon. As modern musical theatre works became more popular, music circus producers incorporated more of the contemporary works and fewer light operas.

== Other venues ==
Broadway Sacramento's Broadway At Music Circus' 10-show season in 1951 included newer works Brigadoon, Annie Get Your Gun, and the seminal Show Boat. Slowly, the population of music circus theatres around the country diminished, with Terrell's big top folding in 1970. As of 2001, only three theatres of the original design still remained: Broadway At Music Circus (Sacramento, California), South Shore Music Circus (Cohasset, Massachusetts), and the Melody Tent (Hyannis, Massachusetts, on Cape Cod), the latter two venues no longer producing musical theatre, but serving as concert sites. In 2002, Terrell's open air music circus model ceased to exist as Broadway At Music Circus lowered its canvas tent for the last time to make way for a new enclosed theatre-in-the-round—the Wells Fargo Pavilion. As a nod to history, the new arena theatre was still topped by fabric—a Teflon-coated fiberglass fabric manufactured by BirdAir.

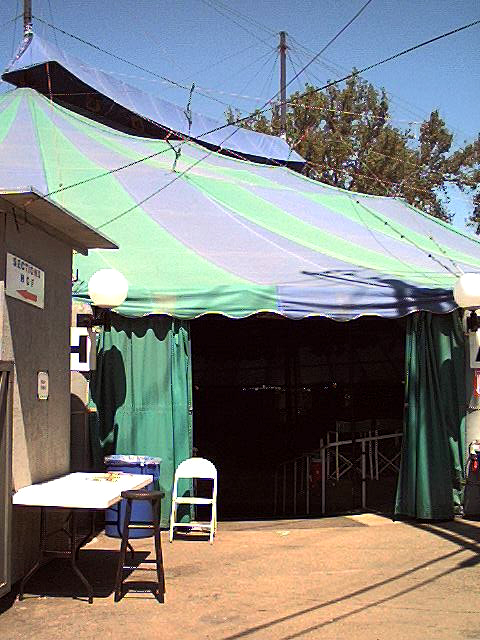
The Sacramento Music Circus Tent in 2001
