= Rowena Granice Steele =

American actress, journalist, author, publisher (1824–1901)

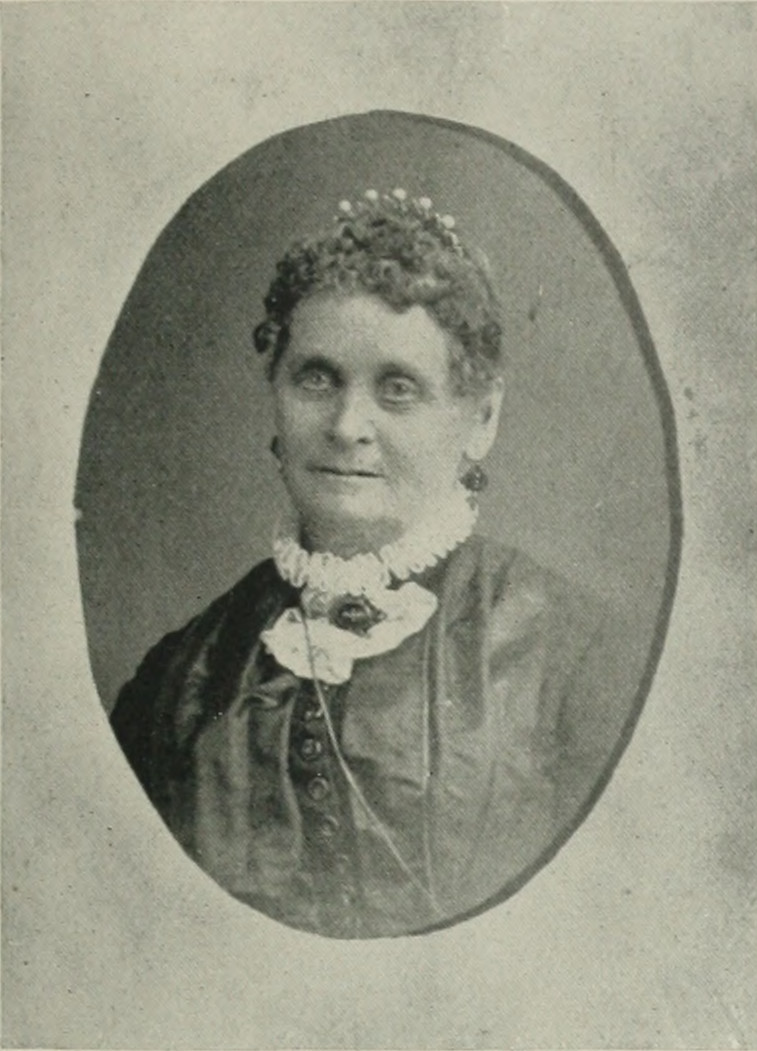
- "A Woman of the Century"
- Born: Rowena Graniss; June 20, 1824; Goshen, New York, U.S.
- Died: February 7, 1901 (aged 76); Willows, California, U.S.
- Resting place: Merced Cemetery, Merced, California, U.S.
- Occupations: Actress; singer; elocutionist; journalist; poet; novelist; editor; publisher
- Spouse: Thomas Claughley (m. 1846; died 1860) Robert J. Steele (m. 1861; died 1889)
- Children: Henry Hale Granice, George Law Granice, Lee Richmond Steele
- Writing career
- Language: English
- Genre: low comedy
- Notable work: The Victims of Fate

Rowena Granice Steele (née Graniss; after first marriage, Claughley; after second marriage, Steele; June 20, 1824 – February 7, 1901) was an American performer (actress, singer, elocutionist), author of poetry and novels, as well as a newspaper journalist, editor, and publisher. The first novel written by a woman in California was Steele's, The Victims of Fate, a work of fiction loosely based on David C. Broderick, the preface stating: "Some of the incidents of this little story, (although mingled with fiction,) are real facts. I had the honor of being acquainted with the hero, from my earliest childhood. First, as a lad of little promise, although to use a quaint expression, King-Bee among his boy companions. After, as a young, terprising aspirant for political fame. Last, as the finished gentleman and a nation's pride." Steele was well known for the entertainment she provided during the early days of the California Gold Rush, where, with her son, George, she acted out scenes from Shakespeare and bits of comedy. Steele died in 1901.

== Early life ==
Rowena Granniss was born in Goshen, New York, on June 20, 1824. Her parents were Harry and Julie Granniss. Her siblings were: Rodney Grannis (1813–1813), Mary Emily Grannis (1814–1878), John V Granniss (1815–1898), Mary Grannis (1816–1870), Harriet E Grannis (1819–1901), Joel M Grannis (1820–1856), Horace Rosive Grannis (1821–1889), John Chandler Grannis (1824–1881), Reliance Roxanna Grannis (1827–1829), Frances A. Granniss (1827–1902), Henry Martyn Grannis (1830–1874), Charles Norbert Grannis (1848–1868), and Luella Grannis (1850–1918).

At an early age, she showed a talent for composition, but, being of an extremely sensitive nature, her efforts were burned as soon as written.

== Career ==
=== Performer and theater manager ===
In 1846, she married Thomas Neptune Claughley (1818–1860). While he abandoned the family in 1853 to pursue the California Gold Rush, she performed in Barnum's American Museum in New York City. In 1856, she and the couple's two sons, Henry and George, were removed to California in search of Thomas. After finding him and discovering him to be a "bum", she gave up his surname. In April of that year, she was a performer of Shakesperian readings, songs, dances, and Yankee stories at San Francisco's Metropolitan Theater using the stage name "Miss Rowena Granice". In September, with Dan Virgil Gates, she was performing a similar program in Petaluma, California. The following month, the Trinity Times gave her performance in Trinity County, California, a poor review: "A certain Rowena Granice sang hideously. She has no voice, or rather the voice of a diseased crow. Rowena cannot dance, unless bears dance." In 1857, Granice became the lessee and manager of the Sacramento Theater. In the year and the following, she performed in various Northern California venues including the National Theater of Sacramento in Oroville, the Southern Mines (gold mines below the Mokelumne River), and Folsom, as well as in the Sandwich Islands.

Though she and Mr. Claughley were not divorced, she married John P. ("Yankee") Addams (d. 1885) on 5 March 1858, in Sacramento. Though he was a one-time leader of a large Mormon colony, when she met him, Addams was an actor, manager, dramatist, comedian, and ultimately "a hopeless rover". Granice and Addams formed a traveling theater company, along with Myers and Gale.

In May 1859, Steele opened a saloon, "The Gaieties, Temple of Mirth and Song" on Commercial Street in San Francisco where she performed burlesque. Lotta Crabtree, Granice's protege and Louise Paullin were members of Granice's company at The Gaieties. In August, Mr. Claughley closed and nailed up the theater. The next morning, Granice re-opened it. Claughley closed it a second time, and Granice opened it a second time. Each complained of the other and they were both arrested. The business closed for a while that year, during which time she performed at a Sacramento, California theater. In November of that year, while she was the proprietor of the Union Theater in San Francisco, she was arraigned in the San Francisco Police Court for assault and battery on a theater goer, but when the complaint was called, Grance was discharged on the consent of the complainant. The Gaieties had reopened by January 1860, when there was news of an altercation which involved Mr. Claughley and others. In 1866, she was traveling in San Joaquin County, giving readings and comic songs; and in July 1868, she was in Tuolumne City with her son, George, performing scenes from Macbeth and Othello as well as skits she had penned, including Judy Murflinnigan's trip from Ould Ireland and The Maniac. In 1871, while residing in Snelling, she was the head of a local amateur dramatic association.

=== Author and publisher ===
Through the force of circumstances, she was compelled to offer her stories and sketches to the newspapers and magazines, and in less than two years, the name of Rowena Granice had become a household word in every town in the new State of California. The newspapers praised the simple home stories of the new California writer. The taste for sensational stories among the early miners, in harmony with their own feverish life, was indicated by the favor accorded to the contributions of Steele, then writing as Rowena Granice, to The Golden Era, so much so as to prompt the reissue of several stories.

The first novel written by a woman in California, so far as known, was Steele's, The Victims of Fate. Appearing in 1857, it was published by Sterrett & Co. One thousand copies were sold in San Francisco and five thousand throughout the State. She published The Family Gem in 1858, a collection of her short stories.

On June 13, 1861, at Salmon Falls, California, she married Robert Johnson Steele. In April 1862, while living in Auburn, California, she published a novelette, The Suicide's Curse. In July, Granice and her new husband started the Pioneer newspaper in Snelling, California. They soon removed to Merced, California, where the paper was enlarged. The San Joaquin Valley Argus was published every Saturday morning in Merced. The San Joaquin Valley Argus described itself as "the only Independent, Reform paper in Merced county, advocating Temperance and general Reform, socially, morally and politically. This paper was the first newspaper ever published in Merced county, being started at Snelling, the county seat, on July 3d, 1862, with Mr. R. J. Steele as proprietor and editor, and Mrs. R. G. Steele as assistant editor. It is bold and fearless in advocating right and truth. It is permanently established, has a large circulation in three counties, is well known, and consequently one of the best advertising mediums in the San Joaquin Valley." This also included the Republican Weekly of which Mr. and Mrs. Steele were its editors, while Mrs. Steele was the publisher and proprietor.

In 1874, she authored Dell Dart, or, Within the meshes. She continued to act as associate editor of the couple's newspaper until 1877, when the failing health of her husband compelled her to take entire charge, and for seven years, she was editor and proprietor. In 1884, assisted by her son, she started a daily, in connection with the weekly. In 1890, her husband died. After conducting successfully the newspaper business in the same county for twenty-eight years, she sold out. In 1892, she was editor and proprietor of the Budget, in Lodi, California.

Steele was an active writer and worker for the temperance cause. She was also an advocate of woman suffrage, both as a speaker and writer.

== Personal life ==
Steele had three sons, Henry Hale Granice (unknown–1915), George Law Granice (1853–1877), and Lee Richmond Steele (1862–1925). Henry and Lee both became journalists. In 1874, She died February 7, 1901, in Merced, after an illness of several weeks from a general breaking down of the system;. She had been failing for several years and rapidly in the last few months. She was buried at the Merced Cemetery.

Steele's life and collected works are the subject of a series of works titled ROWENA--The Life and Collected Works of Rowena Granice Steele-California Pioneer/Actress/Author/Newspaper Publisher (PSS Publications, 2024), by Priscilla Stone Sharp. Volume I is the Biography; Volume II contains her recovered works from 1857 to 1873; Volume III covers the years 1874-1893.

== Selected works ==
- 1857, Victims of Fate
- 1858, The Family Gem
- 1861, Camorie, or the Kanaka Girl's Revenge (novelette)
- 1862, Leonnie St. James, or the Suicide's Curse
- 1862, The Suicide's Curse (novelette)
- 1874, Dell Dart, or, Within the meshes
- 1893, Weak or wicked? : a romance
