= California Joint Immigration Committee =

20th-century racist anti-immigration organization in the U.S.

- Predecessor: Japanese Exclusion League
- Formation: 1924
- Founder: Valentine S. McClatchy
- Purpose: To maintain the exclusion of Japanese immigrants to the United States

The California Joint Immigration Committee (CJIC) was a nativist lobbying organization active in the early to mid-twentieth century that advocated exclusion of Asian and Mexican immigrants to the United States.

== Background ==
The CJIC was a successor organization to the Japanese Exclusion League, which was itself a successor to the Asiatic Exclusion League (AEL), originally known as the Japanese and Korean Exclusion League.

Significant anti-Asian prejudice in the United States manifested first against Chinese laborers during the construction of the transcontinental railroad in the 1860s. By barring Chinese laborers, the Chinese Exclusion Act of 1882 in effect excluded most Chinese immigrants to the United States. Shortly after the turn of the century, rising numbers of Japanese immigrants led to anti-Japanese agitation and anti-Japanese sentiment on the West Coast. In order to quell the unrest, a diplomatic compromise known as the Gentleman's Agreement was worked out between the United States and Japan. The agreement held that the United States would not restrict immigration from Japan, while Japan was not to allow further emigration to the United States.

The Japanese and Korean Exclusion League was formed in San Francisco, California in May 1905, two months after the California State Legislature passed a unanimous resolution requesting that Congress “limit and diminish the further immigration of Japanese.” The resolution passed within a week after the San Francisco Chronicle began printing a series of anti-Japanese articles. The league was dedicated to excluding Japanese people from the United States and was funded mostly by the California Building and Construction Trades Council, a prominent labor union. In December 1907, it was renamed the Asiatic Exclusion League, which was then reorganized as the Japanese Exclusion League (JEL) in September 1920.

The Japanese Exclusion League was a pressure group representing the interests of nativists, veteran's organizations, women's clubs, labor unions, and farmers. Its operations were led and largely financed by its volunteer special representative Valentine S. McClatchy, a former newspaper publisher. McClatchy and his friend Hiram Johnson, the senior U.S. senator for California, were the leading figures in the effort to block Japanese immigration to the United States, which was realized with the passage of the Immigration Act of 1924. McClatchy, accompanied by California Attorney General Ulysses S. Webb and former U.S. Senator James D. Phelan, testified before the Senate Committee on Immigration prior to the passage of the act. His testimony included the following remarks:

“Japanese are less assimilable and more dangerous as residents in this country than any other of the peoples ineligible under our laws…They do not come here with any desire or any intent to lose their racial or national identity…They never cease being Japanese…In pursuit of their intent to colonize this country with that race they seek to secure land and to found large families…They have greater energy, greater determination, and greater ambition than the other yellow and brown races ineligible to citizenship, and with the same low standards of living, hours of labor, use of women and child labor, they naturally make more dangerous competitors in an economic way.”

== Founding ==
After the passage of the 1924 Immigration Act, McClatchy took formal leadership of the Japanese Exclusion League, which was reorganized and renamed the California Joint Immigration Committee, in part because of “the prejudice which the name of the [earlier] organization created." McClatchy regarded the new law as an insufficient means to combat the pro-Japanese “organized propaganda” directed by church activities. He thus formed the CJIC as an authorized and representative committee with an executive force and permanent office. The general aim of the CJIC at this early stage was to gain broad support for the maintenance of the new law, which did not allow for a quota of immigrants from Japan.

== Supporting organizations ==
As Executive Secretary of the CJIC, McClatchy led a coordinating body composed of seven members. These included the executive officers of the following organizations, all of which shared an interest in maintaining Japanese exclusion from the United States.

=== The American Legion ===
The California department of this military veterans organization was concerned by potential Japanese aggression and had maintained an anti-Japanese position since its founding. Legion Adjutant James K. Fisk was Chairman of the CJIC.

=== Native Sons of the Golden West (NSGW) ===
NSGW was a brotherhood founded in 1876 whose membership was limited to those born in California. The organization was chiefly concerned with issues of nativism rather than the economic effects of Japanese immigration. John T. Regan of the NSGW was a Principal Member of the CJIC.

=== The California State Federation of Labor ===
The unskilled members of this 9,000-strong labor union were particularly opposed to Japanese immigrants, whom they believed undercut wages. Paul Scharrenberg, secretary of the union from 1909 to 1936, was a Principal Member of the CJIC.

=== The California State Grange ===
Representing farmers who ran small-scale operations, this organization opposed Japanese immigration due to the competition that Japanese farmers introduced to the state.

== Opponents ==
Opposition to Japanese exclusion was strongest on the East Coast. The groups against exclusion and the CJIC's activities consisted of various national and regional clergy associations, businessmen, institutes of higher education, and peace activists. The most prominent of these were as follows.

=== The National Committee on American Japanese Relations (NCAJR) ===
Led by former U.S. Attorney General George W. Wickersham, NCAJR was founded in 1921 by Sidney L. Gulick, an educator who spent twenty-five years as a missionary in Japan before returning to the United States. Once the Immigration Act of 1924 had been passed, NCAJR distributed pamphlets written by Gulick and fellow missionary William Axling. Gulick argued that excluding Japanese immigrants was damaging relations with Japan and that the only way to address the problem was to institute a quota. One line of attack used by the CJIC against NCAJR was that advocates for modification of the law were beholden to Japan on account of their past work and were therefore concerned more for the well-being of Japan rather than the United States.

=== Federal Council of the Churches of Christ in America (FCCCA) ===
This ecumenical association of Protestant denominations publicly opposed the exclusion of Japanese immigrants and called for the immigration law to be changed so as to provide Japan with a quota. It was primarily concerned with the effect Japanese exclusion had on international relations. According to McClatchy, Gulick “converted” the leaders of the FCCCA to his point of view and, as leader of the organization's Oriental Department, pushed anti-exclusion as an established church policy.

=== The San Francisco Chamber of Commerce ===
From the late 1920s to the late 1930s, businessmen on the West Coast who traded with Japan sought to modify the exclusion clause so as to permit Japan an immigration quota. Their efforts were coordinated by the San Francisco Chamber of Commerce, which was mainly led by Wallace M. Alexander. Alexander was a businessman and trustee of the Carnegie Endowment for International Peace.

== Operations ==
The purposes of the CJIC were: 1) to keep advised as to propaganda and efforts directed against the national policy of restrictive immigration; 2) to be prepared with data and literature to meet argument and attack; 3) to actively oppose anti-exclusion movements through distribution of literature and presentation of the facts by speakers.

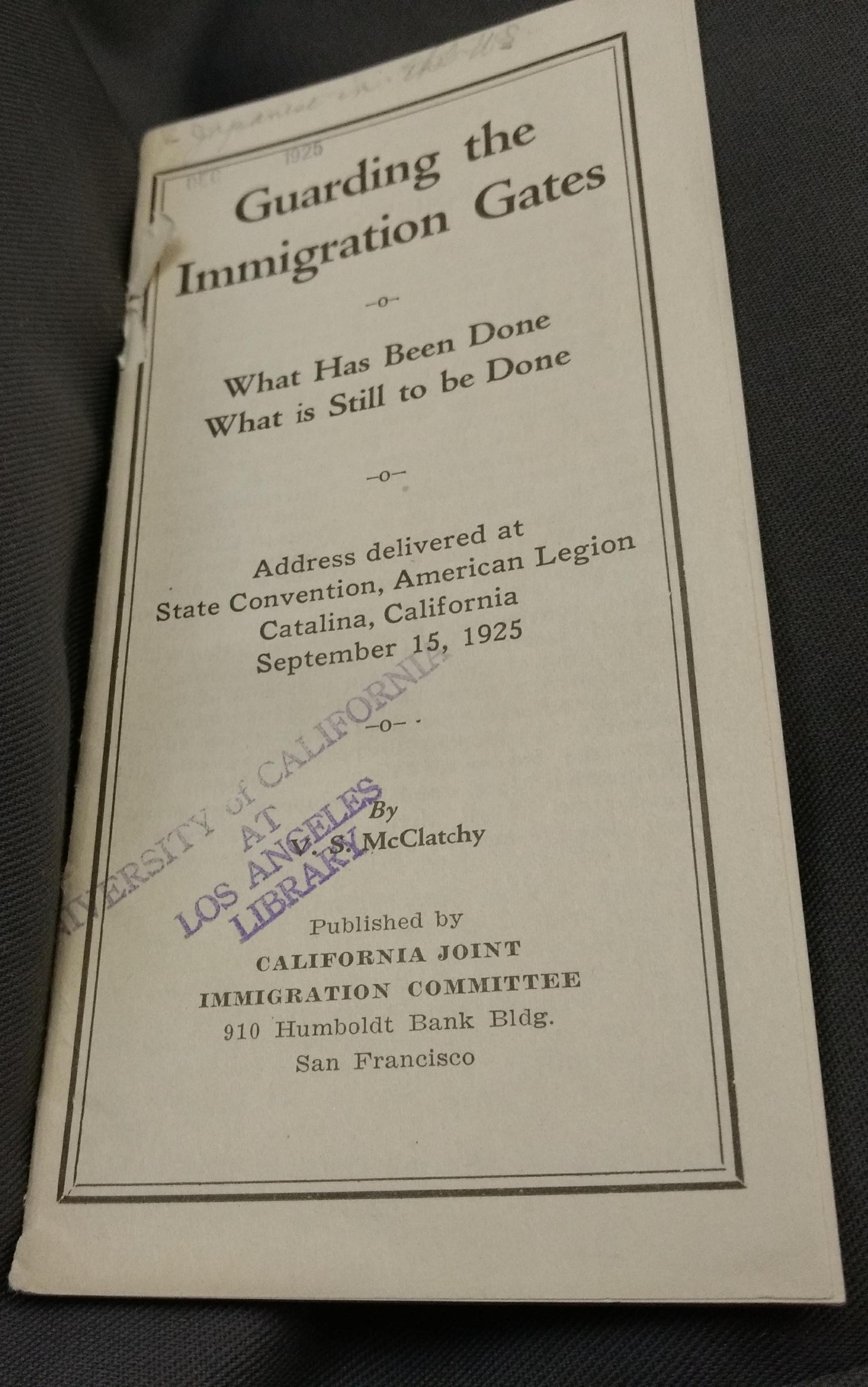
A 1925 pamphlet written by V.S. McClatchy, the Executive Secretary of the California Joint Immigration Committee (CJIC). The pamphlet expresses McClatchy's views on the necessity to maintain the exclusion of Japanese immigrants to the United States.

To these ends, the CJIC kept in touch with the expressed sentiments of the Japanese, prepared and issued leaflets, and sought to “remove cause for difference of opinion among Americans and restore better feeling on the part of the Japanese."

=== Japanese exclusion ===
Support for Japanese exclusion was generally divided on the West Coast around the time when the CJIC was founded. A 1924 study conducted by the Japanese Foreign Office found that of nineteen California newspapers, ten were anti-Japanese and five were pro-Japanese, with the rest holding a neutral stance.

==== 1925–1929 ====
Throughout the second half of the 1920s, the CJIC and the most prominent members of the anti-exclusion movement fought over the righteousness of their causes. In a special issue of the English-language newspaper The Japan Times and Mail published five months after the passage of the immigration act, prominent Japanese citizens expressed their dissatisfaction with the exclusion clause. In response, the CJIC issued a pamphlet in which McClatchy argued that the Gentleman's Agreement had been “inefficient” and that the exclusion clause of the 1924 act was not due to racial prejudice.

In December 1925, the executive committee of the FCCCA promulgated its new position on Japanese exclusion. Rather than continue to pursue a political solution, the FCCCA would work to educate the public and gain influential supporters throughout the country. The CJIC did not regard this as a retreat and so maintained its attacks against the FCCCA throughout 1926.

In early 1927, the scope of the CJIC's activities expanded to include opposition to immigration from Mexico and The Philippines. This was accompanied by a relative reduction in interest in Japanese exclusion. Within one year, the CJIC was primarily targeting Mexicans and Filipinos. McClatchy still maintained an interest in Japanese exclusion, as when he spoke out against an immigration quota for Japan while testifying to the House Immigration Committee in June of that year.

In September 1928, the California State Grange withdrew from the CJIC. Late that year, the pro-quota movements were gaining momentum, with McClatchy admitting that his opponents were “steadily gaining a psychological advantage.” In February of the following year, the CJIC resumed its attacks on pro-quota movements, beginning with a letter-writing campaign to California legislators.

==== 1930–1934 ====
With the onset of the Great Depression, business interests on the West Coast created their own pro-quota movement in hopes of stimulating more trade with Japan. Throughout 1930 and 1931, pro-quota movements continued to gain momentum, with several cities passing pro-quota resolutions. In July 1931, the Immigration Committee of the U.S. Chamber of Commerce passed its own pro-quota resolution. McClatchy protested by publishing another anti-quota pamphlet composed as an open letter to the San Francisco Chamber of Commerce leader Wallace M. Alexander.

After Japan invaded Manchuria in late 1931, McClatchy used the incident to argue that similar underhandedness would be employed by Japan against the United States in order to modify the immigration law.

In mid-1933, pro-quota strength increased with the new support of Roy Howard of the Scripps-Howard newspaper chain. McClatchy responded by seeking the support of newspaper magnate William Randolph Hearst. The result was a conflict between the pro-quota Scripps-Howard newspapers and the anti-quota Hearst papers.

In March 1934, a CJIC release raised the threat of “a flood of immigrants from all the colored races of Asia.”

==== 1935–1945 ====
In February 1935, McClatchy published CJIC releases that claimed the Japanese government was distributing pro-Japanese textbooks in American public schools, particularly in Hawaii. No evidence was found to support this claim.

After the Marco Polo Bridge Incident of July 1937 and ensuing breakout of full-scale war between Japan and China, American public opinion of Japan dropped sharply.

On May 15, 1938, McClatchy died of a heart attack at the age of eighty. He was succeeded as Executive Secretary of the CJIC by his son Harold Jedd. The CJIC continued to publicize the danger posed by Japan to Hawaii, issuing a release in October 1938 that warned of the “Japanese Threat to Dominate Hawaii.”

The Japanese attack on Pearl Harbor on December 7, 1941, ended any hope for establishing an immigration quota for Japan. The CJIC subsequently supported the mass removal of Japanese Americans from the Pacific Coast.

=== Mexican exclusion ===
The Treaty of Guadalupe Hidalgo made U.S. citizenship available to Mexicans residing in the lands won by the U.S. in the Mexican-American War. The treaty did not comment on the racial status of Mexicans. The right of Mexicans to obtain citizenship was confirmed in 1897 by a federal judge in Texas who ruled on the case In re Rodriguez. The Immigration Act of 1924 closed off immigration from the Eastern Hemisphere, but did not contain restrictive quotas for nations in the Western Hemisphere.

Starting in the late 1920s, the CJIC advocated the exclusion of Mexican immigrants on the basis that they were not white or black and therefore could not become citizens under the Naturalization Act of 1790, revised in 1870. McClatchy and California Attorney General Ulysses S. Webb testified before Congress in 1929. According to McClatchy, Mexican Indians were “of the Mongolian or Mongoloid race” and were therefore ineligible for American citizenship. The CJIC followed the message up in October of that year with a press release bearing the headline “Mexican Indians Not Eligible for American Citizenship.”

The CJIC's strategy to achieve Mexican exclusion was to find a suitable test case for a federal court, a favorable ruling from which would overturn the precedents that had theretofore permitted Mexicans to immigrate to the U.S. and naturalize. McClatchy searched the nation for a suitable naturalization judge to whom the opportunity could be presented. In doing so, McClatchy colluded with John Murff, a naturalization examiner, and John Knight of the U.S. District Court in Buffalo. The case in question was In Re Andrade (1936). The petitioner Timoteo Andrade was a citizen of Mexico who had been residing in the U.S. for twenty years when he filed his naturalization petition. The case was ultimately decided in Andrade's favor, marking a significant setback to Mexican exclusion.

== See also ==
- History of immigration to the United States
- Anti-Japanese sentiment
- Asiatic Exclusion League
- Valentine S. McClatchy
