= Frank Coonelly =

American sports executive

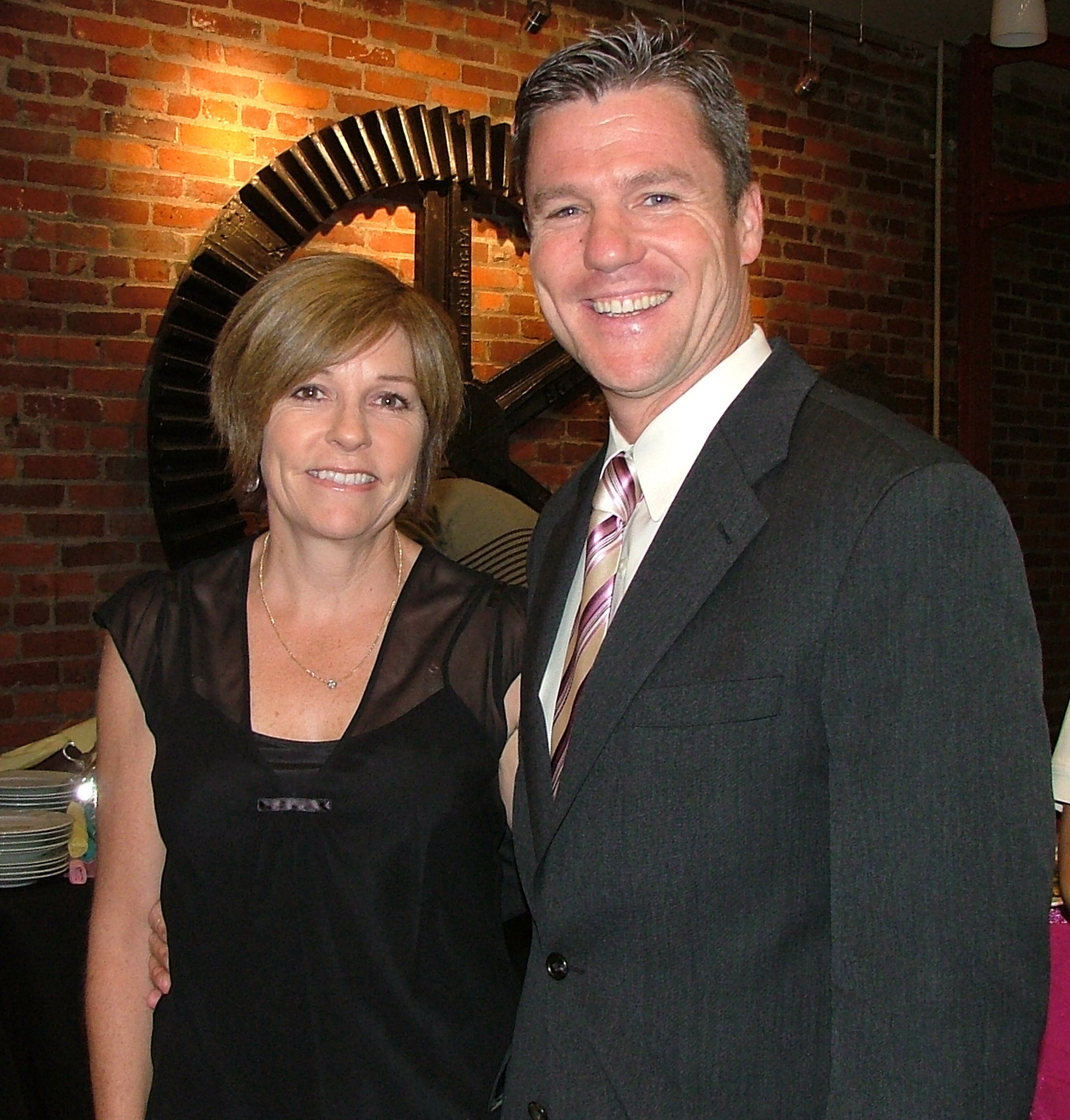
- Born: March 31, 1960 (age 66); Philadelphia, Pennsylvania, U.S.
- Education: Pennsylvania State University; Catholic University of America (JD)
- Occupation: Sports Executive
- Spouse: Debbie
- Children: 4

Francis X. "Frank" Coonelly (born March 31, 1960) is an American sports executive. He is the former president of the Pittsburgh Pirates (2007–2019). His hiring was announced by the Pirates on September 13, 2007. He replaced Kevin McClatchy who purchased the Pirates with a group of investors in 1996 and was the CEO for the next 12 seasons. Prior to the start of the 2007 season Bob Nutting had taken over as principal owner of the Pirates but said he was comfortable with McClatchy as the CEO. Midway through the season McClatchy announced his intention to resign and the Pirates began a search for a replacement. Coonelly's first major assignment was to hire a new general manager to replace Dave Littlefield, who was fired days before Coonelly was hired. On September 25, 2007, he announced that he had chosen Neal Huntington from the Cleveland Indians organization. He left as president of the team in October 2019.

Coonelly was a senior vice president in the Commissioner's Office, where he was in charge of various matters including arbitration hearings and draft bonuses. Prior to that he had worked as a lawyer in private practice. He was born and raised in Philadelphia. He earned a bachelor's degree from Penn State University and a J.D. degree from Catholic University. He and his wife, Debbie, have four children.

Coonelly was arrested for drunk driving in 2012.

Preceded by Kevin McClatchy	President of the Pittsburgh Pirates; 2007-2019	Succeeded by Travis Williams
