= Erwin Potts =

American businessman

Erwin Potts (April 20, 1932 – May 18, 2017) was the first non-McClatchy family member CEO of the McClatchy Company from 1989 to 1996.

== Early life ==
Potts was born in Pineville, North Carolina, attended Mars Hill College and is a graduate of the University of North Carolina.

== Career ==
Between 1958 and 1970, he was a reporter, city editor and assistant manager at the Miami Herald. He was the general manager of the Tallahassee Democrat, The Charlotte Observer and The Charlotte News.

In 1989, he became president of McClatchy and in 1996, became CEO. He was chairman when he retired in 2001.

== Death ==
Potts died due to complications from an accident sustained at his home in Cabo San Lucas, Mexico, on May 18, 2017.

Business positions
Preceded by Charles K. McClatchy	McClatchy CEO; 1989–1996	Succeeded by Gary B. Pruitt
