= James McClatchy =

American newspaper editor

- Born: June 30, 1824 near Lisburn, County Antrim, Ireland
- Died: October 1883 (aged 59)
- Occupation: Newspaper editor
- Children: 4, including Charles Kenny McClatchy
- Relatives: Eleanor McClatchy {granddaughter); C. K. McClatchy II (grandson); James B. McClatchy (great-grandson)

James McClatchy (June 30, 1824 – October 1883) was an Irish-born American newspaper editor. He was the second editor of The Sacramento Bee, which grew into The McClatchy Company, taking over just days after the newspaper began publication in February 1857, then known as The Daily Bee.

Born in 1824 near Lisburn, County Antrim, Ireland, McClatchy moved to the United States as a teen, after his father's death. He was a journalist on the editorial staff of Horace Greeley’s New York Tribune in 1848 and went to California where he took a position in the summer of 1849 with the Placer Times, which was published at Sutter's Fort.

The next year he went to work for the Sacramento Transcript, the Democratic State Journal and the Sacramento Times before joining founder Rollin Ridge at the fledgling Sacramento Bee. Less than a week after the new paper appeared in 1857, McClatchy had become its editor.

He married widow Charlotte Maria McCormick Feeney in 1856, and had at least four children, including Charles Kenny McClatchy. McClatchy died in 1883, at age 59.

Business positions
Preceded by Company founded	McClatchy President; 1857–1883	Succeeded by Charles Kenny McClatchy
