= Tim Ocel =

American theater director

Tim Ocel, born 1955 or 1956 (age 69–70), is an American theatre and opera director based in St. Louis, Missouri. He has directed productions for such organizations as Opera Theatre of Saint Louis, Shakespeare Santa Cruz, Geva Theatre in Rochester, New York, and the Georgia Shakespeare Festival. He has been artistic director of the Sacramento Theatre Company, artistic associate of Geva Theatre, and an associate professor of opera at the University of Kansas.

== Career ==
Raised in Minneapolis, Minnesota, Ocel received a bachelor of theater arts degree from the University of Minnesota Duluth in 1981. After college, he moved to Baltimore, Maryland where he worked as a stage manager for Baltimore Opera Company and the Peabody Conservatory of Music. Ocel was also a stage manager at Central City Opera, Michigan Opera Theatre, Opera Theatre of Saint Louis, Tulsa Opera, and the Idaho Shakespeare Festival.

In 1991, he became associate artistic director of the Sacramento Theatre Company, a position he held until 1995. During that time he directed The Mandrake, The Glass Menagerie, A View from the Bridge, The Grapes of Wrath, and Someone Who'll Watch Over Me for the company. Ocel became interim artistic director of that company for the 1995–1996 season. He then moved to St. Louis, Missouri where he continued working as a freelance director.

In 1998, he directed the US premiere of Alexander Goehr's opera Arianna for the Opera Theater of St. Louis.

From 2004 to 2008, he was an Associate Professor of Opera at the University of Kansas. As a Kansas professor, he "modernized the musical" Candide for a 2005 university production. In 2008, he was librettist and stage director for an opera adaptation composed by Forrest Pierce of William Inge's play Picnic. Ocel was adjunct faculty at the Conservatory of Theatre Arts at Webster University in St. Louis from 2010 to 2019.

== Reviews ==
In 2012, he directed a "first-rate Don Giovanni" for the Des Moines Metro Opera, praised for its "insightful staging" by Opera News. St. Louis Post-Dispatch critic Judith Newmark wrote that Ocel's 2013 production of David Mamet's Speed-the-Plow at the New Jewish Theater in St. Louis "embraces Mamet and his distinctive voice."

In 2022, Ocel directed the American Players Theatre production of Stones in His Pockets. A review in The Cap Times called it "a remarkable achievement for director Tim Ocel".

== Personal life ==
Ocel lives in St. Louis, Missouri. He is married to artist Peter Shank.
