= McClatchey =

McClatchey is a surname. Notable people with the surname include:

- Alan McClatchey (born 1956), British swimmer
- Caitlin McClatchey (born 1985), Scottish swimmer
- Richard McClatchey (1929–2004), American politician

== See also ==
- McClatchey Broadcasting, an American radio broadcasting company
- McClatchy, an American publishing company
