= Los Banos Enterprise =

Newspaper in California

- Type: Biweekly newspaper
- Format: Tabloid
- Owner(s): Michael W. Braa
- Founder(s): P.H. Higgins
- Founded: 1891
- Language: English
- Circulation: 16,000
- OCLC number: 20400807
- Website: losbanosenterprise.com

The Los Banos Enterprise is a newspaper that serves the city of Los Banos, California. The paper is printed bi-weekly and has a circulation of 16,000 copies. The paper had been owned by The McClatchy Company since 2003 until the company sold it in 2022 to Michael Braa.

== History ==
The Los Banos Enterprise was founded in March 1891 by Pete H. Higgins. He sold the paper in May 1891 to Carlos O. Freeman. Frank S. Smith bought the paper in 1896. A few years later the Enterprise was owned and operated by Willard Beebe. He bought the Colton News in 1903 and then leased the Enterprise to his brother Gilbert J. Beebe, who ran the paper for two years until his death from erysipelas in 1905. Fred S. Walker then became the owner. In 1906, he bought the Los Banos Advance and absorbed it into his paper. Walker sold the paper in 1908 to Leo H. Bowen and Milam G. Coats.

Mrs. Hazel Bowen took over management in February 1910. She bought the paper that April, and sold it a few days later. The new owner of the Enterprise was Bert A. Wilson. In 1915, Wilson was named post master of Los Banos. Needing to commit attention to his new position, Wilson leased the Enterprise to M.P. Lewis, who had been a foreman in the mechanical department of the paper. W.S. Walker became editor of the paper at that time. Wilson retained ownership of the Enterprise until 1944, when he sold it to Frank Merrick and Floyd R. Melvin.

In 1963, W.J. McGiffin Newspapers bought the paper from Merrick and Melvin and named J. Frank Knebel as publisher. The company later renamed itself to Brehm Communications and the Enterprise was managed by its subsidiary San Luis Publishing Co., Inc. In 1984, the subsidiary was sold to Lesher Communications, owner of the Merced Sun-Star. In 1995, Lesher sold the Enterprise to USAMedia Group Inc., based in Crystal City, Missouri. The company's name was changed five years later to Pacific Sierra Publishing Company. In 2003, McClatchy purchased the Enterprise, along with the Merced Sun-Star and four other non-dailies, from Pacific Sierra. In 2022, McClatchy sold the Enterprise to Michael Braa.
