= The Modesto Bee =

Newspaper in Modesto, California

- The July 27, 2005 front page of The Modesto Bee.
- Type: Daily newspaper
- Format: Broadsheet
- Owner: McClatchy
- Founder: J.D. Spencer
- Founded: 1868 (as Tuolumne City News)
- Language: English
- Headquarters: 948 11th St., #300, Modesto, CA 95354.
- Circulation: 29,108 Daily; 25,098 Sunday (as of 2020)
- Website: modbee.com

The Modesto Bee is a California newspaper. It is delivered throughout central California, reaching places such as Modesto, Turlock, Oakdale, Ceres, Patterson and Sonora.

== History ==
=== Modesto News ===
In February 1868, John Dillard Spencer founded the Tuolumne City News, a weekly newspaper in Tuolumne City, California. About two years later, the paper relocated to Modesto and was renamed to the Stanislaus County News.

In December 1884, Spencer launched a daily edition of his paper titled the Daily Evening News. Spencer went on to be a state assemblyman and state senator who published the paper for nearly three decades. In December 1895, Spencer died. His family continued to publish the paper. In January 1911, Mrs. M.A. Spencer and her son Herbert Spencer sold the News to O.E. Pergio, of Oakland. A year later, the paper was sold again by H. F. Spencer, A.L. Cowell and J.W. Guyler to another trio of men: E.L. Sherman and brothers Stanley T. Morgan and O.T. Morgan. The brothers were formerly connected with the Reno Gazette.

=== Modesto Herald ===
In January 1875, H.E. Luther founded the Modesto Herald. In August 1887, the Herald was bought by S.L. Hanscom, a former school teacher. Under Hanscom, the Herald was a Republican paper, picked political fights and was controversial. It was antagonistic of local city and county administrators and persistently anti-saloon. Hanscom always kept a loaded revolver at his desk and was frequently accompanied in town by a bodyguard. In February 1888, Hanscom was attacked at the post office by an angry reader who had demanded he retract an article. After a few hits, the man drew a pistol but was detained by a bystander and Hanscom fled.

In April of the same year, Hanscom was awarded $850 by a jury in a lawsuit against the paper's former owner, Dr. T.W. Drullard. Hanscom had sought to recover $1,400 in damages. In August 1889, another angry reader attempted to shoot Hanscom at his office but Hanscom was able to knock the gun upward before it fired. The bullet grazed Hanscom's face and he pulled out his own pistol. A fight ensued and police eventually arrived to arrest the attacker. That October, Hanscom was sued for libel in regards to a story he published on an election board stuffing a ballot-box. A jury acquitted him and the members of the board left the county.

Hanscom retired from the Herald and was succeeded by T.C. Hocking in September 1892. Eight years later, in 1920, a group of Modesto businessmen purchased the Herald from Hocking for $100,000. L.A. Ferris was then named Herald editor and manager.

=== Modesto Bee ===
In March 1921, the Modesto News became solely owned by E.L. Sherman. In November 1924, Sherman purchased the Modesto Morning Herald. The papers were merged together to form the Modesto News-Herald. In June 1925, Charles K. McClatchy launched a Modesto edition of The Fresno Bee called the Modesto Bee. The paper ceased after two weeks due to lack of subscriptions. In August 1927, McClatchy bought the News-Herald from Sherman. The paper's name was changed in July 1933 to the Modesto Bee and News-Herald. The name was shortened to The Modesto Bee in 1975.

In May 2024, the newspaper announced it will reduce its print days to three a week: Wednesdays, Fridays and Sundays.
