= Sacramento Theatre Company =

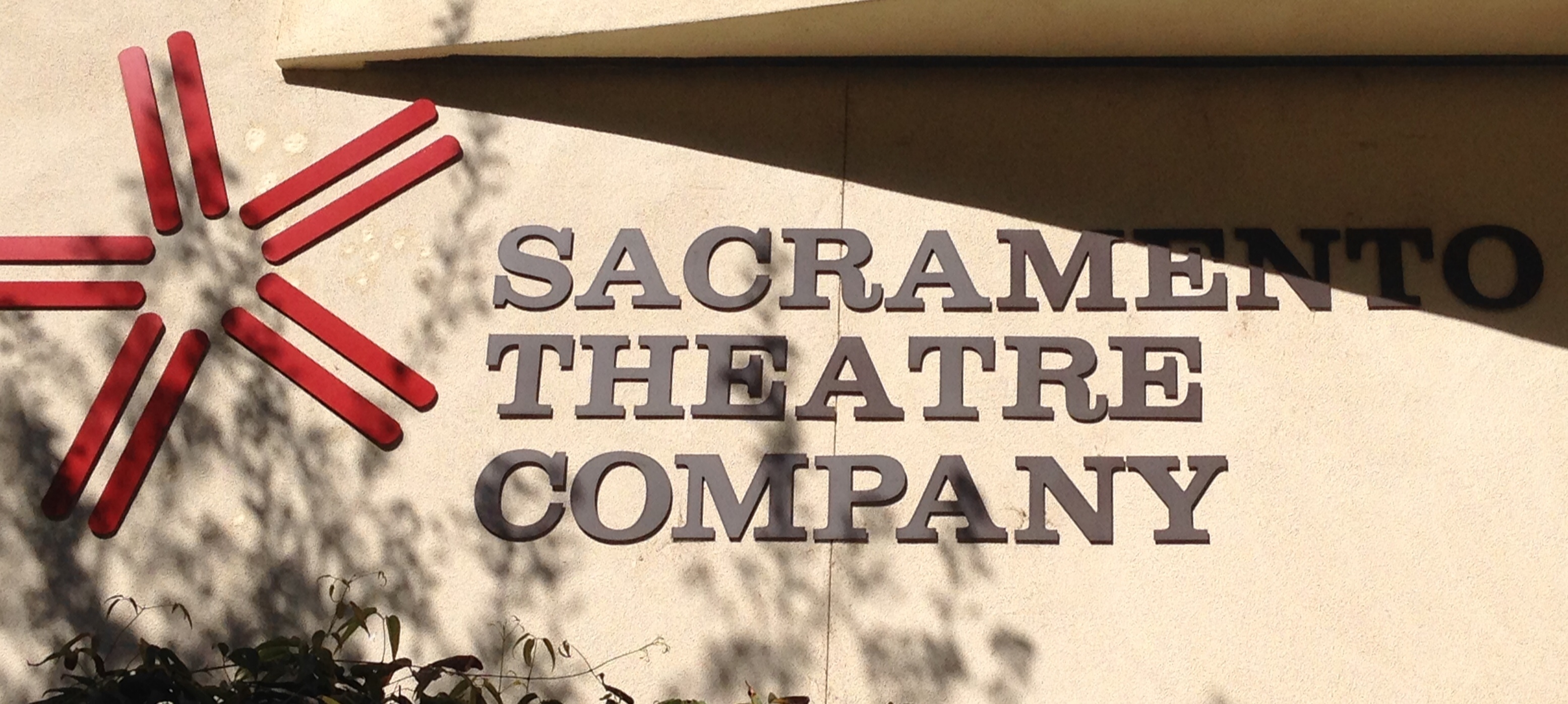
Sacramento Theatre Company, view from H Street

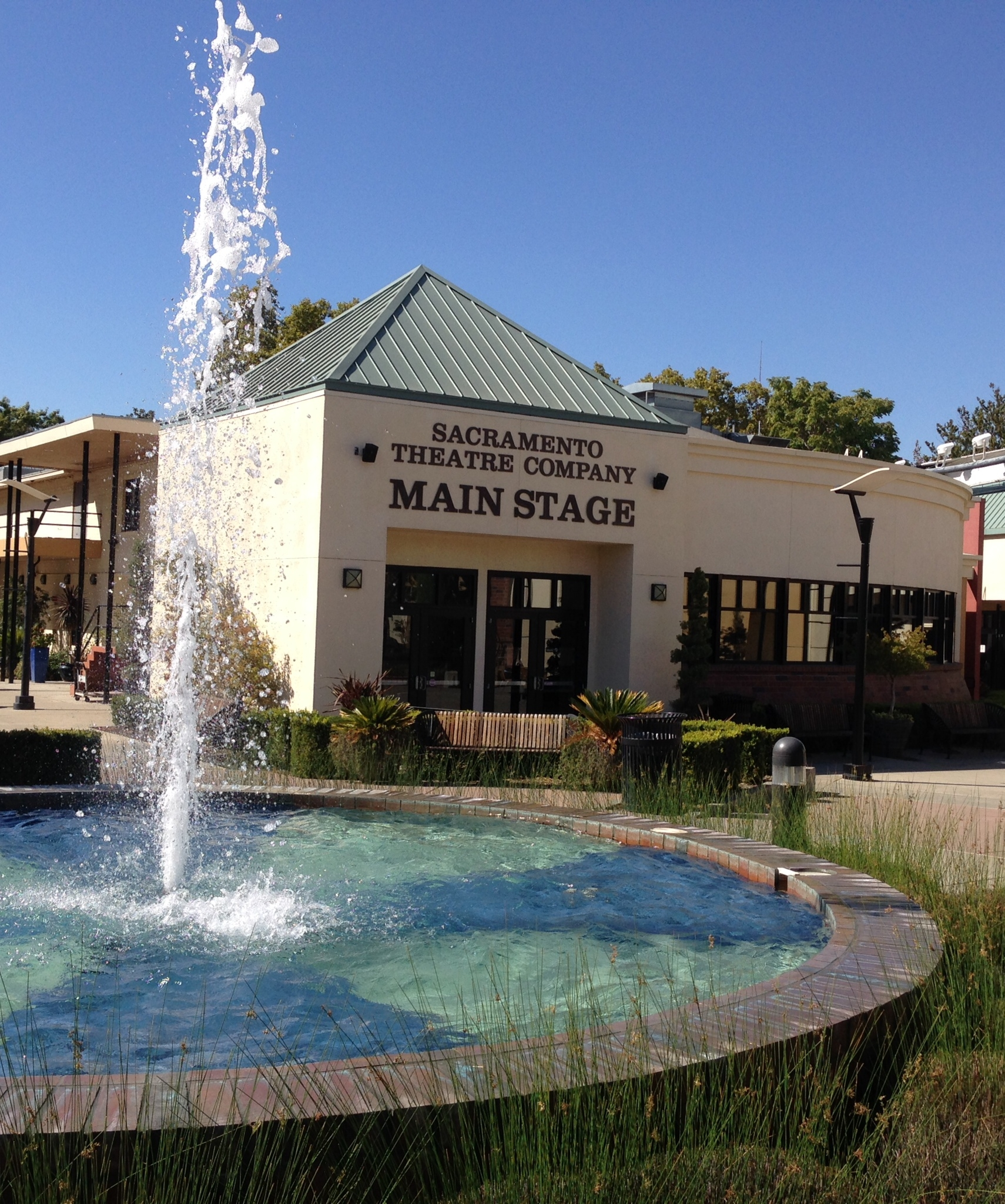
Founded in 1942, the Sacramento Theatre Company (STC) officially organized in 1945 and is one of the Sacramento region's oldest and largest professional theatre companies.

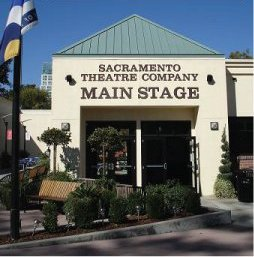
The entrance to Sacramento Theatre Company's Main Stage

The Sacramento Theatre Company (STC) was a non-profit Regional Professional Theatre in Sacramento, California. The theatre ceased operations in 2024.

== History ==
STC was formed in 1942 to entertain troops stationed in Sacramento during World War II. It was originally called the Sacramento Civic Repertory Theatre, until they moved in 1949 into their first theater home, The Eaglet Theatre.

The Eaglet was built from canvas and wood to match the Eagle Theatre from the California Gold Rush period. The new theater benefited from the patronage of Eleanor McClatchy.

== Today ==
STC is now located at the H Street Theatre Complex in Midtown Sacramento. STC stages plays in three performance spaces. STC alumni include Richard Hellesen, Tim Ocel and Tom Hanks.

== 2018–2019 season ==
The Crucible, by Arthur Miller
Steel Magnolias, by Robert Harling,
A Christmas Carol, Adapted by Richard Hellesen based on the novella by Charles Dickens,
Murder for Two by Kellen Blair and book and music by Joe Kinosian
A Midsummer Night's Dream, by William Shakespeare
When We Were Colored - A World Premiere Play, by Ginger Rutland,
Disaster!

The 2018-2019 Cabaret Series
Hooray For Hollywood! Showtunes From Stage To Screen, November 8–11, 2018
All That Jazz: Broadway Swings, January 17–20, 2019
I Can't Do It Alone: Great Showbiz Duets, March 28–31, 2019

The 2018-2019 Youth Series
Much Ado About Nothing, By William Shakespeare, September 12–23, 2018
Mary Poppins Jr., January 10–13, 2019
The Secret Garden: Spring Edition, January 31 - February 3, 2019
Oh Freedom! The Story of the Underground Railroad, February 27 - March 3, 2019
The Tempest for Kids, May 8–19, 2019

== The School of the Arts ==
STC offers elementary, middle, and high school students after-school and weekend training programs.
