= McClatchy =

American publishing company

McClatchy Media Company
- Type: Private
- Traded as: NYSE: MNI
- Industry: Publishing
- Founded: February 3, 1857; 169 years ago
- Founder: James McClatchy
- Headquarters: 26 Main Street; Chatham Borough, NJ 07928; U.S.
- Key people: Kevin McClatchy (Chairman); Tony Hunter (President and CEO)
- Products: Newspapers
- Owner: Chatham Asset Management
- Number of employees: 2,800 full and part-time (2019)
- Website: mcclatchy.com

McClatchy Media Company, also known as McClatchy, is an American publishing company incorporated under Delaware's General Corporation Law. Originally based in Sacramento, California, United States, and known as The McClatchy Company, it became a subsidiary of Chatham Asset Management, headquartered in Chatham Borough, New Jersey, as a result of its 2020 bankruptcy.

The company operates 29 daily newspapers in 14 states and has an average weekday circulation of 1.6 million and Sunday circulation of 2.4 million. In 2006, it purchased Knight Ridder, which at the time was the second-largest newspaper company in the United States. In 2024, Chatham Asset Management-owned magazine publisher A360media (formerly American Media, Inc.) was merged into McClatchy, after which the company was rebranded as McClatchy Media, and the aforementioned division became McClatchy Lifestyle & Entertainment.

McClatchy journalists have also won nine Pulitzer prizes in their 159-year history, most recently in 2017 for an article on the Panama Papers. They were also finalists in 2015 for articles on government efforts to hide Bush-era CIA Enhanced interrogation techniques.

== History ==
=== Founding ===
On February 3, 1857, The Daily Bee was first published in Sacramento, California. A few months later James McClatchy succeeded Rollin Ridge as the paper's editor. McClatchy became a co-owner on February 12, 1866, and majority stock owner on June 26, 1872. At that time the firm's name was changed to McClatchy & Co. His son Charles K. McClatchy soon joined his father as junior partner, and succeeded him upon his death in 1883.

The company founded The Fresno Bee in 1922. Brother Valentine S. McClatchy was a company co-owner, but sold out in 1923. C.K. McClatchy bought the Sacramento Star from Scripps-Howard Newspapers and absorbed it into The Bee in February 1925. He also launched a Modesto edition of The Fresno Bee called the Modesto Bee in June 1925. The paper ceased after two weeks due to lack of subscriptions. In August 1927, McClatchy bought the News-Herald, and five years later it was renamed to The Modesto Bee. In 1933, McClatchy's son Carlos K. McClatchy, who was expected to eventually take over for his father, died of Influenza. At that time McClatchy's youngest daughter Eleanor McClatchy joined the business to be trained as his successor. In 1935, the Sacramento Bee won its first Pulitzer Prize. In 1936, C.K. McClatchy died. In 1938, V.S. McClatchy died.

=== Expansion ===
Eleanor McClatchy managed the company for the next four decades. In 1963, McClatchy acquired the television station KOVR in Stockton, California, from Metromedia. In 1978, Eleanor McClatchy retired. She died two years later. Charles K. McClatchy, son of Carlos K. McClatchy, then took over as president of McClatchy Newspapers. Under him, the company acquired the Anchorage Daily News in January 1979, sold KOVR to The Outlet Company for $65 million, then purchased the Tri-City Herald in October 1979, followed by the Tacoma News Tribune and Pierce County Herald in 1986. The company went public to reduce debt in 1988, but the McClatchy family maintained 99% voting control of the corporation. C. K. McClatchy II died suddenly of a heart attack while out jogging in April 1989. He was succeeded by Erwin Potts, the first non-family member to lead the company.

In September 1989, McClatchy acquired three dailies in South Carolina from The News & Observer Company for $74.1 million. The sale included The Herald of Rock Hill, The Island Packet of Hilton Head, and The Beaufort Gazette of Beaufort. In June 1992, the Anchorage Times was acquired and consolidated into the Daily News. In August 1992, the Ellensburg Daily Record was acquired. In May 1995, McClatchy bought the rest of N&O Co., including The News & Observer of Raleigh, North Carolina, for $373 million. In June 1995, the Peninsula Gateway was purchased. In October 1996, the Daily Record was sold to Pioneer News Group. In November 1997, McClatchy agreed to purchase the Cowles Media Company for $1.4 billion. The sale was completed in March 1998. McClatchy kept the Minneapolis Star Tribune, and sold off two magazine and book publishing businesses owned by Cowles Media to PRIMEDIA for $200 million. In December 2003, McClatchy bought six newspapers in the San Joaquin Valley from Pacific-Sierra Publishing. The sale included the daily Merced Sun-Star and five non-dailies: Sierra Star of Oakhurst, Los Banos Enterprise, Chowchilla News, Atwater Signal and Livingston Chronicle.

=== Knight Ridder sale ===
In 2006, McClatchy purchased Knight Ridder for $4.5 billion and assumed $2 billion in debt. Due to the size difference, one observer equated the deal to "a dolphin swallowing a small whale." At that time Knight Ridder was the country's second largest newspaper chain and owned 32 dallies while McClatchy only owned 12 dallies. Due to antitrust concerns from the United States Department of Justice, McClatchy agreed to sell 12 former Knight Ridder papers for $2.078 billion. The San Jose Mercury and Contra Costa Times went to Bay Area News Group, co-owned by MediaNews. The St. Paul Pioneer Press and The Monterey County Herald went to Hearst Communications, who agreed to later resell them to MediaNews. The Philadelphia Inquirer and Philadelphia Daily News went to Philadelphia Media Holdings. The Akron Beacon Journal went to Black Press Media, The News-Sentinel went to Ogden Newspapers, the Duluth News Tribune went to Forum Communications Company, Aberdeen American News went to Schurz Communications. The Wilkes-Barre Times Leader was sold to private investors.

The Knight Ridder sale left McClatchy with a 15% stake in CareerBuilder, a 15% stake in ShopLocal and a 11.5% stake in Topix.net. In December 2006, McClatchy sold the Minneapolis Star Tribune, its largest newspaper at the time, for $530 million to private-equity firm Avista Capital Partners. Selling at a loss gave McClatchy a $160 million tax break.

=== Al Qaeda leadership reporting ===
On August 4, 2013, McClatchy Newspapers, citing anonymous sources, reported on conversations between Ayman al-Zawahiri, who succeeded Osama bin Laden as the head of Al Qaeda, and Nasser al-Wuhayshi, the head of the Yemen-based Al Qaeda in the Arabian Peninsula, discussing an alleged imminent terrorist attack. Two days previously, The New York Times had agreed to withhold the identities of the Al Qaeda leaders after US intelligence officials claimed the information could jeopardize their operations. Government analysts and officials interviewed by the Times said this disclosure caused more immediate damage to American counter-terrorism efforts than the thousands of classified documents disclosed by Edward Snowden; after the McClatchy publication, there was a sharp drop in the terrorists' use of a major communications channel that the authorities were monitoring. Subsequently, officials searched for new ways to monitor communications among Al Qaeda's leaders and operatives.

=== Bankruptcy ===
Amid the Great Recession, McClatchy cut its workforce by 10% in 2008. Pruitt left the company in 2012 and was succeeded as CEO by Patrick Talamantes. In January 2017, Craig Forman was appointed as the new president and chief executive officer. In February 2019, Forman emailed all staff to say about 10% of the newspaper chain's employees would be offered voluntary buyouts.

On February 13, 2020, The McClatchy Company and 54 affiliated companies filed for Chapter 11 bankruptcy protection in the United States District Court for the Southern District of New York. The company cited pension obligations and excessive debt as the primary reasons for the filing. The debt obtained from the Knight Ridder acquisition and the decision not to retain any of Knight Ridder's digital division or corporate staff, despite the growing prominence of the Internet and Knight Ridder having a well-respected effort in the space at the time, were cited as contributing factors in the bankruptcy. In August 2020, the Court approved an offer by Chatham Asset Management—a hedge fund that also owns a 66% share in Canadian publisher Postmedia—to acquire McClatchy for $312 million. The company stated that it would not impose any layoffs, and would honor all existing union agreements. Tony W. Hunter was named CEO.

=== Divestment and consolidation ===
In August 2022, McClatchy sold the Los Banos Enterprise. On July 11, 2023, McClatchy laid off the editorial cartoonists of three of its newspapers, Kevin Siers at The Charlotte Observer, Jack Ohman at The Sacramento Bee, and Joel Pett at the Lexington Herald-Leader. In November 2023, McClatchy sold its Charlotte printing plant to North State Media for $4.65 million. In March 2024, the company dropped its Associated Press wire service.

In December 2024, Chatham Asset Management-owned magazine publisher a360media (the former American Media, Inc.) was merged into McClatchy, with the company renamed McClatchy Media, and a360media's assets forming the basis of the new McClatchy Lifestyle & Entertainment division.

In May 2025, the company announced that Closer, First for Women, In Touch, and Life & Style would cease publication, with their staff laid off. In November 2025, the company closed its Washington, D.C. bureau. In July 2026, McClatchy sold the Columbus Ledger-Enquirer and The Macon Telegraph to the National Trust for Local News.

=== 2026 layoffs ===
On September 10, 2026, McClatchy conducted widespread layoffs across its newsrooms. Altogether across multiple newsrooms and states, about 90 newsroom staff positions were eliminated. Approximately 30 editorial roles (over a third of the staff) at the Miami Herald were cut. Other outlets with significant cuts included The Bellingham Herald, the Idaho Statesman, and the Lexington Herald-Leader, which cut 13 of its 23 newsroom employees. McClatchy executive Greg Farmer attributed the cuts to a 41 percent decline in consumer revenue over five years despite steady expenses, stating the company could no longer sustain its prior investment levels and would instead prioritize "differentiated" and "consequential" journalism. A company representative said the layoffs were unrelated to McClatchy's earlier rollout of an AI summarization tool, which had drawn criticism from journalists earlier in the year.

== Business ventures ==
=== DC Bureau ===
McClatchyDC was a news agency that distributed original reporting from McClatchy's Washington, D.C. bureau, which was acquired from Knight Ridder in 2006. It was the largest client of the McClatchy-Tribune Information Services. In 2008, McClatchy's bureau chief in D.C., John Walcott, was the first recipient of the I. F. Stone Medal for Journalistic Independence, awarded by the Nieman Foundation for Journalism. In November 2025, McClatchyDC ceased operations.

=== El Dorado Newspapers ===
In 1978, McClatchy formed El Dorado Newspapers, a subsidiary created to acquire and administer smaller newspapers in California. El Dorado acquired the Gilroy Dispatch in September 1978, The Morgan Hill Times in July 1979, Clovis Independent in October 1979, Lincoln News Messenger in May 1980, and Hollister Free Lance in January 1981. The Dispatch, Free Lance and The Times were operated under the name Gavilan Newspapers. In April 1989, El Dorado in one deal acquired the Amador Ledger, Amador Dispatch, Amador Progress-News and Amador Advertiser. The Ledger and Dispatch were then merged to form the Amador Ledger-Dispatch.

In September 1994, McClatchy sold the Lincoln News Messenger to Brehm Communications Inc. In October 1996, McClatchy announced it would sell the Amador Ledger-Dispatch, Hollister Free Lance, Morgan Hill Times and Gilroy Dispatch to USMedia Group, Inc. The Clovis Independent, the last paper to have operated under the El Dorado banner, ceased operations in June 2008.

=== Nando Media ===
Nando Media was an Internet subsidiary that provided business support and material for Internet media. McClatchy acquired it when it purchased The News & Observer Company in 1995. The Nando brand was abandoned and the unit was renamed to McClatchy Interactive in 2005. It was absorbed into the rest of McClatchy in 2015 and became the company's digital division.

=== Newswire ===
McClatchy inherited a partnership with the Tribune Company in the news service Knight Ridder-Tribune Information Services, renamed to McClatchy-Tribune Information Services, when it acquired Knight Ridder in 2006. Tribune bought out McClatchy's share of the company in 2014 and moved its headquarters to Chicago.

=== Ponderay Newsprint Mill ===
McClatchy was part of a consortium of five U.S. newspaper companies that, along with a Canadian forest products company, jointly owned the Ponderay Newsprint Mill near Spokane, Washington. The plant opened in 1989 and closed in 2020. A year later it sold for $18.1 million to a California-based venture capital company.

== Publications ==
=== Daily newspapers ===
Note: (*)—Indicates newspaper acquired in 2006 Knight Ridder purchase.

- The Beaufort Gazette (Beaufort, South Carolina)
- Belleville News-Democrat (Belleville, Illinois)*
- The Bellingham Herald (Bellingham, Washington)*
- The Bradenton Herald (Bradenton, Florida)*
- Centre Daily Times (State College, Pennsylvania)*
- The Charlotte Observer (Charlotte, North Carolina)*
- Ledger-Enquirer (Columbus, Georgia)*
- The Fresno Bee (Fresno, California)
- The Herald (Rock Hill, South Carolina)
- The Herald-Sun (Durham, North Carolina)
- The Idaho Statesman (Boise, Idaho)*
- The Island Packet (Hilton Head, South Carolina)
- The Kansas City Star (Kansas City, Missouri)*
- Lexington Herald-Leader (Lexington, Kentucky)*
- Merced Sun-Star (Merced, California)
- Miami Herald (Miami, Florida)*
- El Nuevo Herald (Miami, Florida)*
- The Modesto Bee (Modesto, California)
- The News & Observer (Raleigh, North Carolina)
- The Olathe News (Olathe, Kansas)*
- The Olympian (Olympia, Washington)*
- The Sacramento Bee (Sacramento, California)
- Fort Worth Star-Telegram (Fort Worth, Texas)*
- The State (Columbia, South Carolina)*
- Sun Herald (Biloxi, Mississippi)*
- Sun News (Myrtle Beach, South Carolina)*
- The News Tribune (Tacoma, Washington)*
- The Telegraph (Macon, Georgia)*
- The San Luis Obispo Tribune (San Luis Obispo, California)*
- The Wichita Eagle (Wichita, Kansas)
- Tri-City Herald (Kennewick, Washington)

=== Magazines ===
- Closer
- First for Women
- In Touch
- Life & Style
- Us Weekly
- Woman's World

==== Dailies acquired in Knight Ridder purchase, then sold ====
- Aberdeen American News (Aberdeen, South Dakota)
  (Completed June 27, 2006)
- Akron Beacon Journal (Akron, Ohio)
  (Completed August 2, 2006)
- Contra Costa Times (Walnut Creek, California)
  (Completed August 2, 2006)
- Duluth News Tribune (Duluth, Minnesota)
  (Completed June 27, 2006)
- Fort Wayne News-Sentinel (Fort Wayne, Indiana)
  (Completed June 27, 2006)
- Grand Forks Herald (Grand Forks, North Dakota)
  (Completed June 27, 2006)
- The Herald (Monterey, California)
  (Completed August 2, 2006)
- Philadelphia Daily News (Philadelphia, Pennsylvania)
  (Completed June 29, 2006)
- The Philadelphia Inquirer (Philadelphia, Pennsylvania)
  (Completed June 29, 2006)
- St. Paul Pioneer Press (St. Paul, Minnesota)
  (Completed August 2, 2006)
- San Jose Mercury News (San Jose, California)
  (Completed August 2, 2006)
- Times Leader (Wilkes-Barre, Pennsylvania)
  (Completed August 2, 2006)

== Formerly-owned stations ==
McClatchy Broadcasting was founded in 1936 when four radio stations in California merged to operate under one ownership. In 1987, McClatchy divested its remaining four radio stations; KFBK and KAER to Group W, and KMJ and KNAX to Henry Broadcasting Co., in order to focus on its newspaper properties.

- Stations are arranged in alphabetical order by state and city of license.
- Two boldface asterisks appearing following a station's call letters (**) indicate a station built and signed on by McClatchy.

Stations owned by McClatchy Broadcasting
Media market	State	Station	Purchased	Sold	Notes
Bakersfield	California	KERN **	1932	1962	
Bakersfield	California	KERN-FM **	1948	1962	
Fresno	California	KMJ	1925	1987	
Fresno	California	KNAX **	1948	1987	(Note: Known as KMJ-FM prior to 1981.)
Fresno	California	KMJ-TV **	1953	1981	
Modesto	California	KBEE	1956	1983	
Modesto	California	KBEE-FM **	1948	1983	
Sacramento	California	KVQ	1922		
Sacramento	California	KFBK	1922	1987	
Sacramento	California	KAER **	1947	1987	(Note: Known as KFBK-FM prior to 1978.)
Stockton	California	KWG	1930	1955	
Stockton	California	KOVR	1963	1980	
Reno	Nevada	KOH	1931	1982	
Reno	Nevada	KNEV	1978	1982	

This list does not include an unbuilt Channel 10 station in Sacramento, CA, which went to KBET-TV (now KXTV), owned by Sacramento Telecasters.

== See also ==
- Seattle Times – McClatchy owns 49.5% stake, with the Blethen family controlling the other 50.5%
