= Charles Kenny McClatchy =

American journalist

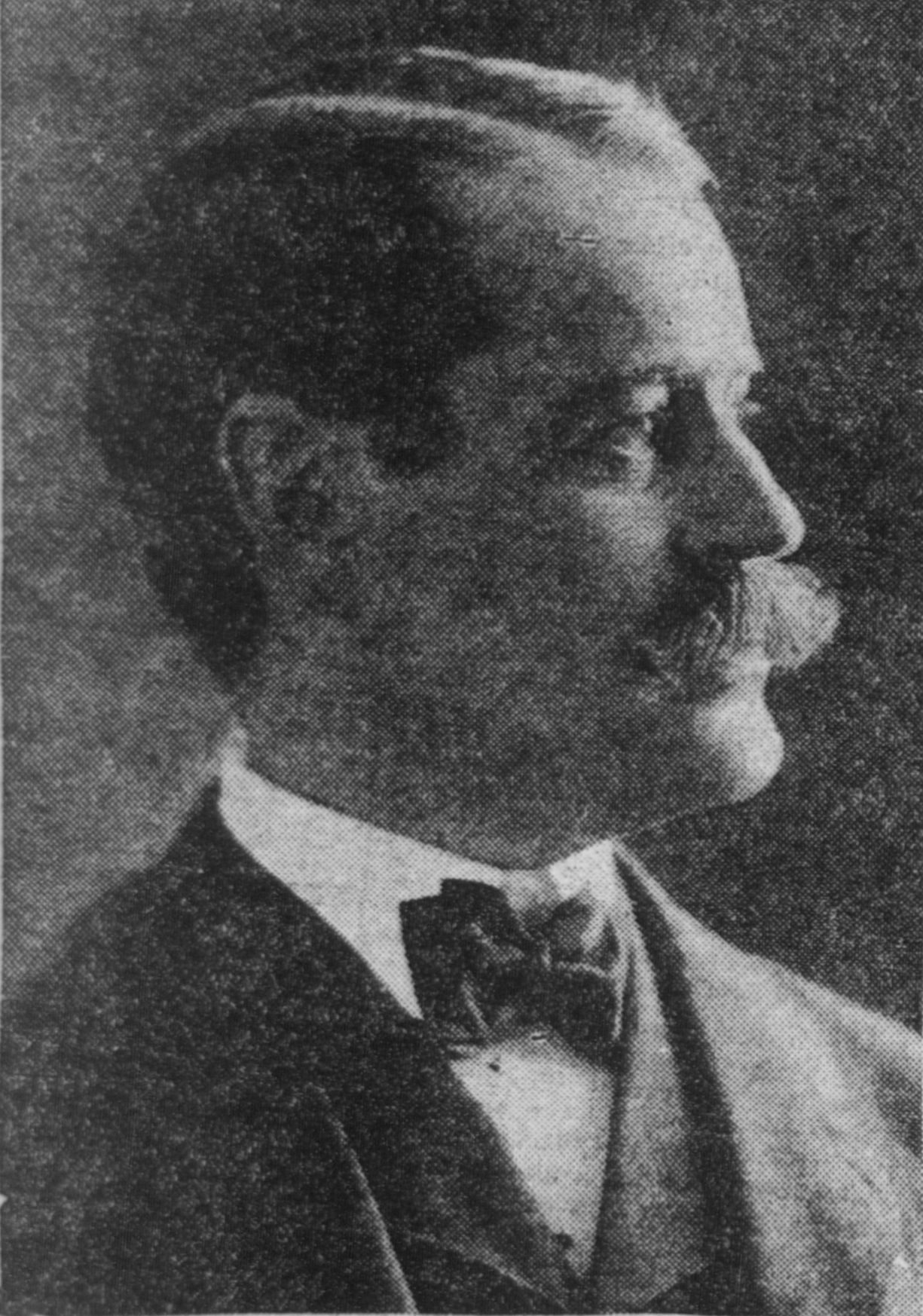
C. K. McClatchy

Charles Kenny McClatchy, better known as C. K. McClatchy (November 1, 1858 – April 27, 1936), was the editor of The Sacramento Bee and a founder of McClatchy Newspapers, the family-owned company that was forerunner to The McClatchy Company.

McClatchy attended Santa Clara University, where he earned a Masters of Arts in 1901. He took over the Sacramento paper upon the death of his father, James McClatchy, in 1883 and led it into the 20th century, continuing the newspaper's battles for labor rights; against the abuses of big mining, the railroads, and corrupt government; and fiercely defending a publication's right to editorial freedom. He was instrumental in the founding of The Fresno Bee in 1922 and the establishment of The Modesto Bee with its purchase in 1924. McClatchy also owned KFBK (AM), an AM radio station in Sacramento.

His son, Carlos, who had been groomed to take over the business, died in 1933; McClatchy then turned to his daughter, Eleanor, who after his death became president of the McClatchy Company and led it for the next forty years. Carlos's son, known as C. K. McClatchy (like his grandfather) served as president of McClatchy Newspapers between 1979 and 1989.

C.K. McClatchy High School in Sacramento, which opened in 1937 about a year after his death, was named in honor of McClatchy.

Business positions
Preceded by James McClatchy	McClatchy President; 1883–1936	Succeeded by Eleanor McClatchy
