= C. K. McClatchy II =

American newspaper publisher

Charles Kenny McClatchy (March 25, 1927 – April 16, 1989) was an American newspaper publisher. He was a son of Carlos K. McClatchy, the first editor of The Fresno Bee. He became president of McClatchy Newspapers upon the death of his aunt, Eleanor McClatchy in 1980. Over the next decade, until his death, he guided the family-owned media company on a course that led toward The McClatchy Company, a major, nationwide newspaper chain.

Business positions
Preceded by Eleanor McClatchy	McClatchy CEO; 1978–1989 (McClatchy became a public company in 1988)	Succeeded by Erwin Potts
