= The Sacramento Bee =

Daily newspaper in Sacramento, California

- Front page of The Sacramento Bee, April 29, 2024
- Type: Daily newspaper
- Format: Broadsheet
- Owner: The McClatchy Company
- Editor: Chris Fusco
- Founded: 1857 (as The Daily Bee)
- Headquarters: 1601 Alhambra Boulevard, Suite 100; Sacramento, California 95816; USA
- Circulation: 30,000 Digital Subscribers; 90,244 Daily; 142,589 Sunday (as of 2020)
- ISSN: 0890-5738
- OCLC number: 37706143
- Website: sacbee.com

The Sacramento Bee is a daily newspaper published in Sacramento, California, in the United States. The paper was founded in 1857 is distributed in the upper Sacramento Valley. The Bee is the flagship of the nationwide McClatchy Company. Its "Scoopy Bee" mascot, created by Walt Disney in 1943, has been used by all three Bee newspapers (in Sacramento, Modesto, and Fresno).

== History ==
On February 3, 1857, the first edition of The Daily Bee was published in Sacramento. The paper was the successor to the suspended California American. The Bee's first editorial read that "the object of this newspaper is not only independence, but permanence". It was founded by four printers: L.C. Chandler, L.P. Davis, John Church and W.H. Tobey.

The paper immediately faced competition from the older Sacramento Union. Within a week of its creation, The Bee broke its first big news story by uncovering a state scandal which led to the impeachment of Know-Nothing California State Treasurer Henry Bates. John Rollin Ridge was the paper's first editor, but he soon left The Bee that July. He went on to edit a Democrat-slanted pro-slavery paper in Oroville. Ridge was succeeded at The Bee by James McClatchy.

McClatchy became a co-owner on February 12, 1866, and majority stock owner on June 26, 1872. At that time the firm's name was changed to James McClatchy & Co. His son Charles K. McClatchy soon joined his father as junior partner, and succeeded him upon his death in 1883. C.K. McClatchy founded The Fresno Bee in 1922. His brother Valentine S. McClatchy was a co-owner in both papers, but sold out in 1923. C.K. McClatchy bought the Sacramento Star from Scripps-Howard Newspapers and absorbed it into The Bee in 1925, and also acquired the Modesto News-Herald in 1927, which five years later was renamed to The Modesto Bee. In 1936, C.K. McClatchy died.

Members of the McClatchy family continued to manage the company as it grew to a chain of 12 papers. In 1988, the McClatchy Company went public to reduce debt, but the family maintained 99% control of the corporation. In March 2006, McClatchy Company purchased Knight Ridder, the second-largest chain of daily newspapers in the United States, for $4.5 billion. The deal left McClatchy with 32 daily papers in 29 markets, with a total circulation of 3.3 million.

In 2020, McClatchy Company filed for Chapter 11 Bankruptcy. The company was then bought for $312 million by Chatham Asset Management, which also owned Postmedia in Canada. Thus McClatchy family stewardship of The Bee ended after 163 years. That fall, the paper announced it will vacate its longtime headquarters and close its printing plant in Midtown Sacramento. Production of The Bee was moved to the San Francisco Chronicle's printing plant in Fremont. The Bee relocated its office to the Cannery, a business park occupying the redeveloped former Libby, McNeill and Libby Cannery.

In 2020, The Bee moved to a six-day printing schedule, eliminating its printed Saturday edition.

== Recognition ==
The Sacramento Bee has won six Pulitzer Prizes in its history. It has won numerous other awards, including many for its progressive public service campaigns promoting free speech (the Bee often criticized government policy, and uncovered many scandals hurting Californians), anti-racism (The Bee supported the Union during the American Civil War and publicly denounced the Ku Klux Klan), worker's rights (The Bee has a strong history of supporting unionization), and environmental protection (leading numerous tree-planting campaigns and fighting against environmental destruction in the Sierra Nevada).

== Notable people ==
- Deborah Blum – science writer
- Renée C. Byer – photojournalist
- Gil Duran – California opinion editor and former Press Secretary for California governor Jerry Brown.
- Jack Ohman – cartoonist
- Nick Peters – baseball writer
- Paul Avery – journalist who reported on the Zodiac killer
- Pete Dexter – former columnist, novelist, screenwriter
- Nancy Weaver Teichert – former reporter
