= The Fresno Bee =

Three-times a week newspaper serving Fresno, California

- The 2005-07-27 front page of; The Fresno Bee
- Type: Three-times a week newspaper
- Format: Broadsheet
- Owner: The McClatchy Company
- Publisher: Tim Ritchey
- Editor: Christopher Kirkpatrick
- Founded: 1922; 104 years ago
- Language: English
- Headquarters: 2721 Ventura Street; Fresno, California 93786; United States
- Circulation: 41,792 Daily; 42,052 Sunday (as of 2020)
- ISSN: 0889-6070
- Website: fresnobee.com

The Fresno Bee is a three-times a week newspaper serving Fresno, California, and surrounding counties in that U.S. state's central San Joaquin Valley. It is owned by The McClatchy Company.

== History ==
On September 23, 1876, the first edition of Fresno Morning Republican was published. Its first editor was E.E. Curtis. One of the paper's founders was Dr. Chester A. Rowell, and its original group of investors included inventor and entrepreneur Frank Dusy.

In May 1879, S.A. Miller bought the paper from Rowell. In May 1885, R.F. Brewington and named John W. Short editor. In January 1886, Short and J.W. Shanklin purchased the Republican. A year later the two launched a daily edition.

In April 1890, T.C. Judkins became the owner. In January 1892, Short was named editor again. In June 1898, Short retired from the paper after he was appointed as the city's postmaster. Rowell succeeded him as editor and manager. In November 1919, Short died.

In June 1915, George A. Osborne and Chase E. Osborne Jr., sons of former Michigan governor Chase Osborn, bought the Fresno Herald. In October 1920, Rowell sold the Republican for $1 million to the Osbornes, who merged it with the Herald.

On October 17, 1922, the first issue of The Fresno Bee was published by The McClatchy Company, owner of The Sacramento Bee. Carlos McClatchy was the paper's first editor. In March 1932, the McClatchys purchased The Republican from the Osbornes and merged it into the Bee.

In August 1990, the Bee launched a Spanish-English language paper called Vida en el Valle. In 1996, the paper launched a website and fully integrated its digital team into the newsroom nine years later. In 2004, McClatchy purchased the Sierra Star in Oakhurst. In June 2018, the Star was consolidated into the Bee.

The Bee was originally housed at the Fresno Bee Building, but moved throughout downtown Fresno over the decades. In March 2020, the paper relocated its headquarters to Bitwise 41, owned by Bitwise Industries. In July 2024, the Bee announced it would reduce its print days to three a week: Wednesdays, Fridays and Sundays. In November 2025, the paper laid off two opinion writers.

== Devin Nunes ==
From 2017, the Bee's relationship with their hometown U.S. representative Devin Nunes deteriorated. Nunes took issue with several op-eds the paper published on his handling of Russian interference in the 2016 elections. He responded by airing TV ads attacking the paper and mailing constituents a 40-page glossy pamphlet solely focused on attacking The Bee's reputation. Nunes resigned from the U.S. House on January 1, 2022.
