= Sacramento Historic City Cemetery =

Historic cemetery in California, United States

- U.S. National Register of Historic Places
- California Historical Landmark
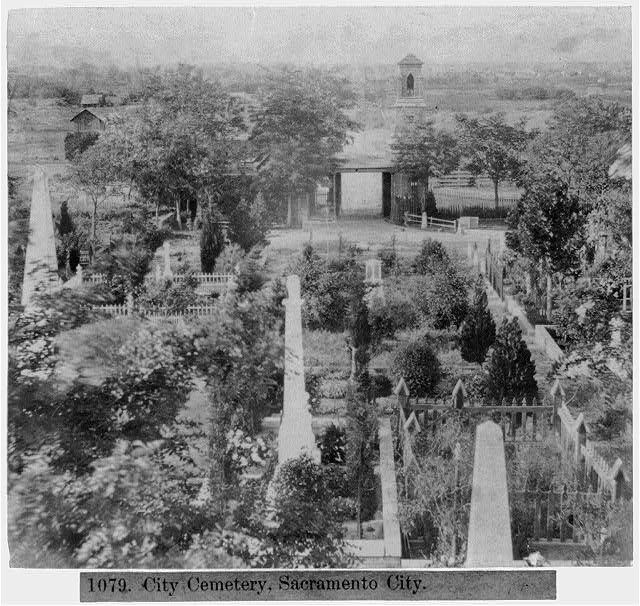
- Sacramento City Cemetery in 1866
- Location: 1000 Broadway, Sacramento, California, U.S.
- Coordinates: 38°33′45″N 121°30′04″W
- Built: 1849
- Architectural style: Victorian Garden style
- NRHP reference No.: 14000889
- CHISL No.: 566

Significant dates
- Added to NRHP: 5 November 2014
- Designated CHISL: 5 May 1957

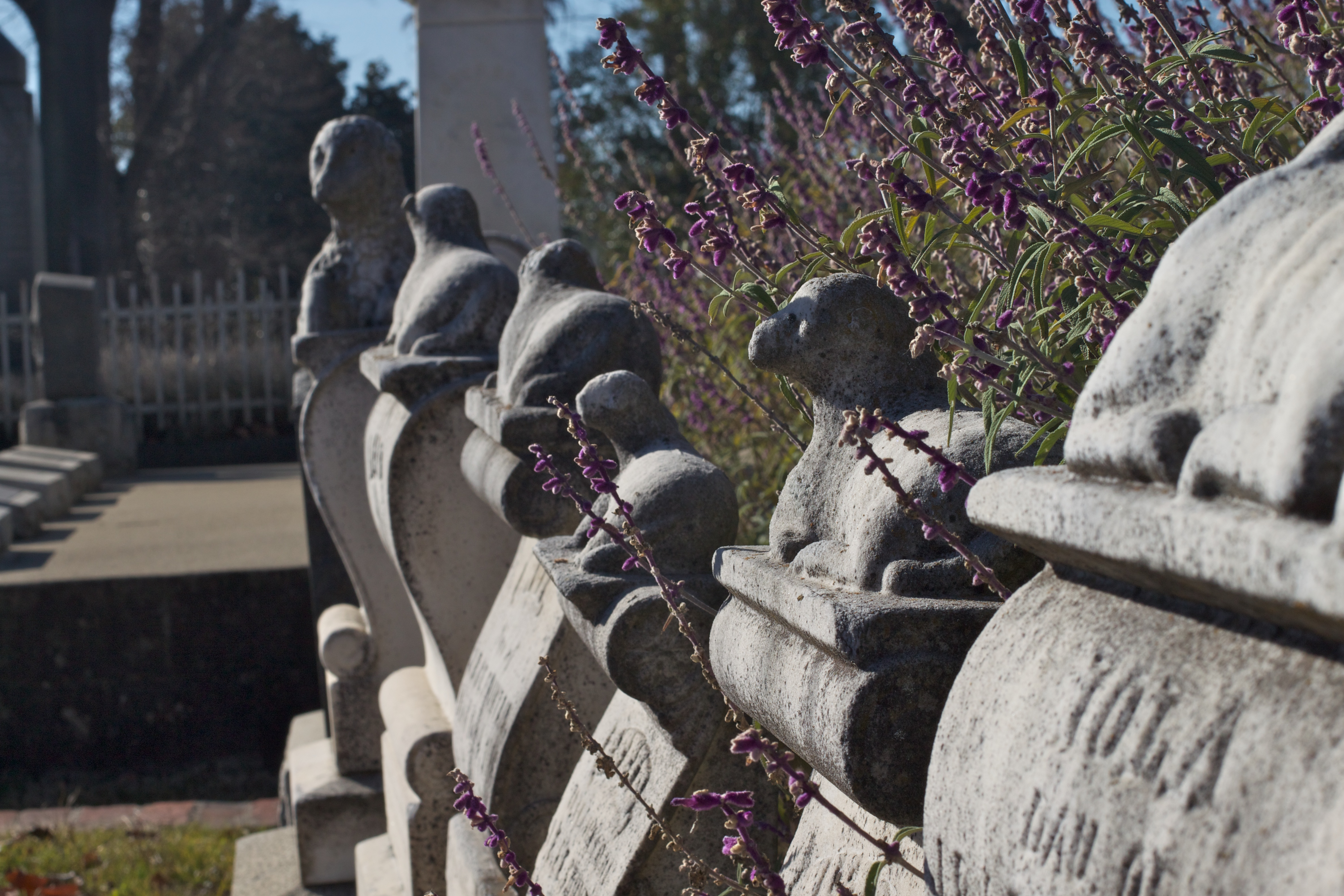
Gravestones in Old City Cemetery, 2012

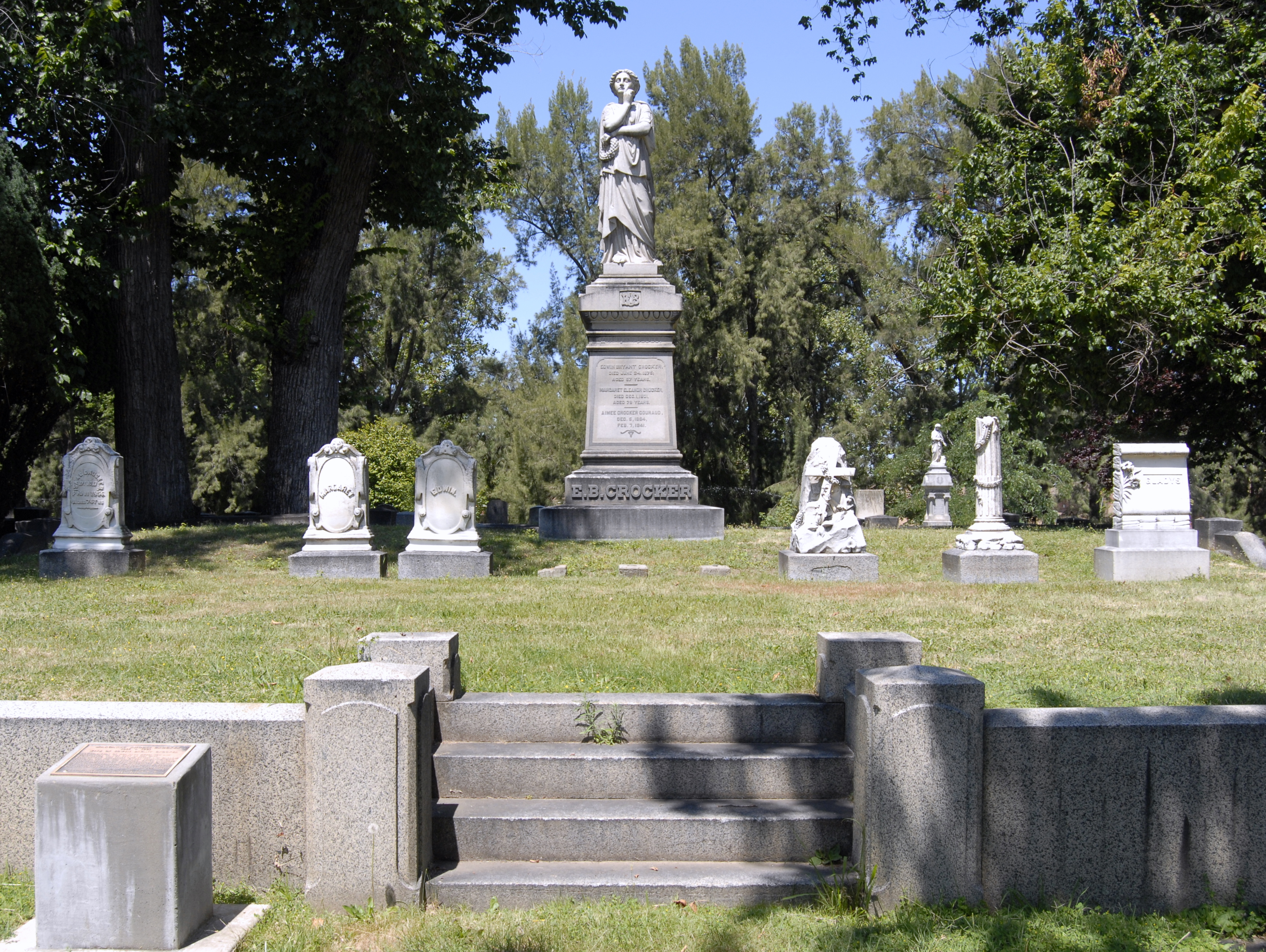
Graves of the Edwin B. Crocker family

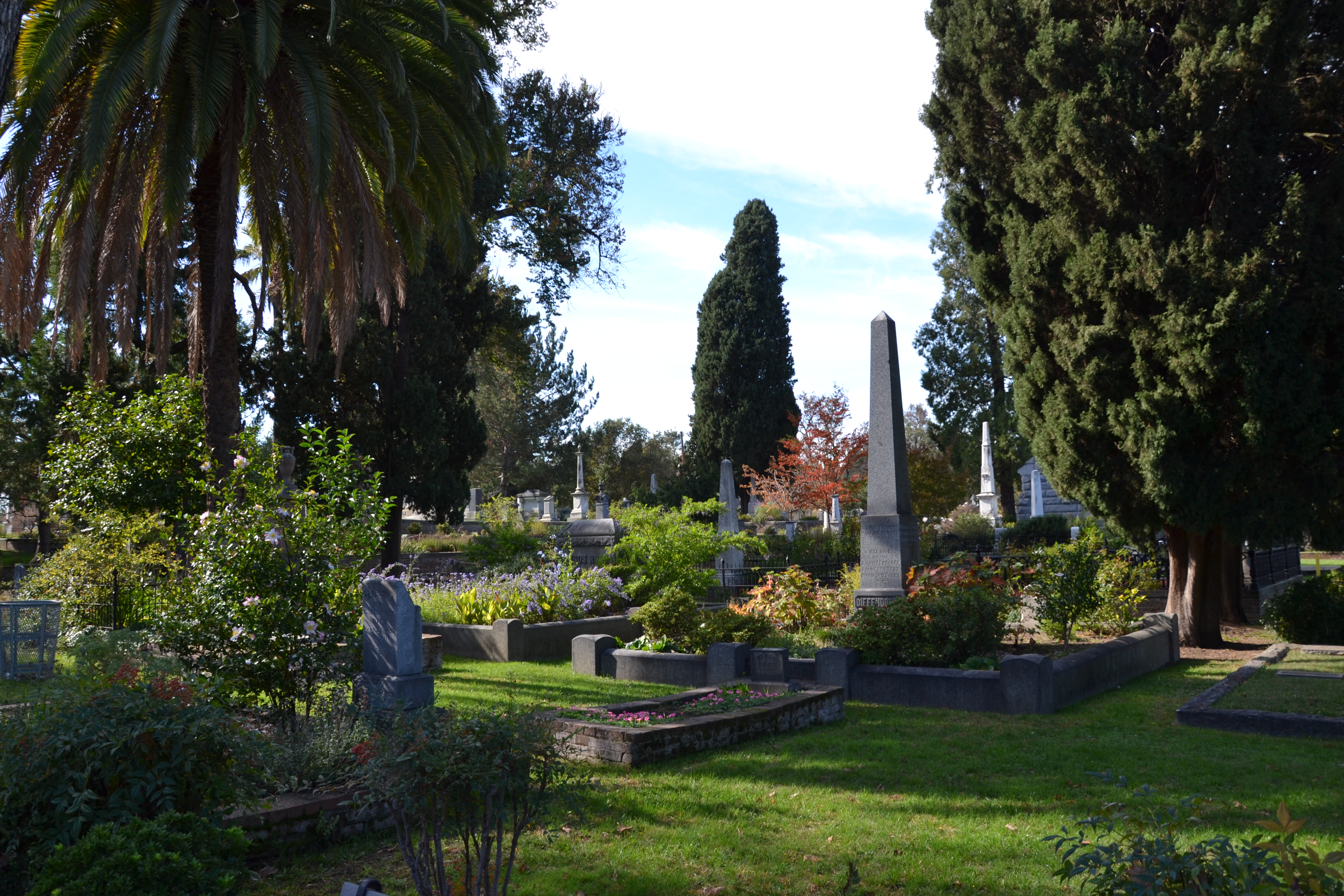
View from the northeast corner of the cemetery

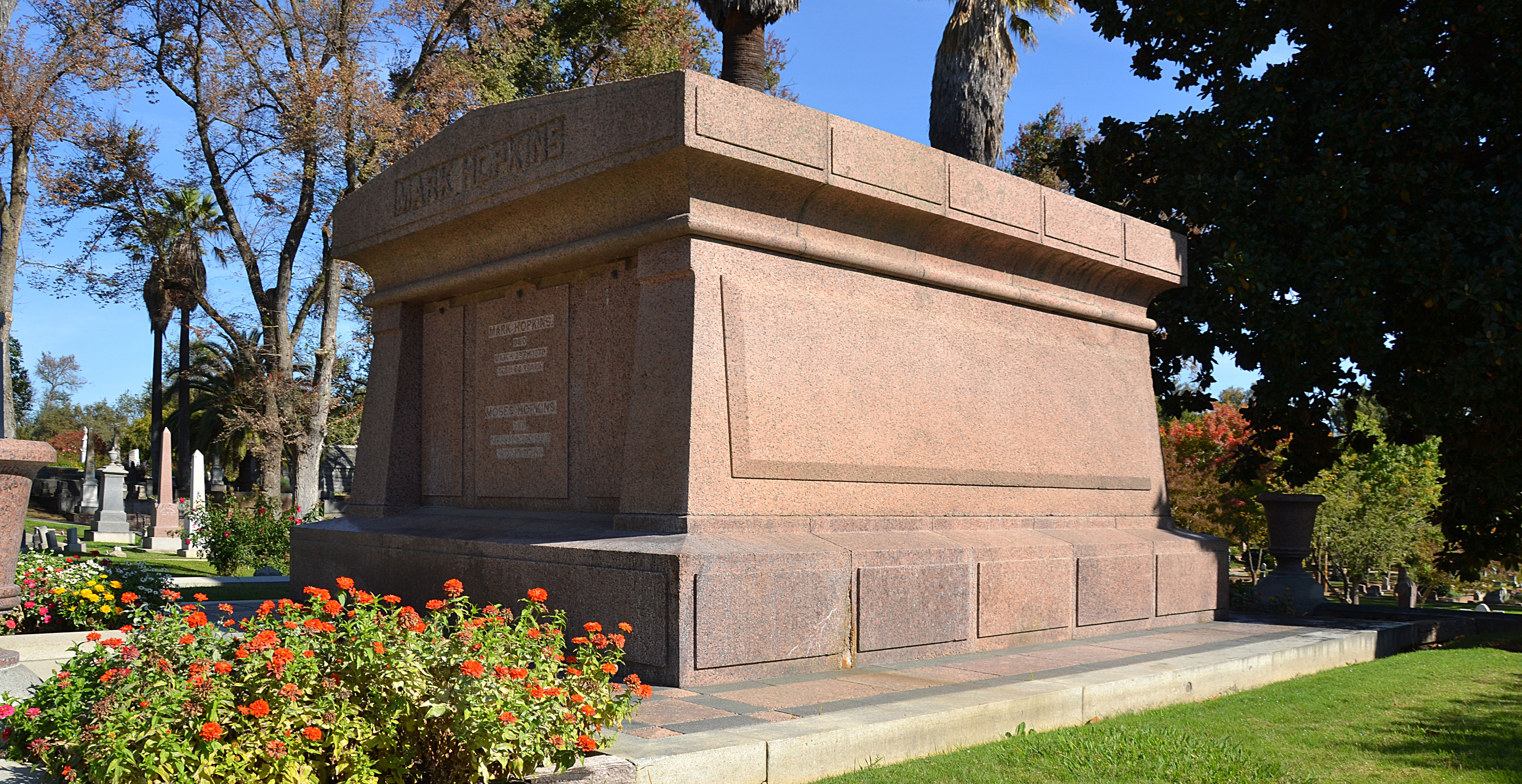
The massive Mark Hopkins, Jr. grave

The Sacramento Historic City Cemetery (or Old City Cemetery), located at 1000 Broadway, at 10th Street, is the oldest existing cemetery in Sacramento, California. It was designed to resemble a Victorian garden and sections that are not located in level areas are surrounded by brick or concrete retaining walls to create level terraces. The cemetery grounds are noted for their roses which are said to be among the finest in California.

== History ==
The cemetery was established in 1849 when Sacramento founder John Augustus Sutter, Jr. donated 10 acres (4.0 ha) to the city for this purpose. The grounds were landscaped in the Victorian Garden style popular at the time. The New Helvetia Cemetery was founded in c. 1845 and was also prone to flooding, which would unbury the bodies from the earlier graves; as a result some of the burials from New Helvetia were reinterred to the Sacramento Historic City Cemetery starting as early as 1850.

In 1850, some 600 victims of the Cholera epidemic that swept the city were buried in mass graves in City Cemetery. The remainder 800 victims claimed by the epidemic were buried in the nearby New Helvetia Cemetery, also in mass graves. In 1852, a monument was erected to those who died. However the exact location of the mass burial plot is not known.

In 1856, the city engaged a cemetery superintendent and began to plan the grounds. In 1857, the gatehouse and bell tower were constructed. These were demolished in 1949 during the widening of Broadway. Several fraternal groups purchased sections for their members including the Masons (1859), Odd Fellows (1861) and the Sacramento Pioneers Association (1862). The city set aside a section for volunteer firemen in 1858 and members of the Grand Army of the Republic in 1878. The cemetery continued to acquire additional land through 1880 when Margaret Crocker, widow of Edwin B. Crocker, donated 23 acres (9.3 ha) to expand the grounds to 60 acres (24 ha) total. The City of Sacramento owns the cemetery, which today encompasses 44 acres (18 ha).

It was declared a State Historic Landmark on May 5, 1957, by the State Historical Landmarks Commission. The cemetery was listed on the National Register of Historic Places in 2014.

== Notable burials ==
These are some of the notable people interred in the cemetery:

- Hardin Bigelow – first directly elected Mayor of Sacramento
- Marion Biggs – US Representative
- John Bigler – third Governor of California and Minister to Chile
- Newton Booth – United States Senator & eleventh Governor of California
- John Chilton Burch – US Representative
- Amos P. Catlin – California State Legislator that wrote and carried the bill to make Sacramento the permanent capital of California
- Thomas Jefferson Clunie – US Representative
- George B. Cosby – Confederate State Army Brigader General
- Aimée Crocker – heiress daughter of Edwin B. Crocker
- Edwin B. Crocker – California Supreme Court Justice and founder of the Crocker Art Museum
- Jerome C. Davis – Pioneer rancher/farmer and namesake of Davis, California and UC Davis, which were built on his former land
- John W. Donnellan – 1st Treasurer of the Wyoming Territory
- Charles Duncombe – Member of the Legislative Assembly of Upper Canada, California State Assemblymember in Sacramento County and one of the first doctors in Sacramento
- James L. English – Mayor of Sacramento and California State Treasurer
- Newton T. Gould – Civil War soldier and Medal of Honor recipient
- William S. Hamilton – son of American founding father Alexander Hamilton. He died in Sacramento, most likely of cholera, in 1850.
- Frederick W. Hatch (clergy) – served as Chaplain of the United States Senate
- Frederick W. Hatch (physician) – early physician and educator
- Mark Hopkins Jr. – one of the Big Four & a founder of the Central Pacific Railroad
- William Irwin – thirteenth Governor of California
- Grove L. Johnson – US Representative and father of US Senator & Governor of California Hiram Johnson
- John F. Madden – US Army brigadier general
- Hugh C. Murray – California Supreme Court Justice
- Henry L. Nichols – Mayor of Sacramento and Secretary of State of California
- Levi Rackliffe – State Treasurer of California
- Benjamin B. Redding – Mayor of Sacramento, California State Assemblymember, Secretary of State of California and the namesake for the city of Redding, California
- Lebbeus Simkins – Civil War sailor and Medal of Honor recipient
- Royal T. Sprague – California State Senator and California Supreme Court Justice
- John Augustus Sutter Jr. – founder and planner of the City of Sacramento, US Consul in Acapulco, Mexico and son of John Augustus Sutter, Sr.
- Jabez Turner – Mayor of Sacramento
- A. A. H. Tuttle – California State Assemblymember, Secretary of State of California and the namesake of Tuttletown, California
- Edwin G. Waite – California State Assemblymember and Secretary of State of California
- Albert Maver Winn – first City Council of Sacramento and chosen as President (ex officio Mayor), California State Adjutant General and founder of the Native Sons of the Golden West
- Gen. George Wright – General in the Union Army of the American Civil War
- Lt. Thomas F. Wright – son of Gen. George Wright, was killed while fighting in the Modoc War

== See also ==
- New Helvetia Cemetery (active c. 1845 to 1912), the first cemetery in the city of Sacramento
