= 2024 Sacramento City Council election =

Local election in California

- March 5 (primary); November 5 (runoff)

4 of 8 seats on Sacramento City Council

The 2024 Sacramento City Council election took place on March 5, 2024, to elect four of the eight seats of the Sacramento City Council, with runoff elections taking place on November 5, 2024. Runoffs only occurred if no candidate receives more than 50% of the votes cast in the contest. Local elections in California are officially nonpartisan. Each councilmember is elected to a four-year term, and does not have any term limits.

== District 2 ==
Sean Loloee was elected to the 2nd district in 2020 in the runoff with 56.3% of the vote. He later resigned from office in January 2024 after being indicted on criminal charges related to fraud schemes. Incumbent Shoun Thao was appointed by the City Council in March 2024 for the remainder of the term. Thao was eligible for a full term, but chose not to run.

=== Endorsements ===
Roger Dickinson

Labor unions

- California Nurses Association
- National Nurses United
- Operating Engineers Local 3
- Sacramento Central Labor Council
- SEIU Local 1021
- Sheet Metal Workers' Local 104
- Teamsters Joint Council 7

Organizations

- CAIR Action
- Fem Dems of Sacramento
- Gun Sense Voter
- Harry S. Truman Democratic Club
- Justice Opportunity Liberty Politico (JOLPOL)
- Los Rios College Federation of Teachers
- Our Revolution
- Our Rightful Place (runoff election)
- Planned Parenthood Advocates Mar Monte
- Sacramento Latino Democratic Club
- Sierra Club Mother Lode Chapter
- Wellstone Progressive Democrats/Our Revolution Sacramento

Newspapers

- The Sacramento Bee

Political organizations

- Sacramento County Democratic Party
- Sacramento County Young Democrats
Stephen Walton

Organizations

- Elect Good People
- Metro PAC
- Sacramento Association of Realtors
- Sacramento Democratic Alliance
Veronica Smith

Organizations

- Our Rightful Place (primary endorsement)
Kim Davie

Individuals

- Daniel Hahn, Sacramento Police Chief

=== Results ===
2024 Sacramento City Council 2nd district election
Primary election
Candidate	Votes	%
Roger Dickinson	2,587	44.7
Stephen Walton	933	16.1
Kim Davie	629	10.9
Veronica Smith	579	10.0
Ramona Landeros	311	5.4
Daryl Collins	281	4.9
Penelope Larry	238	4.1
Alicia Bledsoe	150	2.6
Mary L. Russell	76	1.3
Total votes	5,784	100.0
General election
Roger Dickinson	8,089	60.7
Stephen Walton	5,238	39.3
Total votes	13,327	100.0

== District 4 ==
Incumbent Katie Valenzuela was elected to the 4th district in 2020 in the primary with 53.3% of the vote. She was eligible for reelection.

=== Endorsements ===
Katie Valenzuela

Labor unions

- California Nurses Association
- National Nurses United
- National Union of Healthcare Workers
- SEIU Local 1021
- SEIU UHW
- SEIU Local 2015
- Sheet Metal Workers' Local 104
- Teamsters Joint Council 7

Organizations

- California Democratic Renters' Council
- Courage California
- Davis College Democrats
- Fem Dems of Sacramento
- Harry S. Truman Democratic Club (dual endorsement)
- Our Revolution
- Our Rightful Place
- Queer Democrats of Sacramento
- Run for Something
- Sacramento Central Labor Council
- Sacramento Latino Democratic Club
- Wellstone Progressive Democrats/Our Revolution Sacramento

Political organizations

- Sacramento County Democratic Party
- Sacramento County Young Democrats
- Working Families Party

Individuals

- Flojaune Cofer, Sacramento mayoral candidate for 2024
Phil Pluckebaum

Organizations

- Harry S. Truman Democratic Club (dual endorsement)
- Sacramento Association of Realtors
- Sacramento Democratic Alliance

Labor unions

- Operating Engineers Local 3

Individuals

- Steve Hansen, Sacramento mayoral candidate for 2024

=== Results ===
2024 Sacramento City Council 4th district election
Primary election
Candidate	Votes	%
Phil Plukebaum	9,366	50.6
Katie Valenzuela (incumbent)	8,542	46.2
J. Marilynn Mackey Meyer	593	3.2
Total votes	18,501	100.0

== District 6 ==
Incumbent Eric Guerra was initially elected to the 6th district in the 2015 special primary election, and was subsequently reelected in 2016 and 2020. He was eligible for reelection.

=== Endorsements ===
Eric Guerra

Organizations

- Harry S. Truman Democratic Club
- Metro PAC
- Sacramento Association of Realtors
- Sacramento Central Labor Council
- Sacramento Democratic Alliance
- Sacramento Latino Democratic Club

Newspapers

- The Sacramento Bee

Political organizations

- Sacramento County Democratic Party

Labor unions

- Operating Engineers Local 3
- National Union of Healthcare Workers
- Sheet Metal Workers' Local 104
- Teamsters Joint Council 7
Katherine "KC" Schuft

Organizations

- Our Rightful Place

=== Results ===
2024 Sacramento City Council 6th district election
Primary election
Candidate	Votes	%
Eric Guerra (incumbent)	8,308	67.4
Kevin Rooney	1,883	15.3
Katherine "KC" Schuft	1,591	12.9
David Drelinger	551	4.5
Total votes	12,333	100.0

== District 8 ==
Incumbent Mai Vang was elected to the 8th district in 2020 in the runoff with 52.1% of the vote. She was eligible for reelection.

=== Endorsements ===
Mai Vang

Organizations

- Courage California
- Our Revolution
- Our Rightful Place
- Queer Democrats of Sacramento
- Sacramento Central Labor Council
- Sacramento Latino Democratic Club
- Wellstone Progressive Democrats/Our Revolution Sacramento

Newspapers

- The Sacramento Bee

Political organizations

- Sacramento County Democratic Party
- Sacramento County Young Democrats
- Working Families Party

Labor unions

- National Union of Healthcare Workers
- Operating Engineers Local 3
- SEIU Local 1021
- SEIU UHW
- Sheet Metal Workers' Local 104

=== Results ===
2024 Sacramento City Council 8th district election
Primary election
Candidate	Votes	%
Mai Vang (incumbent)	6,017	100.0
Total votes	6,017	100.0
