= Demas Strong =

American politician

Demas Strong (April 22, 1820 – November 9, 1893) was an American businessman, lawyer, and politician.

== Life ==
Strong was born on April 22, 1820, in Middletown, Connecticut, the son of Davis Swift Strong and Clarissa Braddock.

Strong was apprenticed to a gold watch case manufacturer in New York City, New York, from 1834 to 1837. He then spent several years as a clerk in a wholesale store in New York. Initially a Democrat, he joined the Free Soil Party and was a member of the 1848 Free Soil National Convention. In 1849, he moved to California and established a trading post in Big Bar, (Note: There are three places in California called Big Bar, and the sources do not say which one this was. However, Mokelumne Hill (aka Big Bar) was one of the richest mining towns during the California Gold Rush of 1848-1855, and neither of the other two seems ever to have been a major settlement.) then another one in Coloma, and then building a store in San Francisco. He then moved to Sacramento, where he was a merchant, erected several stores and dwellings, and bought town lots. He was a city alderman, serving as president of the City Council. Following the Squatters' riot, when Mayor Hardin Bigelow was shot, Strong became the city's acting mayor. In December 1850, he moved to Brooklyn, closing up his California businesses in 1856. By that point, he became an active Republican. He studied law while working as a merchant's clerk and began working as a lawyer in Brooklyn.

Strong was a member of the Williamsburgh Board of Education, and he was one of the appointed commissioners to arrange the consolidation of that city with Brooklyn. He spent five years as a member of the Brooklyn Common Council. In 1863, he was elected to the New York State Senate as a Republican, representing New York's 2nd State Senate district (the 1st, 2nd, 3rd, 4th, 5th, 7th, 11th, 13th, and 19th wards of Brooklyn). He served in the Senate in 1864 and 1865. While in the Senate, he wrote a bill that established the New York State Institution for the Blind in Batavia. He later became president of the Eastern District Hospital trustees.

In 1841, Strong married Jane A. Leaycraft. Their children were Richard Polk, Julia, William Davis, Clarrise, Joseph Lewis, George Jesse, Grace, Jeanie, Demas Swift, Morris Braddock, and Susie.

Strong died in Atlantic City, New Jersey, where he was staying for health reasons, on November 9, 1893. He was buried in the family burial plot in Middle Haddam, Connecticut.

== Footnotes ==
New York State Senate
Preceded by Jesse C. Smith	New York State Senate; 2nd District; 1864–1865	Succeeded by Henry R. Pierson
