= Squatters' riot =

Coordinates: 38.5824°N 121.5014°W

Date	August 8, 1850 – August 15, 1850
Location	In and around Sacramento, Unorganized territory
Result	Inconclusive

Belligerents
Government of Sacramento	Squatters

Commanders and leaders
Mayor Hardin Bigelow; Sheriff Joseph McKinney †	Dr. Charles L. Robinson; Joseph Maloney †

Casualties and losses
3 dead At least 1 wounded	2 dead
- 2 civilians in crossfire
- A total of six were wounded.

The squatters' riot was an uprising and conflict that took place between squatting settlers and the government of Sacramento, California (then an unorganized territory annexed after the Treaty of Guadalupe Hidalgo) in August 1850 concerning the lands that John Sutter controlled in the region and the extremely high prices that speculators set for land that they had acquired from Sutter. The influx of squatters was a consequence of the 1848 California Gold Rush; when courts began to take legal action against squatters in the area, the squatters mobilized under Dr. Charles L. Robinson and Joseph Maloney and challenged mayor Hardin Bigelow and sheriff Joseph McKinney; the conflict was ultimately resolved, and the speculation in Sacramento ended as a result.

== Background ==
The California Gold Rush, which began in 1848, attracted thousands of gold seekers to the Sacramento Valley region after flakes of gold were discovered at a sawmill owned by John Sutter, Sr. in Coloma. Founding an embarcadero on the confluence of the American and Sacramento Rivers to facilitate trade, the Gold Rush made Sutter disillusioned and he replaced himself with his son as tender of business affairs in Sutter's New Helvetia. Sutter's temporary succession by his son gave Sutter, Jr. the power and opportunity to develop the embarcadero into a settlement that he dubbed "Sacramento City" with his partner, Samuel Brannan from San Francisco in the south. However, even after the hype that accompanied the Gold Rush began to settle down, settlers continued to move into Sacramento City, attracted by the trade that continued to bustle along its location on the Sacramento and American.

Settlers who had recently arrived in California found that unclaimed land in key locations was difficult to find and possess. Of the 14 million acres (57,000 km^{2}) of claimed land in California, eight hundred people held the deed to differing quantities of this land. With no convenient location in which they could stay, new arrivals who could not afford lodging in the city squatted on claimed land circling the settlement. Contentious squatters challenged the right of John Sutter's Mexican-era claim to the Sacramento Valley, as his possessions encompassed much of the Sacramento region.

== Prelude to conflict ==
The squatters were roused initially by an October 1849 lawsuit filed against a logger named Z. M. Chapman, who had constructed a log cabin nearby Sutter's Fort on Priest, Lee, & Company-owned land. When the commercial institution could not pool sufficient evidence displaying their ownership of the land, Chapman extended his claim, challenging at first Sutter's grants and later on all city-owned land. Charles L. Robinson approved of Chapman's actions and built his own shack on another's private land. The squatting settlers organized the Sacramento City Settlers Organization; Robinson became the group's president.

Headed by Samuel Brannan, landowners in the area spoke against Robinson's actions and convinced the Sacramento City Council to issue a document that permitted the destruction of Robinson's property. However, a major January flood washed through and destroyed much of Sacramento City, scattering most of the squatters in the vicinity of the city center. This temporarily dealt with the problem. Many former squatters headed north to placer mines in search of gold, although after the floods had ended and the former squatters realized that there was little gold to be had, hundreds returned to the city.

The settlers who supported government recognition of squatters' rights began to host public meetings in the spring of 1850, at which they swore to defend their lands if confronted. A "Law and Order Association" was formed and an irregular militia was organized to challenge the speculators who charged high prices for the land they had purchased from Sutter, as well as Sutter himself. Tension in the city began to increase after a group of speculators had a squatter-built and squatter-owned fence demolished.

In May 1850, the newly elected judge of Sacramento County, named E. J. Willis, charged a squatter named John T. Madden with unlawful occupation. When the court ruled against Madden on August 8, squatter-sympathetic settlers charged the speculators with "brute force" in handbills distributed across the city. The squatters chose to rally under Dr. Charles L. Robinson, who became the movement's de facto leader; Robinson worked with future Sacramento Bee editor James McClatchy to found the Settlers and Miners Tribune, which attacked the land monopoly that stifled new immigration to the city. He also enlisted Joseph Maloney to head a company of squatters in case military action was required. Protracting peace for an additional day, mayor Hardin Bigelow promised that writs for arrest against those who joined Robinson would not be issued.

However, the next day on August 13, a writ of restitution was issued of the locale at which John T. Madden had stayed as a squatter prior to his trial; the writ of restitution called forth James McClatchy and another Free Soil advocate named Richard Moran. Along with others who had opposed the sheriff's decision to execute the writ, McClatchy and Moran were jailed aboard a ship that served as the city's prison brig, the La Grange. On August 14, Maloney and Robinson mobilized their military force of approximately forty or fifty and marched through downtown Sacramento, intent on freeing the Madden residence from government confiscation; however, Hardin Bigelow believed that they were marching towards the La Grange to free McClatchy and Moran, and mobilized a military force. Fearing a full-scale uprising, Bigelow marched with his fellow settlers and confronted Maloney and Robinson at the corner of streets Fourth and J.

== Battles ==
The details of the following fight were not clear, although the local Placer Times worked to document the battle. At the confrontation in downtown Sacramento, Hardin Bigelow at first ordered the squatters to stand down and relinquish their arms; shooting began instead. Hardin Bigelow was severely injured and Charles Robinson was wounded. City assessor J. W. Woodland, Joseph Maloney, a squatter named Jesse Morgan, and two civilian bystanders were killed.

General Albert Maver Winn, who was the head of the Sacramento City Council at the time, ordered 500 militiamen towards the city and declared a state of martial law until the matter could be resolved. Meanwhile, as Bigelow recovered from his wounds, Joseph McKinney led a party of twenty men and attacked a squatter camp at Brighton, a settlement to the east of Sacramento. Although McKinney and three of the squatters were killed, the conflict wound down and ended.

== Aftermath ==
Hardin Bigelow was unable to resume his duties as mayor, and headed south to San Francisco to recuperate. He was replaced by Demas Strong, the president of the Common Council. Charles Robinson, although tried for murder, remained extremely popular with the populace of Sacramento, and was elected to the California State Legislature while still in prison, after supporters placed his name on the ballot. Robinson also became the first governor of the state of Kansas. McClatchy and Moran were released from the La Grange two days after the Squatters Riot ended, and the speculation that moved the squatters to action began to disappear, although the federal government agreed to uphold Sutter's pre-American grant and the squatters lost the legal battle.
