= Benjamin B. Redding =

American politician

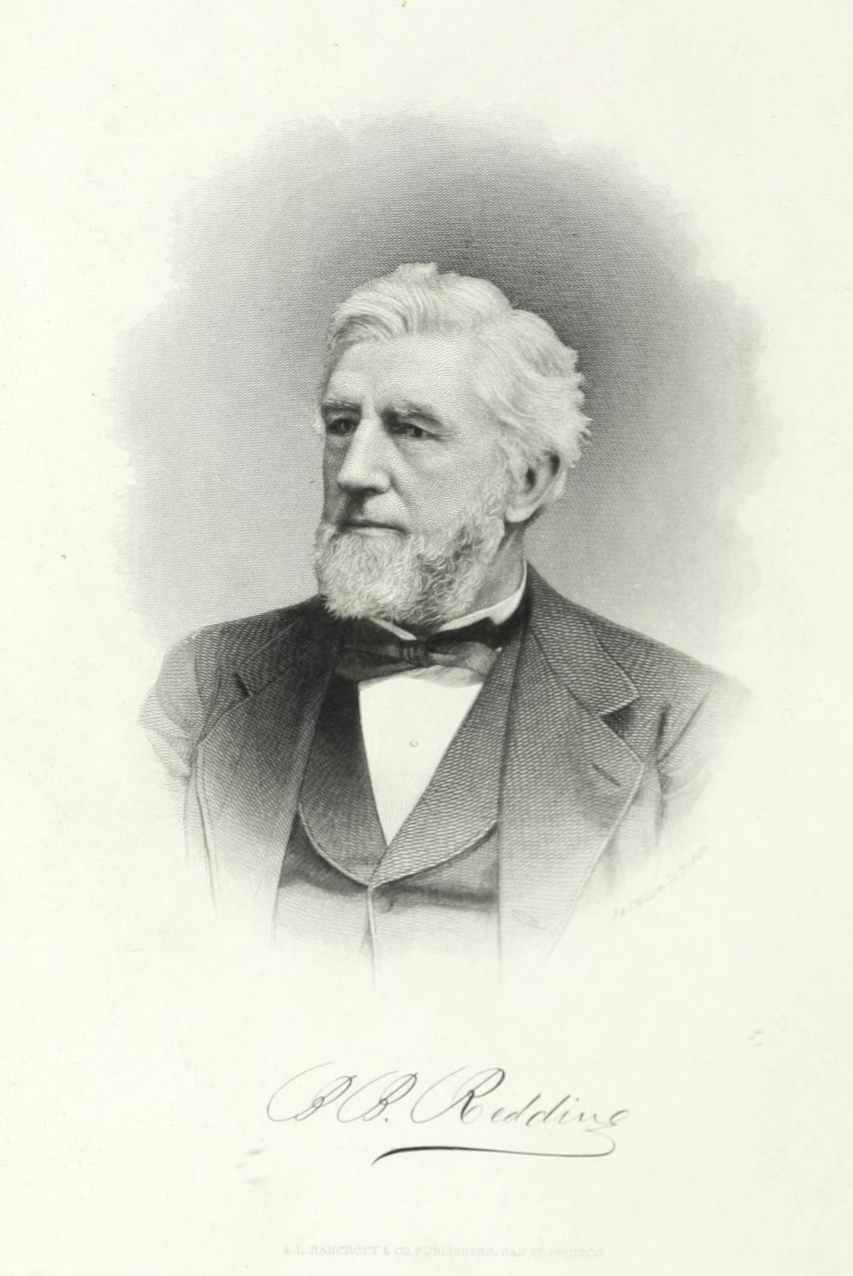

9th Secretary of State of California
- In office 1863–1867
- Governor: Leland Stanford; Frederick Low
- Preceded by: A. A. H. Tuttle
- Succeeded by: Henry L. Nichols

9th Mayor of Sacramento
- In office 1856–1857
- Preceded by: James Lawrence English
- Succeeded by: Joseph Palmer Dyer

Member of the California State Assembly from the 15th district
- In office 1853–1854
- Preceded by: Charles S. Fairfax
- Succeeded by: Charles W. Dannals

Personal details
- Born: Benjamin Barnard Redding; January 17, 1824 Yarmouth, Colony of Nova Scotia
- Died: August 21, 1882 (aged 58) San Francisco, California.
- Spouse: Mary P.

Benjamin Barnard Redding (January 17, 1824 – August 21, 1882) was a British North America-born politician of California; after joining the gold rush as a young man, he served in the state house, as mayor of Sacramento, Secretary of State for California, and Fish Commissioner. He also worked as a journalist and editor in northern California and Sacramento. As a businessman, he worked as a land agent with the Central Pacific Railroad, which named the town of Redding, California after him.

== Biography ==
Born in Yarmouth, Nova Scotia in 1824, Redding was educated at Yarmouth Academy. In 1840 at the age of 16, he immigrated to Boston, Massachusetts, where he worked as a clerk. He entered the retail grocery and ship chandlery business in 1843.

In the 1840s he married Mary Prescott Putnam (born 1820) from Boston; their children were William Redding (born ca. 1848 in Massachusetts); J. Albert Redding (born ca. 1850 in Massachusetts). The family later joined him in California after his first mining work was finished. His sons George H. Redding (born in California 1856; and Joseph D. Redding (born 1859 in Sacramento) were both born there.

In 1849, Redding organized a company of young men and sailed from Yarmouth for the gold rush in California. They reached San Francisco on May 12, 1850. Redding went to the Yuba River diggings and afterward to the Pittsburg bar, working as a mining laborer. He subsequently was associate editor of the Shasta Journal, was employed in drawing up papers for the sale of claims, and acted as arbitrator.

Having established a local reputation, Redding was elected as a member of the California State Assembly, 1853–1854, from Yuba and Sierra counties. During the session, he wrote for the San Joaquin Republican and Sacramento's Democratic State Journal, of which he was an editor and proprietor. His family joined him from Massachusetts when he could provide a more settled life, and his two younger sons were both born in California.

In 1856, Redding was elected mayor of Sacramento. From 1863 to 1867, he served as Secretary of State, appointed by the governor.

With a change in administrations, Redding left state government in 1868, becoming a land agent of the Central Pacific Railroad. When the Central Pacific reached Shasta County in the summer of 1872, the railroad company named the town of Redding, California, in his honor.

In other public service, Redding was appointed a regent of the University of California to fill the unexpired term of Regent Frank M. Pixley, 1880-1882. He was reappointed in 1882. He was a member of the California Academy of Sciences, and of the Geographical Society of the Pacific. He was interested in all scientific work, especially in the paleontology of the coast. He collected numerous prehistoric and aboriginal relics, which he presented to the museum of the academy. He contributed a large number of papers to various California journals.

He was also appointed as California Fish Commissioner, holding this office at the time of his death.

Benjamin B. Redding died at age 58 of apoplexy (stroke) in San Francisco. His funeral service took place at the First Congregational Church on August 23, 1882, with a large number of friends and acquaintances present, including a delegation from the offices of the Central Pacific Railroad Company and the Academy of Sciences, besides a number of regents from the State University.

Redding is interred in the Sacramento Historic City Cemetery in Sacramento, California.

Preceded by Charles S. Fairfax	California State Assemblyman, 15th District; 1853-1854	Succeeded by Charles W. Dannals

Preceded by James L. English	Mayor of Sacramento, California; 1856	Succeeded by Joseph P. Dyer

Preceded by A. A. H. Tuttle	Secretary of State of California; 1863–1867	Succeeded by Henry L. Nichols
