= Livermore v. Waite =

1894 California Supreme Court ruling

- Supreme Court of California

Decided March 28, 1894,
- Full case name: Horatio P. Livermore v. E. G. Waite, Secretary of State, etc.
- Citation(s): 102 Cal. 113 (1894), 117, 36 P. 424

Case history
- Prior history: Appeal from a judgment of the Superior Court of Sacramento County.

Holding
- Constitutional amendments must be enacted in a manner explicitly provided for by the California Constitution, while constitutional revisions only must follow the United States Constitution.

Case opinions
- Majority: Harrison, joined by Beatty, Fitzgerald, Dehaven
- Concurrence: Garoutte, joined by Mcfarland, Paterson

Laws applied
- Cal. Const. Amend. XVIII

Livermore v. Waite is an 1894 California Supreme Court ruling that limits the power of the legislature in making amendments to the California Constitution by ruling that the power to change to the constitution cannot be delegated to any individual, as the sovereign power rests with the people.

The decision was met with the full concurrence of the court, with the majority opinion authored by Justice Harrison and the concurring opinion authored by Justice Paterson.

== Background ==
In the session of congress prior to this case, congress approved by a two-thirds majority in each house, an amendment to the constitution changing section 1 of article XX of the constitution to change the capital of California from Sacramento to San Jose pending a two-thirds approval by the electorate, a donation of ten acres in San Jose to the state, and one million dollars for the move. It also authorized the Governor, Secretary of State, and Attorney General to approve the site and upon approval and transferring the one million dollars into the state treasury, the legislature would provide for the erection of the building, and the removal of the capital at Sacramento.

As a taxpayer and citizen, Horatio Livermore brought action against the secretary of state to restrain from publishing in the statutes, and sending to the county clerks of the state, the proposed senate constitutional amendment because he felt that congress had out stepped its authority in making this amendment, and that it would be inoperative if approved by the people. This would result in an improper expenditure of public money.
The lower court ruled in the plaintiff Livermore's favor, to which the defendant Waite appealed and the Supreme Court affirmed the decision, finding the amendment to be unconstitutional.

== Opinion ==
The constitution can be changed in two methods, a revision to the constitution by delegates in a convention with the purpose of revising the entire document, in which the limitations are set only by the United States Constitution.

The second is by adoption by the people of more limited amendments that have been passed two-thirds majority of the legislature.

The court provided a definition under Article XVIII of an amendment and a revision:

The very term "constitution" implies an instrument of a permanent and abiding nature, and the provisions contained therein for its revision indicate the will of the people that the underlying principles upon which it rests, as well as the substantial entirety of the instrument, shall be of a like permanent and abiding nature. On the other hand, the significance of the term "amendment" implies such an addition or change within the lines of the original instrument as will effect an improvement, or better carry out the purpose for which it was framed.

The court decided that by making the amendment conditional pending the approval was of the new location of the capital by the Governor, Secretary of State, and Attorney General, their votes superseded the vote of the people, and that in effect, the vote of the people would was simply a manner in which to send it to a higher power for approval. This amendment would not become operational on popular approval, but on conditions not specified there. This meant that the proposition was not passed in accordance with either method in the Constitution for amendment or revision, therefore rendering it unconstitutional.

== Significance ==
In August 1999, the Alaska Supreme Court used the ruling in Livermore v. Waite in the case Bess v. Ulmer noting "it is helpful to look to the law of California, a state which has considered the issue carefully over a period of nearly one hundred years. A line of California Supreme Court cases, beginning with Livermore v. Waite, has outlined the parameters of the procedures for constitutional change in that state."
