= Jesse C. Smith =

American politician

Jesse C. Smith (June 18, 1808 Butternuts, Otsego County, New York - July 11, 1888 Brooklyn, Kings County, New York) was an American lawyer and politician from New York.

== Life ==
He graduated from Union College in 1832. Then he studied law, was admitted to the bar, and commenced practice in Brooklyn. He was Surrogate of Kings County from 1850 to 1854. He was active in the State Militia, attaining the rank of colonel.

He was a member of the New York State Senate (2nd D.) in 1862 and 1863. Afterwards he joined the Union Army with the 139th New York Volunteer Infantry Regiment, and commanded as a brigadier general the 11th Brigade at the Battle of Gettysburg.

He "was stricken with paralysis," and died at his home at 143 Willow Street, in Brooklyn.

== Sources ==
- The New York Civil List compiled by Franklin Benjamin Hough, Stephen C. Hutchins and Edgar Albert Werner (1870; pg. 443)
- Biographical Sketches of the State Officers and the Members of the Legislature of the State of New York in 1862 and '63 by William D. Murphy (1863; pg. 108f)
- OBITUARY; GEN. JESSE C. SMITH in NYT on July 12, 1888
- Historical Register and Dictionary of the United States Army by Francis Bernard Heitman (Vol. 1, pg. 900)

New York State Senate
Preceded by Thomas A. Gardiner	New York State Senate; 2nd District; 1862–1863	Succeeded by Demas Strong
