= The Nevada Journal =

Defunct California newspaper (1851–1862

- "Neutral in Nothing—Independent in Everything."
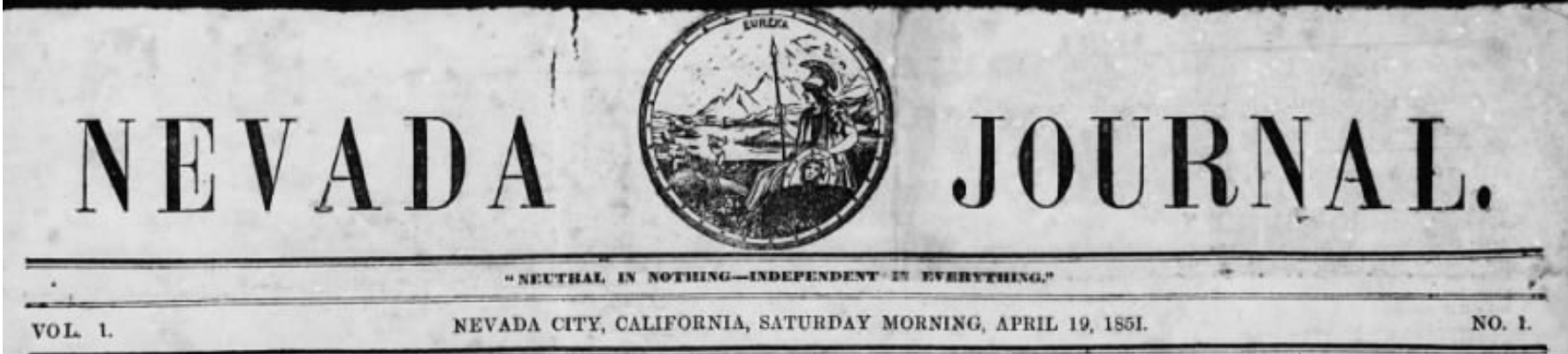
- Vol. 1, No. 1 masthead (April 19, 1851)
- Type: Weekly; semi-weekly
- Founded: April 19, 1851
- Ceased publication: 1862
- Language: English
- City: Nevada City, California, U.S.
- ISSN: 2642-3677
- OCLC number: 10791503

The Nevada Journal (originally, Nevada Journal) was a newspaper based in Nevada City, California. Nevada City was the first city in the California Gold Rush's northern mines (Note: Historian Theodore H. Hittell described the dividing line between the Northern Mines and Southern Mines as "ordinarily understood" to be the ridge separating the Cosumnes and Mokelumne rivers, "but there was nothing very definite about the line of demarcation".) at which the press was located. The Nevada Journal was the first newspaper published in Nevada County, the second paper started in the mines of California, and one of the earliest published in the mountains of the U.S. state of California. In the final report on the 1880 US Census, a section on California's history of the press includes one data point for each year from 1846 through 1865, the data point for 1851 being the establishment of the Nevada Journal.

== History ==
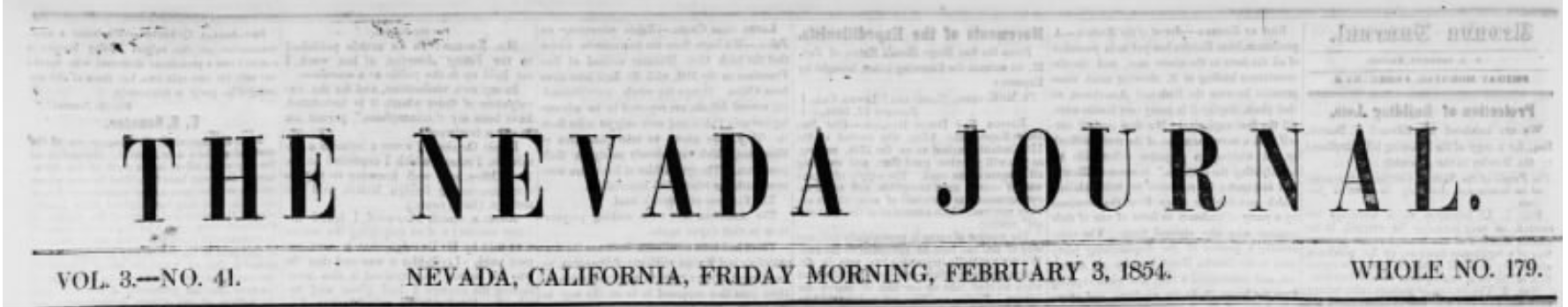
The Nevada Journal (February 3, 1854)

The Journal was a weekly paper for a time after its establishment on April 19, 1851. Four short-lived comic papers followed quickly in the northern mines district. The Journal became a semi-weekly for about six months; then it became a weekly again afterward. The first issue was published on April 19 (or 21), 1851, by Warren Baxter Ewer.

Aaron A. Sargent's earliest of his significant contributions to the town began in July 1851 when he offered to help set type and write articles for the paper. The Journal suspended publication in 1861, but was revived soon after and published another year and a half.

In politics, the Journal was a Whig paper. After William M. Stewart was named the city's District Attorney in November 1852, it was thought expedient for the Democrats to also have a newspaper. Stewart bought a press which had been brought to town to start the Democratic paper, and placed it in charge of Robert Davidge. Stewart told Davidge when they started in with the paper to get into no controversy with the Journal.

In July 1855, the Journal began the advocacy of "American principles". Since the election of 1856 closed, the Journal did not include a political party at the head of its columns. It advocated for Douglas in 1858. In the fire of July 19, 1856, the Journal establishment was entirely destroyed, but was started again in two weeks, with the loss of but two issues. In the December 2, 1859, issue the paper condemned local gamblers, apparently including Henry Plummer. On July 1, 1859, the first newspaper notice of the Comstock Lode discovery was published in the Journal; soon thereafter a great number of persons started for the new fields, and it was estimated that within the next two years, two-thirds of all the male adults of Nevada County had gone over to the silver region. In the October 5, 1860, issue a writer made the distinction between popular and squatter sovereignty.

== People ==
Ewer was the paper's first editor (1851). He was succeeded in the proprietorship by Alban & De Courcey; the latter person, Henry ("Harry") A. DeCourcey, editor. Then Alban & Sargent became proprietors, the latter, Aaron A. Sargent, assuming the editorship (1852-55). Sargent & Budd next succeeded as proprietors, the former, E.R. Budd, continuing editor (1854). Then came the firm of Budd & Skelton, the former editor. Sargent & Skelton came next as proprietors; Sargent, editor. Then N. P. Brown came into the firm, which was known by the name of Sargent & Co. Sargent retired in 1855, and the firm became composed of E.G. Waite, N. P. Brown, H. M. Fuller and Jno. P. Skelton; Waite, editor; who continued in the business until the fire of 1856, when Fuller and Skelton retired, and Sargent again came into the firm; remaining, however, but three months, since which time the concern has been owned and carried on by Brown & Waite. During the winter of 1855-56, Judge Addison Niles and Judge Thomas Bard McFarland edited the Journal, for Waite, who was then serving a term in the state legislature. At one time, Rev. Benjamin Brierly, a Baptist preacher, also served as editor of the Journal.
