= Jabez Turner =

American politician

Mayor of Sacramento
- In office 1878–1880
- Preceded by: Christopher Green
- Succeeded by: John Q. Brown

Personal details
- Born: 25 October 1828 Warkton, Northamptonshire
- Died: 12 March 1899 Sacramento, California
- Political party: State Workingmen's ticket

Jabez Turner (1828–1899) was a mayor of Sacramento, California.

== Biography ==
He was born on October 25, 1828, the seventh of fourteen children of Puritan farmers George and Amy Turner in the village of Warkton near Kettering in Northamptonshire. Originally apprenticed as a carpenter, he left England for America with his wife Elizabeth in 1852 and worked in rail-road shops in Syracuse, Hamilton, Grand Rapids, Torch Lake and Sturgeon Bay, before migrating to California via the Panama Canal in 1864, where he was employed in the wood-working section of the San Francisco and Alameda Railroad (later part of the Central Pacific Railroad Company) until 1871, when he was transferred to the shops in Sacramento.

He was elected mayor of that city in March 1878, on what was known as the State Workingmen's ticket, and served for three years; his administration was a progressive but non-partisan one, with many reforms and improvements being put in operation under his direction. He later served as a director of the Sacramento Free Library and the Sacramento Building & Loan Association.

Turner lost his first two wives to illness, and was survived by his third, Nancy Phelps Turner. He had seven children. Turner is interred in the Sacramento Historic City Cemetery.
