= A. A. H. Tuttle =

American politician

Anson A. H. Tuttle

Secretary of State of California
- In office 1863–1863
- Governor: Leland Stanford
- Preceded by: William H. Weeks
- Succeeded by: Benjamin B. Redding

California State Assemblyman, 7th District
- In office 1858–1859
- Preceded by: George W. Thomas
- Succeeded by: Samuel M. Buck

Personal details
- Born: 1820 or 1821
- Died: 7 September 1866
- Party: Republican

Anson Akenside Hull Tuttle (1820/1821 – 7 September 1866) was an American tavern keeper, judge and Republican politician. Tuttletown, California, was named for him.

He built a log cabin in 1848 in what would become Tuolumne County, California. He was a member of the California State Assembly, 1858–59. He was Secretary of State of California in 1863. In 1866 he was California State Treasurer.

Tuttle died at the age of 45. He is interred in the Sacramento Historic City Cemetery in Sacramento, California.

Preceded by George W. Thomas	California State Assemblyman, 7th District; 1858–1859	Succeeded by Samuel M. Buck

Preceded by William H. Weeks	Secretary of State of California; 1863	Succeeded by Benjamin B. Redding
