= George B. Cosby =

Confederate States Army general

George Blake Cosby
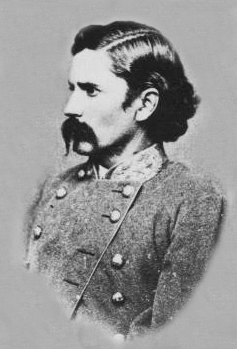
- Brig. Gen. George B. Cosby
- Born: January 19, 1830; Louisville, Kentucky, U.S.
- Died: June 29, 1909 (aged 79); Oakland, California, U.S.
- Burial place: Sacramento Historic City Cemetery, Sacramento, California
- Military career
- Allegiance: United States of America; Confederate States of America
- Branch: United States Army; Confederate States Army
- Service years: 1852–1861 (USA); 1861–1865 (CSA)
- Rank: Captain (USA); Brigadier General (CSA)
- Units: 2nd United States Cavalry; United States Mounted Riflemen
- Commands: Cosby's Cavalry Brigade
- Conflicts: American Civil War
- Other work: Farmer, sutler, engineer, government official

George Blake Cosby (January 19, 1830 – June 29, 1909) was a Confederate general during the American Civil War. He was an 1852 graduate of the United States Military Academy and served in the United States Army until May 10, 1861. After the war, he farmed in California, worked as a sutler in Oregon and held several government positions.

== Early life ==
George Blake Cosby was born on January 19, 1830, in Louisville, Kentucky. He graduated 17th of 43 in the 1852 class of the United States Military Academy at West Point, New York. He was assigned as a brevet Second Lieutenant to the U.S. Mounted Riflemen Regiment on July 1, 1852, and was appointed a full Second Lieutenant on September 16, 1852. Cosby was wounded fighting Native Americans (Indians) at Lake Trinidad, Texas, on May 9, 1854. Cosby transferred to the 2nd U.S. Cavalry Regiment on March 3, 1855. He was promoted to First Lieutenant on May 1, 1856, and to captain on May 8, 1861. He taught cavalry tactics at West Point before his resignation to join the Confederate States Army. Cosby resigned on May 10, 1861, to join the Confederate Army.

== American Civil War ==
On May 16, 1861, George B. Cosby was appointed Captain and assistant adjutant general in the regular army of the Confederate States.

On June 20, 1861, he was promoted to Major with the same duties. He also became assistant adjutant general of the Army of the Peninsula until the following month.

Between November 9, 1861, and February 16, 1862, he was assistant adjutant general and chief of staff for Brigadier General Simon B. Buckner. As such, Cosby brought the note that opened negotiations for the surrender of Fort Donelson, Tennessee, on February 16, 1862, from Brigadier General Buckner to Union Brigadier General Ulysses S. Grant. Cosby was captured as a result of the surrender of Fort Donelson. He was not exchanged until August 15, 1862.

Upon his return to duty in August 1862, Cosby was appointed as the Colonel of cavalry. In October 1862, he was appointed chief of staff of the Army of Mississippi and on December 23, 1862, chief of staff for the District of the Gulf, Department No. 2. Cosby was promoted to the Brigadier General on January 20, 1863 and given command of a cavalry brigade in the Department of Mississippi and East Louisiana. In February and March 1863, his brigade was assigned to the Army of Tennessee. They served under General Joseph E. Johnston in the campaign around Jackson, Mississippi, which was planned to relieve the Siege of Vicksburg. In March 1863, Cosby's brigade was assigned to the division of Brigadier General William H. Jackson in the Army of Mississippi and then to the Department of Mississippi and East Louisiana. The brigade was assigned to Major General Earl Van Dorn in August and September, 1863, then returned to the Department of Mississippi and East Louisiana, which became the Department of Alabama, Mississippi, and East Louisiana. While under Van Dorn's command, Cosby fought in the Battle of Thompson's Station, Tennessee.

In February 1864, Cosby and his brigade were assigned to the Department of Southwest Virginia and East Tennessee until September 1864, when they were assigned to the Department of West Virginia and East Tennessee until the end of the war. Cosby had between 2,000 and 4,000 men under his command at various times during this assignment. Cosby was paroled in Kentucky in May 1865. He had disbanded his men when he heard about the surrender of the Army of Northern Virginia.

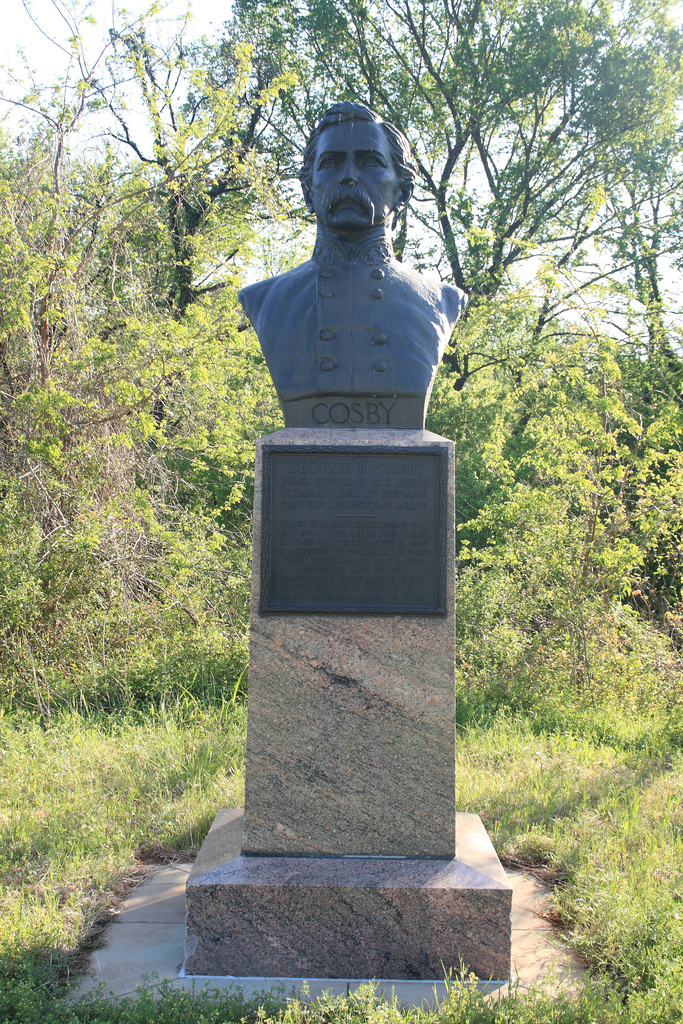
Bronze bust of Gen. Cosby at Vicksburg

== Aftermath ==
After the Civil War, Cosby moved to Butte County, California, where he was a farmer. For a period of time, he was also a sutler in Oregon. He held several government positions, including Secretary of the Board of State Engineers and member of the West Point Board of Visitors. Cosby also lived in Sacramento, California, where he served as receiver of funds in the federal land office.

General Cosby died by suicide on June 29, 1909, in Oakland, California, allegedly due to continuing pain from his old war wounds. George Blake Cosby was buried at City Cemetery in Sacramento.

== See also ==
- List of American Civil War generals (Confederate)
