= James L. English =

American politician (1813–1889)

8th Mayor of Sacramento
- In office 1855–1855
- Preceded by: R. P. Johnson
- Succeeded by: Benjamin Barnard Redding

4th Treasurer of California
- In office 1857–1858
- Governor: J. Neely Johnson
- Preceded by: Henry Bates
- Succeeded by: Thomas Findley

Personal details
- Born: James Lawrence English; June 5, 1813 Philadelphia, Pennsylvania
- Died: May 29, 1889 (aged 75) Sacramento, California

James Lawrence English (June 5, 1813 – May 29, 1889) was an American lawyer and Democratic politician.

Born in Philadelphia, Pennsylvania, English lived in Pettis County, Missouri, prior to moving to Sacramento, California, in 1853. Shortly after his arrival, he became associated with Philip Leget Edwards in the Sacramento law firm of Edwards and English.

English was Mayor of Sacramento in 1855. From 1857 to 1858, he was California State Treasurer. He also served as a delegate to the Democratic National Convention in 1876.

James L. English died at age 76 in Sacramento. He is interred in the Sacramento Historic City Cemetery.

Political offices
| Preceded by R. P. Johnson | Mayor of Sacramento, California; 1855 | Succeeded by Benjamin B. Redding |
| Preceded by Henry Bates | Treasurer of California; 1857–1858 | Succeeded by Thomas Findley |
