= Christopher Green (Sacramento mayor) =

American politician

- Occupation(s): Mayor and first trustee of Sacramento, California
- Years active: 1872–1877

Christopher Green was an American politician. He served as mayor and first trustee of Sacramento, California, from years 1872 to 1877. He was Sacramento's 14th mayor and its 12th elected mayor. Green was associated with the Republican Party and had heavy support from the Central Pacific Railway Company. Jabez Turner succeeded Green as mayor.

When the Central Pacific moved their headquarters out of Sacramento, Green was one of the community leaders to rally and promote business, helping to form a Board of Trade in 1873.
