= Joseph P. Dyer =

American politician from California, mine superintendent and stockbroker

Joseph Palmer Dyer (January 29, 1827 – July 7, 1891) was an American politician of California, mine superintendent and stockbroker.

== Biography ==
He was born in Vinalhaven, Maine, the son of George Dyer (1785–1865) and Jane Pendleton (1792–1863). Dyer was the mayor of Sacramento, California, in 1857.

He was married on October 4, 1853, in Rockport, Maine, to Deborah Hatheway Curtis (1829-?) They had the following children, all born in California: Alice C. Dyer (ca. 1855-?); Jennie Dyer (ca. 1857-?); Joseph B. Dyer (ca. 1859-?); Ralph Dyer (January 16, 1864-?); Ruth Barstow Dyer (January 16, 1864-?); and Mary Stackpole Dyer (April 21, 1865 – January 14, 1941).

While his family lived in Woburn, Massachusetts, in 1870, Dyer was in Mariposa, California, working as a superintendent of a mine. In 1880, they were all together in Oakland, and Dyer was a stockbroker.

Joseph P. Dyer died at age 64 in Sacramento.

| Preceded by Benjamin B. Redding | Mayor of Sacramento, California; 1857 | Succeeded by Henry L. Nichols |
