= Henry Bates (politician) =

American politician

State Treasurer of California
- In office 1856–1857
- Preceded by: Selden A. McMeans
- Succeeded by: James L. English

Member of the California State Assembly
- In office 1855–1856
- Constituency: 13th district

Personal details
- Born: 1823 or 1824
- Died: San Francisco, California, U.S.
- Cause of death: Tuberculosis
- Party: American Party
- Occupation: Politician

Henry Bates (1823 or 1824 – November 19, 1862) of Shasta County, California was a politician affiliated with the American Party (the "Know Nothings"). He served as California state treasurer, 1856–1857. Prior to that, he was a member of the California State Assembly from the 13th district, 1855–1856. As state treasurer, he was impeached by California State Assembly and convicted in his impeachment trial before the California State Assembly, and resigned before his formal sentencing.

== Biography ==
Henry Bates was born in 1823 or 1824. He moved to California from Worcester, Massachusetts in 1851.

The investigation and ultimate removal of Bates from office was spurred by an article in The Sacramento Bee, at the time of publication less than one week old. The initial accusation against Bates was that he had illegally deposited $88,000 ($2,386,172 in 2016 dollars) with Palmer, Cook & Co. for the purpose of paying the interest on state bonds in New York City in July 1856, without requiring security for this deposit; and that the interest was not paid. A report to that effect was presented in the Senate in January 1857. Soon afterward the assembly drew up articles of impeachment against him, for the Palmer, Cook & Co. matter, for purchasing state warrants with state funds and pocketing the difference in value; for other dubious transactions; and for a "corrupt combination" with the president of the Pacific Express Company for loaning state money. Bates was found guilty in his impeachment trial before the State Senate, but resigned from office before his sentence was formally entered. He was sentenced by the State Senate to be disqualified from holding state office again.

He died from tuberculosis in San Francisco on November 18, 1862.

Political offices
Preceded by Selden A. McMeans	State Treasurer of California; 1856–1857	Succeeded by James L. English
