= 2020 Sacramento City Council election =

Local election in California

- March 3 (primary); November 3 (runoff)

4 of 8 seats on Sacramento City Council

The 2020 Sacramento City Council election took place on March 3, 2020, to elect four of the eight seats of the Sacramento City Council, with runoff elections taking place on November 3, 2020. Runoffs only occurred if no candidate receives more than 50% of the votes cast in the contest. Local elections in California are officially nonpartisan. Each councilmember is elected to a four-year term, and does not have any term limits.

== District 2 ==
Incumbent Allen Warren was elected to the 2nd district in 2012 and 2016. He was eligible for reelection.

=== Endorsements ===
Allen Warren

Political party chapters

- Sacramento County Democratic Party

=== Results ===
2020 Sacramento City Council 2nd district election
Primary election
Candidate	Votes	%
Allen Warren (incumbent)	3,210	39.2
Sean Loloee	2,191	26.9
Ramona Landeros	1,917	23.5
Lamar Jefferson	834	10.2
Total votes	8,152	100.0
General election
Sean Loloee	10,166	56.3
Allen Warren (incumbent)	7,878	43.7
Total votes	18,044	100.0

== District 4 ==
Incumbent Steve Hansen was elected to the 4th district in 2012 and 2016. He was eligible for reelection.

=== Endorsements ===
Steve Hansen

Labor unions

- IBEW Local 1245

=== Results ===
2020 Sacramento City Council 4th district election
Primary election
Candidate	Votes	%
Katie Valenzuela	11,570	53.3
Steve Hansen (incumbent)	10,130	46.7
Total votes	21,700	100.0

== District 6 ==
Incumbent Eric Guerra was initially elected to the 6th district in the 2015 special primary election, and was subsequently reelected in 2016. He was eligible for reelection.

=== Results ===
2020 Sacramento City Council 6th district election
Primary election
Candidate	Votes	%
Eric Guerra (incumbent)	9,180	65.4
Kevin Rooney	2,034	14.5
Eric Frame	1,704	12.1
Waverly Hampton III	1,114	7.9
Total votes	14,032	100.0

== District 8 ==
Incumbent Larry Carr was initially elected to 8th district in the 2014 special primary election, and was subsequently reelected in 2016. He was eligible for reelection, but chose not to run.

=== Endorsements ===
Mai Vang

Political party chapters

- Sacramento County Democratic Party
- Sacramento County Young Democrats

Labor unions

- IBEW Local 1245
Les Simmons

Political party chapters

- Sacramento County Latinx Young Democrats

=== Results ===
2020 Sacramento City Council 6th district election
Primary election
Candidate	Votes	%
Mai Vang	4,705	47.5
Les Simmons	3,309	33.4
Santiago Morales	713	7.2
Ronald Bell	662	6.7
Daphne Harris	622	6.3
Total votes	9,911	100.0
General election
Mai Vang	10,225	52.1
Les Simmons	9,386	47.9
Total votes	19,611	100.0
