= Henry L. Nichols =

American politician

Henry Lambard Nichols
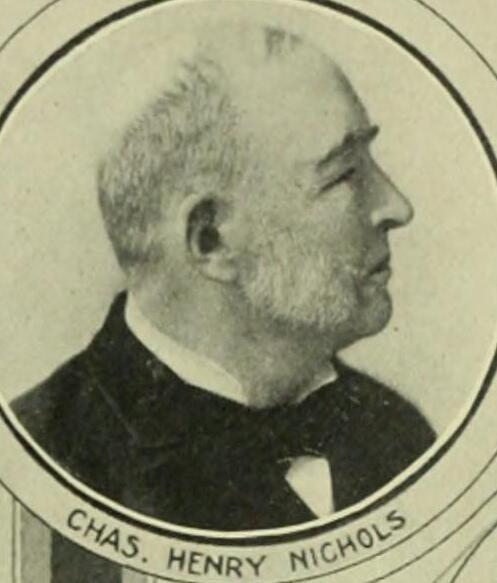

Secretary of State of California
- In office 1867–1871
- Governor: Henry Huntly Haight
- Preceded by: Benjamin B. Redding
- Succeeded by: Drury Melone

Mayor of Sacramento, California
- In office 1858–1858
- Preceded by: Joseph P. Dyer
- Succeeded by: W. Shattuck

Personal details
- Born: September 11, 1823 Augusta, Maine
- Died: February 16, 1915 (aged 91) Sacramento
- Party: Democratic
- Spouse: Sarah Evans Cole

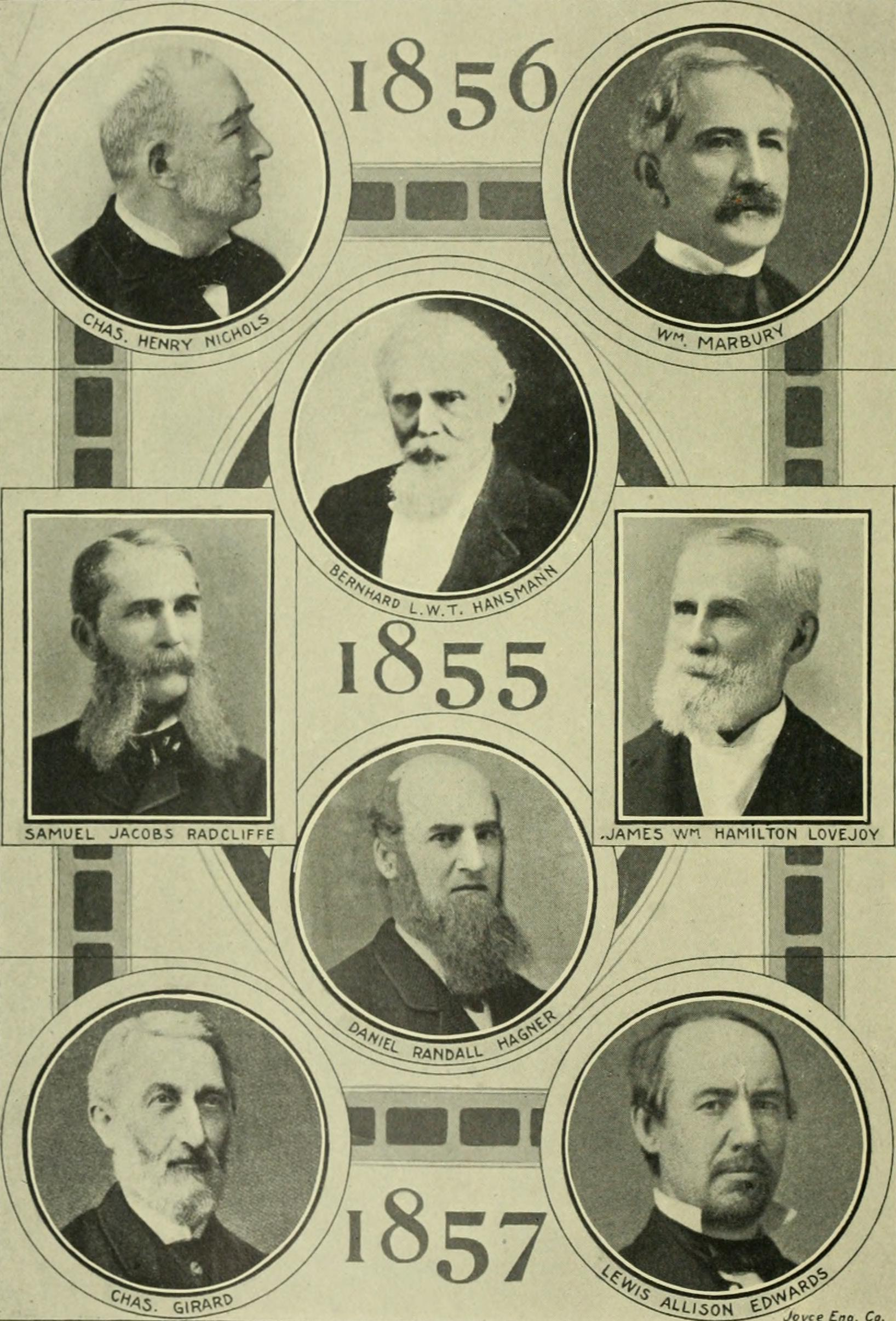
Nichols (top left) with other physicians

Henry Lambard Nichols (September 11, 1823 – February 16, 1915) was an American physician and Democratic politician from California.

== Biography ==
He was born in Augusta, Maine, the son of Asaph R. Nichols (1797–1860) and Lucy Lambard (1803–1884). His father, a prominent attorney, was clerk of the Supreme Court for many years and was Secretary of State of Maine from 1835 to 1837, and again in 1839. He was also postmaster. Henry graduated from the Medical School of Maine, Bowdoin College in Brunswick, in 1845. Afterward, he completed a postgraduate course at the Jefferson Medical College in Philadelphia. He then returned to his native city and began practicing his profession.

On August 16, 1847, he and Sarah Evans Cole (ca. 1824 – November 17, 1893), were married in Augusta. Their children were Arthur Lambard Nichols (August 1849 in Maine-1919 in California); Harry E. Nichols (ca. 1853 in Maine-?); Sarah Nichols (November 7, 1857 in Sacramento-Stillborn); Lucy R. Nichols (February 1859 in California-?); Anna H. Nichols (ca. 1861 in California-?); and Harry E. Nichols (ca. 1876 in California-?).

Nichols's uncle, Allen Lambard, went to Sacramento, California, in 1852, and established the Lambard Flouring Mills, located on the corner of Second and I Streets, and the Sacramento Iron Works, where the wheels of the first locomotive ever used on a California railway were turned. Because of his uncles' enthusiastic descriptions of the opportunities in California, Nichols decided to move to the Golden State. He traveled to the West Coast aboard ship. After disembarking at Panama and crossing the isthmus, he boarded another ship to San Francisco, and arrived in Sacramento, in January 1853.

His medical office was at Second and I Streets. Nichols was active in community service and in politics. A Conservative Democrat, he helped bring his party to prominence. He was elected president of the Board of Supervisors and served as Mayor of Sacramento in 1858. In 1859, he was a member of the reception committee at the time of the visit of Horace Greeley. In that same year, Nichols was at the meeting held at the celebration of the laying of the Atlantic cable.

From 1867 to 1871, he served as Secretary of State. When the California State Capitol building was completed he climbed to the top of the dome and placed the golden ball into place. While he was in office, the location was selected for the University of California at Berkeley.

Nichols held other public offices too numerous to mention, including the Board of State Prison directors; one of the Trustees of the State Library, appointed by Governor Haight to fill the unexpired term of Governor Bigler; secretary of the State Board of Health; a City Health Officer; an Emergency Hospital Surgeon; and secretary of the Sacramento Board of Health.

Sanitation was of great concern to Nichols. His essay Water Supply of Sacramento sparked changes necessary for safe drinking water. In 1885, he was president of the Sacramento Society for Medical Improvement. He was President of the board of trustees for the Unitarian Society of Sacramento, 1868–1915, and is considered its founder.

Henry L. Nichols died at age 91 in Sacramento. He is interred in the Sacramento Historic City Cemetery (aka Old City Cemetery), along with his wife and stillborn daughter.

Preceded by Joseph P. Dyer	Mayor of Sacramento, California; 1858	Succeeded by W. Shattuck

Preceded by Benjamin B. Redding	Secretary of State of California; 1867–1871	Succeeded by Drury Melone
