= Edwin G. Waite =

American politician

16th California Secretary of State
- In office 1891–1894
- Governor: Henry Markham
- Preceded by: William C. Hendricks
- Succeeded by: Albert Hart

California State Assemblyman
- In office 1855–1856
- Constituency: Assembly District 16

District Attorney
- In office 1854–1855

Personal details
- Died: 1894-10-30
- Party: Whig; Know Nothing; Union; Republican
- Spouse: Julia Eliza Stone
- Children: Julia, Mary, Effie, Edith

Edwin G. Waite (died 30 October 1894) was an American politician, newspaper man, author, and goldminer. He was a member of California's 16th State Assembly district, Alameda, California from 1855 until 1856. In 1891, he became Secretary of State of California, and died in office in 1894. He belonged to the Whig, Know Nothing, Union, and Republican parties during his political career.

While living in Nevada County, California, Waite was a newspaperman associated with the Nevada Daily Transcript and The Nevada Journal of Nevada City, California. He was the coauthor of The Discovery of Gold in California, which included a section entitled 'Pioneer Mining'—a reprint of Waite's recollection experiences in the gold diggings period (1849–1851).

He married Julia Eliza Stone (born March 17, 1839) on May 13, 1856.

Waite is interred in the Sacramento Historic City Cemetery in Sacramento, California.

== Partial bibliography ==
- Hittel, J. S., Marshall, J. W., & Waite, E. G. (1968). The discovery of gold in California. Palo Alto, Calif: Lewis Osborne. OCLC 2095273.

Political offices
| Preceded by | California AD; 1854–1855 | Succeeded by |
| Preceded by | California State Assemblyman, 16th District; 1855–1856 | Succeeded by |
| Preceded by William C. Hendricks | Secretary of State of California; 1891–1894 | Succeeded by Albert Hart |
