= A. M. Winn =

American politician (1810–1883)

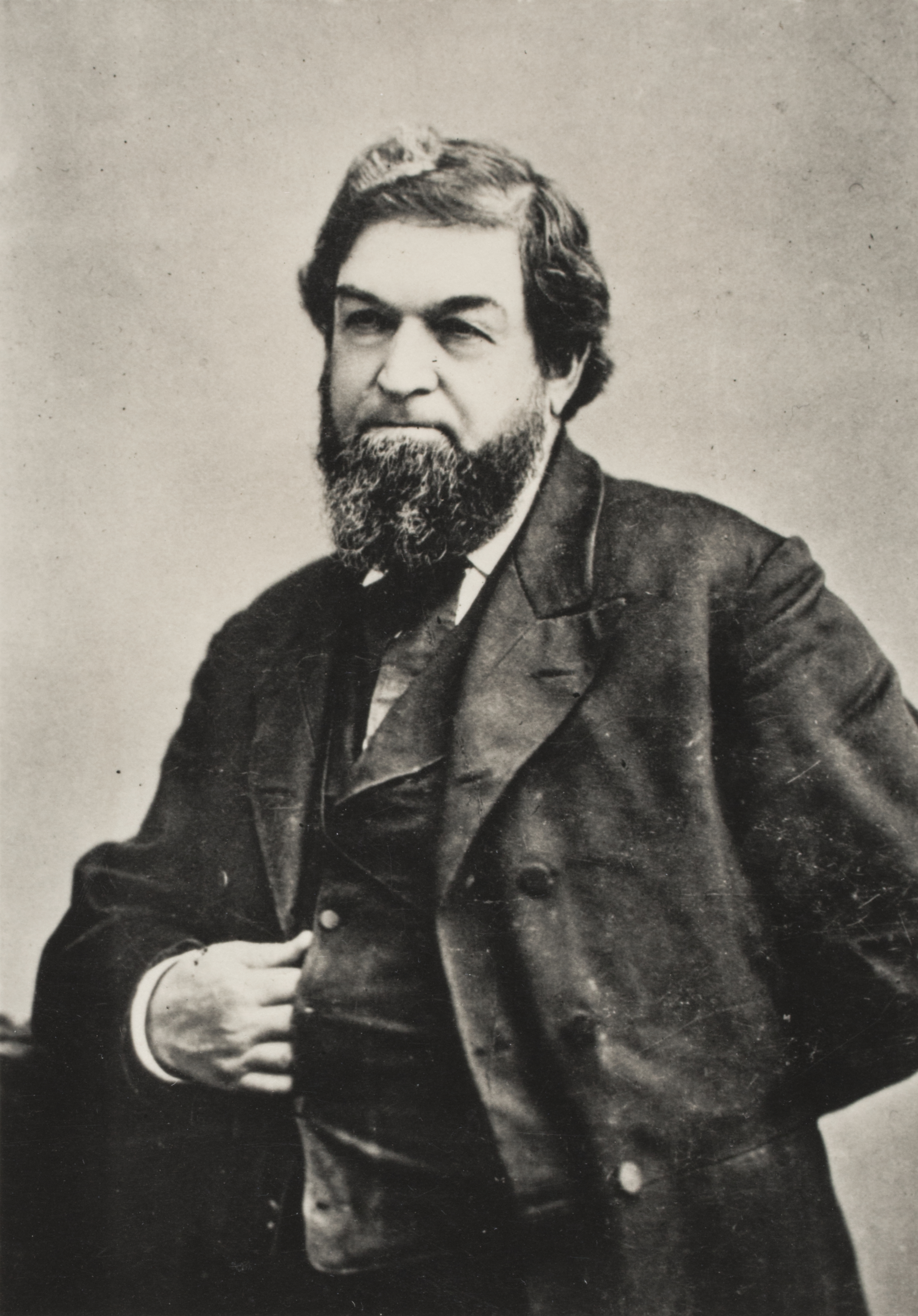
- Winn c. 1870

2nd President of the Sacramento City Council
- In office August 25, 1849 – April 1, 1850
- Preceded by: William Stout
- Succeeded by: Hardin Bigelow (as Mayor of Sacramento)

Personal details
- Born: Albert Maver Winn; April 27, 1810 Loudoun County, Virginia, U.S.
- Died: August 26, 1883 (aged 73) Sonoma, California, U.S.
- Resting place: Sacramento Historic City Cemetery; 38.5625°N 121.5011°W
- Party: Democratic
- Other political affiliations: Know Nothing
- Spouse(s): Catherine Gaffney (m. 1829; died 1862) Charlotte Libbey (m. 1865)
- Children: Adolphus; Frances; Ada; Emily
- Occupation: Carpenter, military officer, politician, labor leader
- Known for: Founder of the Native Sons of the Golden West

Military service
- Allegiance: United States
- Branch/service: United States Army; California State Militia
- Rank: Major General
- Unit: 1st Mississippi Rifles
- Battles/wars: Mexican–American War

Albert Maver Winn (April 27, 1810 – August 26, 1883) was an American carpenter, military officer, politician, labor leader, Odd Fellow, Freemason and founder of the Native Sons of the Golden West.

Winn was born in Loudoun County, Virginia, came to California on May 28, 1849, and settled in Sacramento on June 25 of that year. He immediately became active in civic affairs and in the fall of 1849 was elected to Sacramento's first City Council in and selected as its President, he was ex-officio the first mayor of Sacramento. But unlike his successor, Hardin Bigelow, he was not elected directly to the office. He went on to be appointed the State Adjutant General and an early proponent of the small business community and labor reform movement. He remained in the state until his death and is remembered as one of the State's Founding Fathers.

General Winn not only made his contributions to the civil and military beginnings of Sacramento, he was a prime mover in the fraternal and religious life of his community as well. He founded the Sons of the Revolutionary Sires, later the Sons of the American Revolution, and was its first President. In 1851 he organized the Sacramento Odd Fellows General Relief Committee and he was elected its first president. He also was instrumental in the establishment of Grace Church (later St. Paul's), the first Episcopal church in Sacramento, of which he was both an officer and communicant. Winn was also a Mason. Indeed, his granddaughter wrote, "We are told that the general belonged to every fraternal society in Sacramento in the early days and it is quite probable that this is true." He founded the Native Sons of the Golden West (NSGW). General Winn died at Sonoma on August 26, 1883, and was buried in Sacramento.

== Background ==
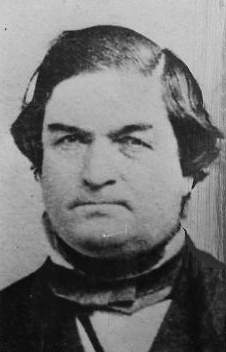
Winn in an undated photograph

His family moved to Zanesville, Ohio, where he attended a one-room school and, at the age of 16, became a carpenter's apprentice. It was here that he began his interests in civic association which he later came to exemplify. In 1829 he married Catherine Gaffney in Zanesville, and they moved to Vicksburg, Mississippi, in 1832.

== Career ==
In keeping with conscription into the militia under state law, Albert attended military training. In light of his aptitude and education, Albert attended additional military schooling and was appointed a Lieutenant in the local militia in 1835. With his journeyman status and military rank, Albert was recommended for membership in the Fraternal order Independent Order of Odd Fellows. Here he met other ranking members of the local community and was introduced into political circles as a Jackson Democrat.

In 1836 he was promoted to the rank of Major in the militia and served as assistant quartermaster on the staff of Gov. Charles Lynch. Winn was appointed Drill Master in 1840, and on February 28, 1845, was made a Colonel in the First Regiment of the Mississippi Militia which became known as the Mississippi Rifles. He was one of the judges of an election board that elected Jefferson Davis as Colonel of the First Mississippi Regiment of Volunteers and with him later went on to serve in the Mexican War. It was at the Battle of Buena Vista when other American units began to be overrun by the Mexicans that Col. Davis gave the now-famous order, "Stand fast, Mississippians!" The regiment stood their ground and the battle was eventually won. Davis' order later became the regimental motto. The unit was instrumental in capturing Monterrey, and mustered for service in the Spanish–American War.

Winn was also the Secretary of the Phoenix Engine Fire Company and later President of the Master Carpenters and Joiners Society of Vicksburg. Under successive increasing grades of leadership, Winn was quickly noticed for his technical and leadership abilities. Under the auspices of these organizations, Winn was given authority to expand the networks and associations of these organizations into the growing American settlement in the West as part of the policy of Manifest Destiny.

On February 2, 1849, at the age of 38, Albert was ordered to establish and expand a new settlement in the recently organized state of California and help organize its civic and labor movement. Leaving his wife and son behind, he journeyed to New Orleans where he joined a Settlers and Explorers Company under Major Kinney. This company traveled by steamboat to Corpus Christi, Texas, and from there traveled overland to Durango, Mexico, where some members of the company split off to work on advance work with filibustering. Winn, however, continued to Mazatlán, from which Albert took a bark to San Francisco, arriving May 28, 1849. Winn then took a sailboat upriver to Freeport and walked from there to Sutter's Fort, where he arrived on June 15.

=== Work in California ===
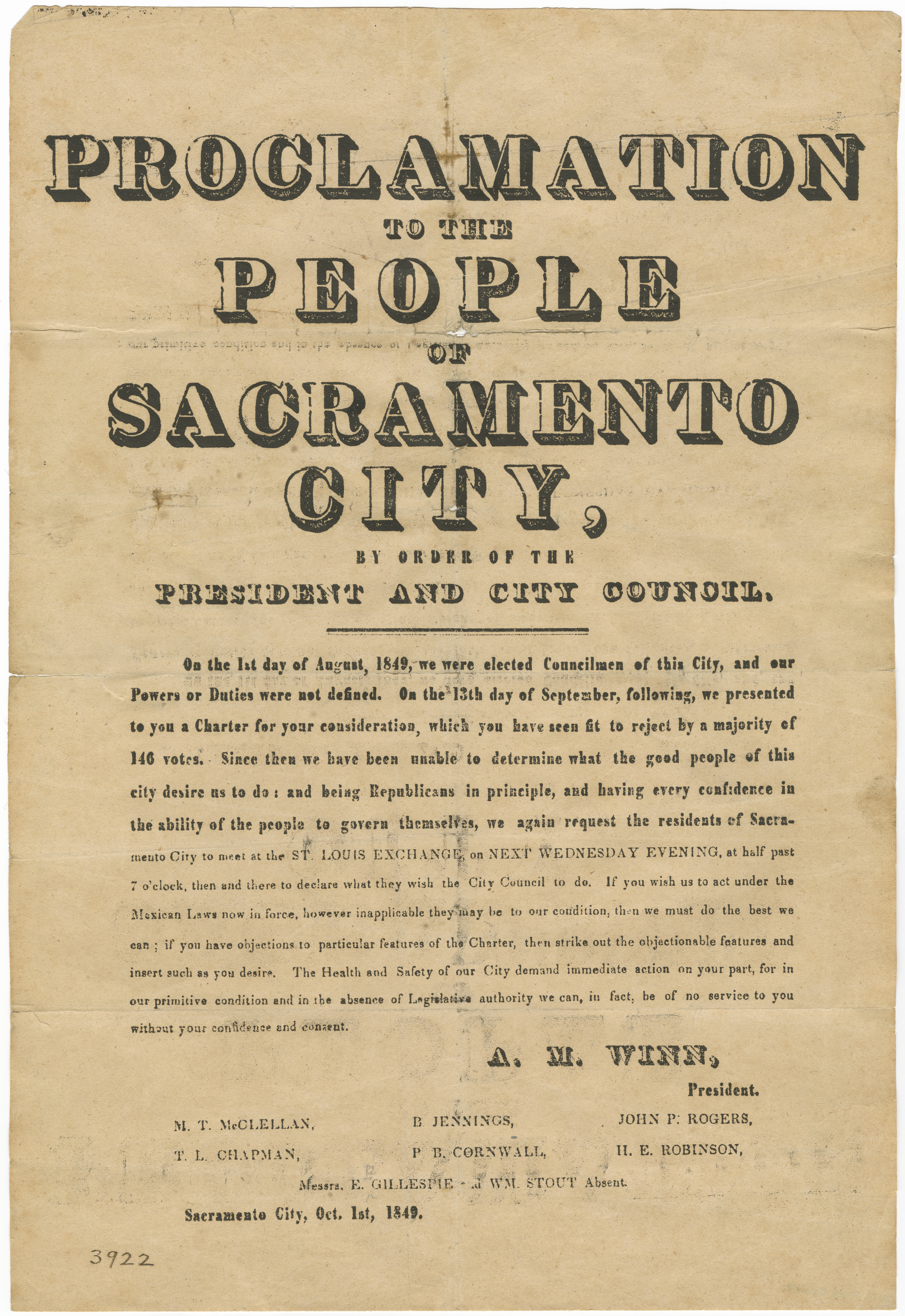
Proclamation to the people of Sacramento City, by order of the President and City Council. October 1, 1849

Arriving in Sacramento City on June 25, he immediately set up his carpenter's bench under the shade of an oak tree at the foot of K Street and commenced work on a coffin, which he immediately sold for $50. Organizing the various craftsmen of carpenters and craftsmen he soon had a large commercial enterprise which included a partnership with the Baker and McGhee General Store. On August 1 he was elected as a member of the Sacramento City Council and was chosen as its President on August 25.

To further cement the ties of the civic population in the growing town of Sacramento, Winn went about organizing the Independent Order of Odd Fellows. On August 20, for the purpose of providing assistance and relief to brother Odd Fellows who were suffering from illness and distress from their overland or ocean voyage, and to bury the dead, the first general meeting of the Odd Fellows was held at the general store. Winn's first order of business when he became President of the City Council was to ensure that the dead were provided a coffin for burial. Prior to then, the dead were buried in their blanket, in which they were sewn.

Sometime during Fall of 1849, Captain John Sutter gave Winn power of attorney to sell land and Winn, as Sutter's agent offered lots and farms on the Sacramento and Feather Rivers for sale. Winn also borrowed $5,000 in Sutter's name at 10% interest per month and failed to notify Sutter or furnish an accounting. Sutter learned of this indebtedness only when the Sheriff served an attachment on him. By that time the debt had grown to $35,000.

Having established and organized the arts and craftsmen and burghers of Sacramento, Winn worked to cement the contracts and union of the various commercial enterprises. Together with his financial bakers in the city, and flush with profits from the gold trade, Winn and his associates began the establishment of Grace Episcopal Church in Sacramento during August 1849.

With his associates in the Episcopal Church and senior officers of the Odd Fellows, Winn helped charter and establish the Freemason's Tehama Lodge. With the full support of the Odd Fellows, joined by the Masons and Grace Episcopal Church, the first hospital was established in California at Sutter's Fort. It became a joint venture between the Odd Fellows and the Masons on land which Winn had donated.

However, the coming year would prove to be less successful. The flood of January 1850 ruined the entire stock of Winn, Baker & McGhee and the business failed. Winn entered into a partnership with A. C. Latson on February 28, 1850, advertising their business as builders and lumber merchants. When Sacramento City became chartered on February 23, an election was held for new city officers. Hardin Bigelow was elected Mayor on April 1 and Winn relinquished his position as the city's executive.

Nonetheless, because of his considerable achievements in the prior two years, and his previous military experience in Mississippi, Winn was appointed an officer in the California State Militia. On April 10, the California Legislature passed a resolution appointing A. M. Winn as Brigadier-General. Governor Peter Burnett approved his appointment.

The next four years were ones of considerable turmoil in California. Although the influx of Americans like Winn helped put California on a road of civilized progress, large numbers of indigent and foreign persons also arrived whose morals were considerably less grounded. Riots and organized criminal activity spread throughout the state and soon California was the most lawless state in the Union.

Among the most ruthless criminals was the gang of Joaquin Murietta. Winn helped organize the commission and survey which lead to the establishment of the California State Rangers from among the State Militia. Additionally, he helped the various societies throughout the state organize the associations which identified, recruited, and supported the lawmen and Vigilante groups that would pacify the state in a few years. uring the Squatters Riots of 1850, Winn issued a Proclamation declaring Martial Law and brought 500 members of the State Militia to patrol the streets of Sacramento City to guard against further civil unrest. In October, Winn participated in raising a force during the Coloma Indian troubles in El Dorado County. During the Cholera Epidemic of October - November 1850, Winn used his entire stock of lumber making coffins to bury the dead at his own expense. As a result of these successes, Winn was reappointed by Governor John Bigler four years later.

Believing that strong law and order programs needed to be balanced with moral and educational programs aimed at mitigating addiction, vice, and criminality, Winn became a member of the Sons of Temperance in 1853 and organized the Winn Division # 220 in Sacramento. The Division was successful in limiting the number and location of saloons, establishing hospices and treatment centers, and publishing articles on the dangers of alcoholic and narcotic uses.

Winn also became a member of the Sacramento Pioneers Association and the Order of the Star Spangled Banner on November 11, 1855. Through these organizations, he helped push through several educational programs intent on organizing youth activity and growing civic consciousness in young adults especially those of foreign origin.

In 1857 Winn bought 1/5 interest in a syndicate which had purchased 3/4 of all land that John Sutter had claimed in what became Sutter County. Winn owned 2,700 acres (11 km^{2}) along the Sacramento River in Sutter County, called "Winn's Ranch" where he built a landing where riverboats could stop which came to be known as "Winn's Landing". While living there he became the first president of the California Swamp Land Commission which had as its goal the clearing of pestilence prone swamp areas near towns and later became the chief organization behind the development of the San Joaquin agricultural valley. With these several successes behind him and under the influence of his numerous friends and associates, Winn took several runs at political office. However, his success had also earned enemies. Several corrupt machines in Sacramento and San Francisco, especially those with saloon, immigrant, and Catholic ties were virulently opposed to him. He was consistently rebuffed, and despite the success of the Know-Nothings in the growing Republican movement which he supported, the rise of sectarian issues between North and South and Free and Slave complicated and ultimately divided the associations he had worked to establish. He was defeated in a bid for the California legislature, whose Congress later went on to deal with the Secession Crisis.

Winn moved to San Francisco in 1860 and engaged in the real estate business. He was a regular contributor to the New Age and to the Daily Alta Californian. He stayed out of directly supporting either Union or Confederacy, but his sympathies remained with his native Virginia and his wife had relatives fighting in the confederacy. Finally, in 1862, tragedy struck as the roster list of dead from Shiloh was relayed. Stricken with grief at the loss of her family at the battle his wife Catherine died in 1862.

Nonetheless, he continued to work at improving labor and small business associations at the local level. During his period in San Francisco, he edited the Labor journal known as The Shop and Senate. However, the Catholic and business political machine which Winn and others had worked against continued to remain strong in the city and Winn was consistently defeated at maneuvers to obtain a seat. Yet, with his reforming role and his association with the past Vigilante Committee and American Party Winn was introduced to Charlotte L. King, the widow of the crusading editor of The San Francisco Bulletin, James King of William, who had been shot to death by Tammany Hall connected James P. Casey in 1856. On September 16, 1865, Albert married Charlotte L. King and with the end of the War, his interests renewed in state affairs.

He took the lead in the Carpenter's Union's effort to enact legislation for an eight-hour workday in 1867. The Mechanics State Council was formed in 1867 at Winn's suggestion. He drafted their constitution and bylaws and served as their first President. Finally, he was instrumental in forming the Building and Trades Council of San Francisco which later went on to be a founding organization of the American Federation of Labor. In 1869, Winn traveled to the eastern states where he spent several months pressing for federal legislation for an eight-hour day, restricting immigration to non-Catholic whites, worker safety rules in interstate commerce and a restriction on holding office to native born.

In keeping with his long-held belief in 100% Americanism and fostering a lasting national identity on its native culture, in 1869, Winn attempted to organize a society to promote the culture and lineage of the founding fathers of American California based upon apprentices in the artisan and craftsmen trades. This initial society failed because the boys were too young to face the combination of hostility from big business and criminal discrimination from foreign ethnic political machines. So instead, he cultivated the members and in 1875 successfully rallied master craftsmen and small farmers in perfecting and establishing the organization which later became known as the Native Sons of the Golden West on July 11, 1875. Speaking of his object in organizing the Order General Winn said "For twenty years my mind had been running on some lasting style of monument to mark and perpetuate the discovery of gold I could not think of anything that would not perish in course of time. At last, it came to my mind that an Order composed of native sons would affect the object and be sustained by pride of parentage and place of nativity while it would be an imperishable memento an institution that would last through all time."

The following year, in honor of the centennial, he organized the descendants of the Revolutionary War to march in the Independence Day Parade at the Palace Hotel in San Francisco in 1876. After the march, he organized the body which went on to become the Sons of the American Revolution. This organization elected Winn as their first President, an office he held for five years.

== Death ==
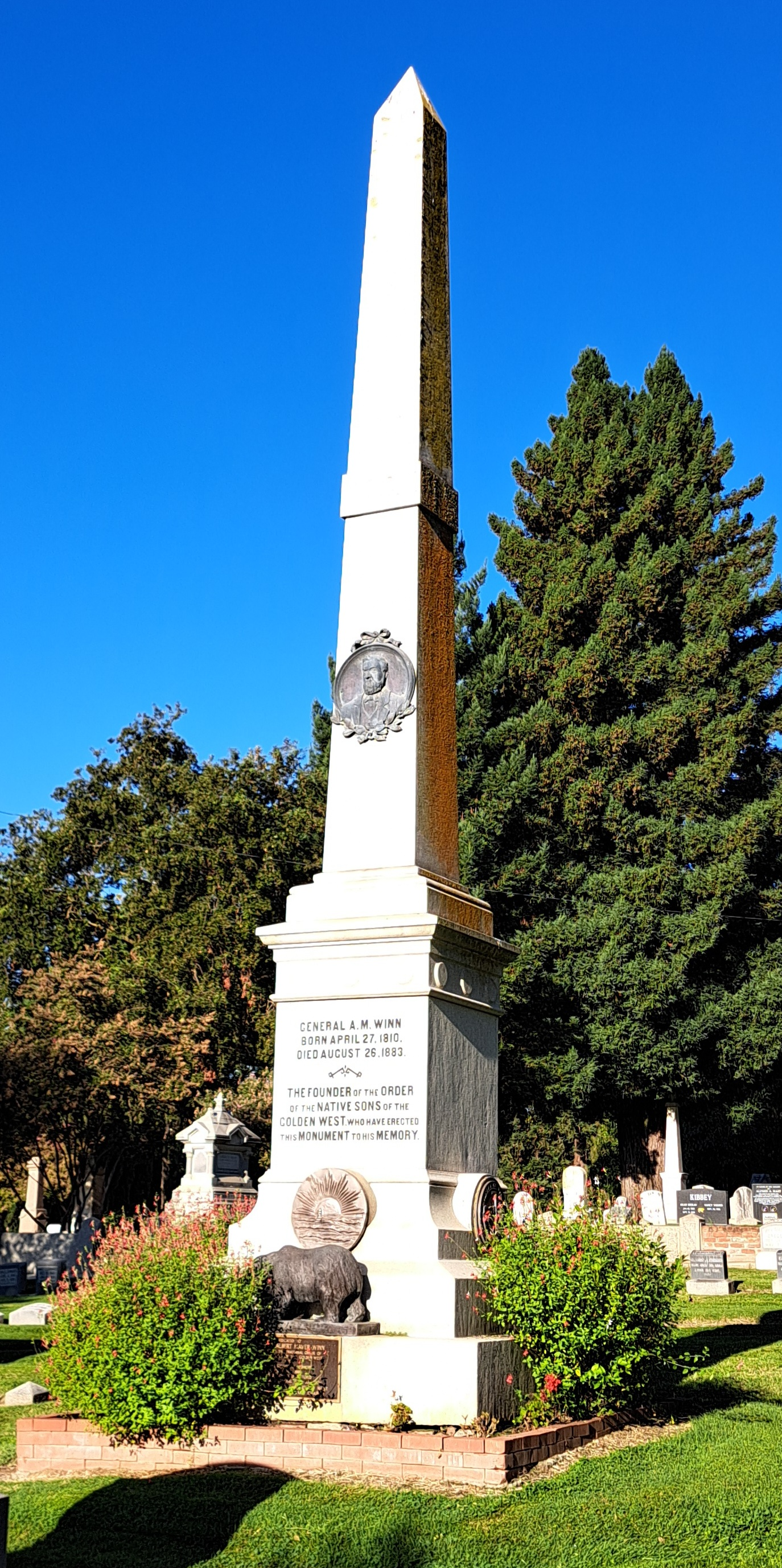
A. M. Winn Grave

Winn died in Sonoma, California, and his body was taken to Sacramento for the funeral. The Masons whose precepts he had so well adhered to, the Odd Fellows he had served so long and so faithfully, and the ministry of Grace Church he had helped to found might well have conducted his funeral, but this honor was given to the Native Sons of the Golden West who laid their Brother-Founder to rest under the ritual of the Order which gives back the body of the fallen son of California to the soil of his native state. Sacramento paid a high tribute to its first mayor, with courts and civic offices suspending business on the day of the funeral.

In 1887, the Grand Parlor voted to assess each member fifty cents to raise money for a monument on Winn's grave. The monument, erected in 1888 and restored in 2003 by Sunset Parlor #26, is a granite shaft fifteen feet high in the Pioneer Section of the Sacramento Historic City Cemetery. It is the tallest monument in the cemetery and a fitting tribute to the founder of the Native Sons of the Golden West.
