= Big Bar, California =

Big Bar, California may refer to:

- Big Bar, Butte County, California
- Big Bar, Trinity County, California
- Mokelumne Hill, California, formerly Big Bar
