= Charles W. Dannals =

American politician

Charles Wesley Dannals (1824–1893) was an American politician. Born on 2 November 1824 in New York City as the youngest child of John Dannals and Hannah DeWitt, Dannals migrated west as a young man, as he was a member of the California State Assembly in 1854 and 1855, one of five members representing Yuba County. He married Darion D. Wood. For the year 1870-71 he was, as a member of the Sacramento lodge, Grandmaster of the Independent Order of Odd Fellows of California. Dannals died on September 31, 1893.

Political offices
Preceded by Three members	California State Assemblyman, 15th District (Yuba County seat); 1854-1855 (with four others)	Succeeded by Five members
