= Tuttletown, California =

Census designated place in California

Tuttletown
- census-designated place
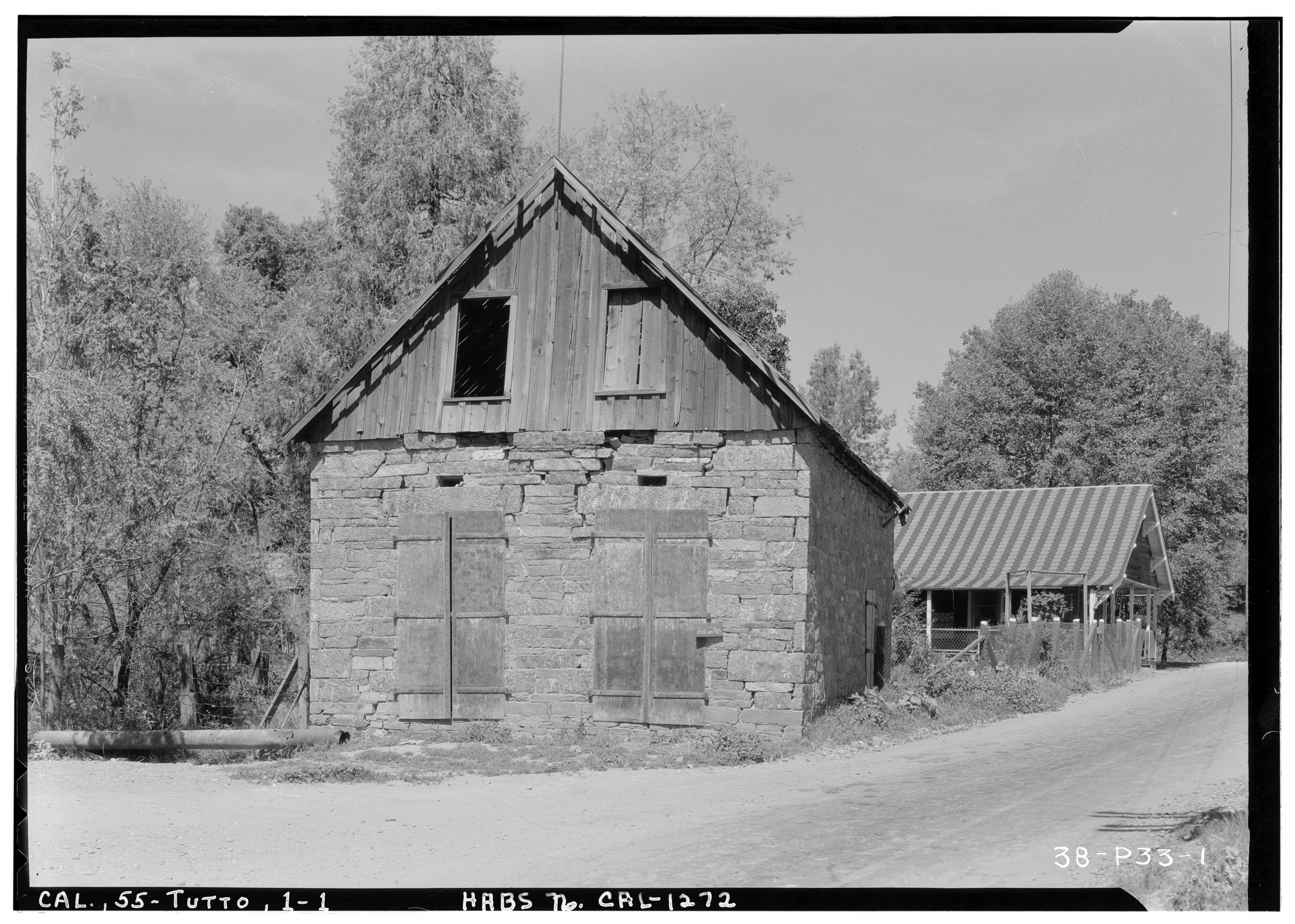
- Swerer's Store, Tuttletown

- Position in California.
- Coordinates: 38°00′25″N 120°27′04″W
- Country: United States
- State: California
- County: Tuolumne

Area
  - Total: 7.357 sq mi (19.055 km^{2})
  - Land: 7.351 sq mi (19.038 km^{2})
  - Water: 0.0066 sq mi (0.017 km^{2}) 0.09%
- Elevation: 1,440 ft (440 m)

Population (2020)
  - Total: 787
  - Density: 107/sq mi (41.3/km^{2})
- Time zone: UTC-8 (Pacific (PST))
  - Summer (DST): UTC-7 (PDT)
- GNIS feature IDs: 2583171; 1660047

California Historical Landmark
- Reference no.: 124

Tuttletown (formerly Mormon Gulch and Tuttleville) is a census-designated place (CDP) in Tuolumne County, California, United States. It is located on State Route 49 near the gold rush community of Columbia. Tuttletown sits at an elevation of 1,047 feet (319 m). The 2020 United States census reported Tuttletown's population was 787.

== History ==
Tuttletown is registered as a California Historical Landmark. The community was originally known as Mormon Gulch, because of a company of Mormons who began mining gold there in 1848. Toward the end of the summer, however, Judge A. A. H. Tuttle settled at the place and built a log cabin. His tavern became the focal point of the village that became Tuttletown.

== Geography ==
According to the United States Census Bureau, the CDP covers an area of 7.4 square miles (19.1 km^{2}), of which 99.91% is land and 0.09% is water.

== Demographics ==
Historical population
Census	Pop.	Note	%±
2010	668		—
2020	787		17.8%
U.S. Decennial Census; 1850–1870 1880-1890; 1900 1910 1920; 1930 1940 1950; 1960 1970 1980; 1990 2000 2010

Tuttletown first appeared as a census designated place in the 2010 U.S. census.

== Racial and ethnic composition ==
Tuttletown CDP, California – Racial and ethnic composition Note: the US Census treats Hispanic/Latino as an ethnic category. This table excludes Latinos from the racial categories and assigns them to a separate category. Hispanics/Latinos may be of any race.
Race / Ethnicity (NH = Non-Hispanic)	Pop 2010	Pop 2020	% 2010	% 2020
White alone (NH)	580	618	86.83%	78.53%
Black or African American alone (NH)	5	8	0.75%	1.02%
Native American or Alaska Native alone (NH)	14	14	2.10%	1.78%
Asian alone (NH)	5	10	0.75%	1.27%
Native Hawaiian or Pacific Islander alone (NH)	0	2	0.00%	0.25%
Other race alone (NH)	0	8	0.00%	1.02%
Mixed race or Multiracial (NH)	16	46	2.40%	5.84%
Hispanic or Latino (any race)	48	81	7.19%	10.29%
Total	668	787	100.00%	100.00%

=== 2020 census ===
The 2020 United States census reported that Tuttletown had a population of 787. The population density was 107.1 inhabitants per square mile (41.4/km^{2}). The racial makeup of Tuttletown was 637 (80.9%) White, 8 (1.0%) African American, 17 (2.2%) Native American, 11 (1.4%) Asian, 3 (0.4%) Pacific Islander, 21 (2.7%) from other races, and 90 (11.4%) from two or more races. Hispanic or Latino of any race were 81 persons (10.3%).

The census reported that 768 people (97.6% of the population) lived in households, 19 (2.4%) lived in non-institutionalized group quarters, and no one was institutionalized.

There were 331 households, out of which 86 (26.0%) had children under the age of 18 living in them, 183 (55.3%) were married-couple households, 29 (8.8%) were cohabiting couple households, 58 (17.5%) had a female householder with no partner present, and 61 (18.4%) had a male householder with no partner present. 69 households (20.8%) were one person, and 43 (13.0%) were one person aged 65 or older. The average household size was 2.32. There were 238 families (71.9% of all households).

The age distribution was 137 people (17.4%) under the age of 18, 33 people (4.2%) aged 18 to 24, 154 people (19.6%) aged 25 to 44, 246 people (31.3%) aged 45 to 64, and 217 people (27.6%) who were 65 years of age or older. The median age was 52.5 years. For every 100 females, there were 93.8 males.

There were 374 housing units at an average density of 50.9 units per square mile (19.7 units/km^{2}), of which 331 (88.5%) were occupied. Of these, 301 (90.9%) were owner-occupied, and 30 (9.1%) were occupied by renters.

== California Historical Landmark ==
Tuttletownis a California Historical Landmark. California Historical Landmark number 124 reads:

NO. 124 TUTTLETOWN - This early-day stopping place for men and mounts was named for Judge Anson A. H. Tuttle, who built the first log cabin here in 1848. Stones used in the base for the plaque are from the old Swerer store built in 1854, remains of which still exist (1949). Mark Twain traded here. Tuttletown Hotel, built in 1852 and still standing in 1949, was last operated by John Edwards.

== See also ==
- California Historical Landmarks in Tuolumne County, California
