= 2016 Sacramento City Council election =

Local election in California

- June 7 (primary)

4 of 8 seats on Sacramento City Council

The 2016 Sacramento City Council election took place on June 7, 2016, to elect four of the eight seats of the Sacramento City Council. Runoffs only occur if no candidate receives more than 50% of the votes cast in the contest, but no runoffs occurred this year for the Sacramento City Council. Local elections in California are officially nonpartisan. Each councilmember is elected to a four-year term, and does not have any term limits.

== District 2 ==
Incumbent Allen Warren was elected to the 2nd district in 2012 in the runoff with 50.7% of the vote. He was eligible for reelection.

=== Results ===
2016 Sacramento City Council 2nd district election
Primary election
Candidate	Votes	%
Allen Warren (incumbent)	3,967	55.3
Sondra Betancourt	2,086	29.1
Gregory Jefferson	1,096	15.3
Write-in	20	0.3
Total votes	7,169	100.0

== District 4 ==
Incumbent Steve Hansen was elected to the 4th district in 2012 in the runoff with 50.3% of the vote. He was eligible for reelection.

=== Results ===
2016 Sacramento City Council 4th district election
Primary election
Candidate	Votes	%
Steve Hansen (incumbent)	12,879	75.5
Susan "Sioux" Colombe	4,123	24.2
Write-in	61	0.4
Total votes	17,063	100.0

== District 6 ==
Incumbent Eric Guerra was elected to the 6th district in the 2015 special primary election with 62.8% of the vote. He was eligible for reelection.

=== Results ===
2016 Sacramento City Council 6th district election
Primary election
Candidate	Votes	%
Eric Guerra (incumbent)	9,366	98.5
Write-in	142	1.5
Total votes	9,508	100.0

== District 8 ==
Incumbent Larry Carr was elected to 8th district in the 2014 special primary election with 50.2% of the vote. He was eligible for reelection.

=== Results ===
2016 Sacramento City Council 8th district election
Primary election
Candidate	Votes	%
Larry Carr (incumbent)	4,566	64.7
Ronald E. Bell	1,920	27.2
Chris Baker	535	7.6
Write-in	35	0.5
Total votes	7,056	100.0
