= Secretary of State of California =

Chief elections officer of California, United States

- Great Seal of the State of California

- State flag

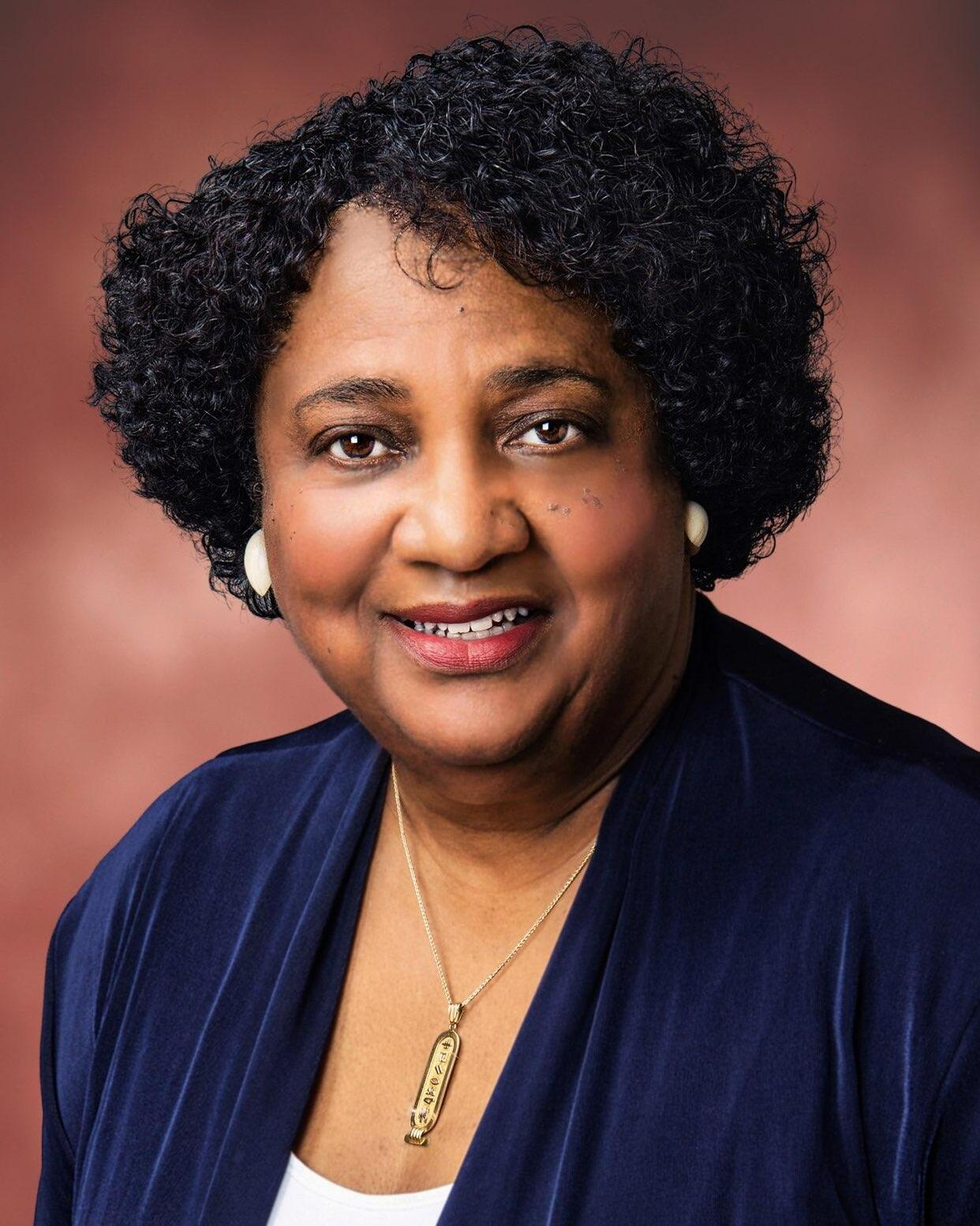
- Incumbent; Shirley Weber since January 29, 2021
- Government of California
- Style: The Honorable; Madam Secretary
- Term length: Four years, two term limit
- Inaugural holder: William Van Voorhies; 1849
- Formation: Constitution of California
- Succession: Fourth
- Salary: $184,447
- Website: www.sos.ca.gov

The secretary of state of California is the chief clerk of the U.S. state of California, overseeing a department of 500 people. The secretary of state is elected for four year terms, like the state's other constitutional officers; the officeholder is restricted by term limits to two terms. The current secretary of state is Shirley Weber, who assumed the role in 2021 after Alex Padilla's appointment to the US Senate.

== Duties ==
=== Elections ===
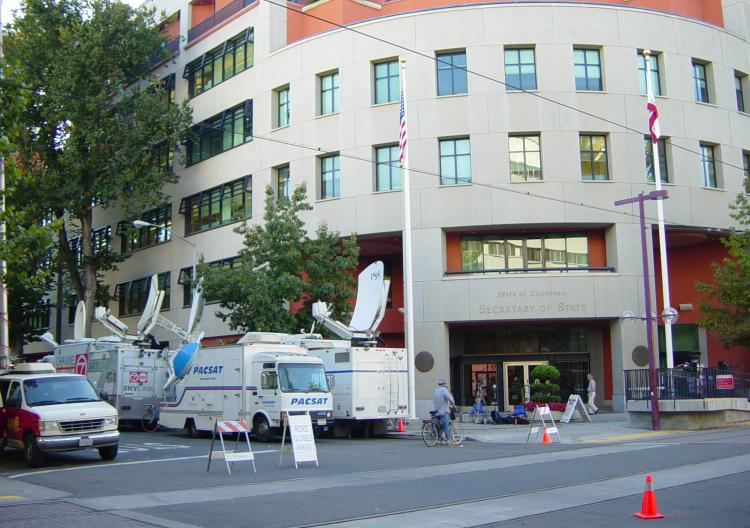
Office of the Secretary of State of California in Sacramento

The secretary of state is California's chief elections officer, overseeing all federal and state elections in the state and maintaining a database of registered voters. The officeholder is also responsible for disclosure of campaign and lobbyist financial information, under the California Political Reform Act of 1974.

=== Corporations ===
The Office of the Secretary of State has a number of responsibilities related to corporations; the largest portion office is the Business Programs Division, which handles corporate filings. The Business Entities Section processes, files and maintains records related to corporations, limited liability companies, partnerships and other business entities conducting or planning to conduct business in California.

=== Registries ===
The office also maintains a number of registries, including the Safe at Home confidential address program and the Domestic Partners and Advance Health Care Directive. Other roles of the secretary of state include safeguarding the California State Archives and sitting on the board of trustees of the California Museum, though the officeholder has not been responsible for the California State Library since 1862.

=== Organization ===
The Secretary of State's Office is divided into six main divisions:

- Executive Division, which also includes the Office of Elections Cybersecurity and the Office of Voting Systems Technology Assessment.
- Elections Division
- Political Reform Division, which maintains the registry of lobbyists, campaign finances, etc.
- Management Services Division, which includes accounting, human resources, building operations, etc.
- Business Programs Division, which handles the registration of companies, notary services, etc.
- State Archives, which also administers the State Museum that is a part of the Secretary of State's headquarters in downtown Sacramento.

The Secretary of State's Office also works in conjunction with the state Voting Modernization Board.

== List of secretaries of state of California ==
#	Image	Name	Term of office	Party
1		William Van Voorhies	1849–1853	Democratic
		James W. Denver	1853–1855	Democratic
3		Charles H. Hempstead	1855–1856	Democratic
4		David F. Douglass	1856–1858	American
5		Ferris Foreman	1858–1860	Democratic
6		Johnson Price	1860–1862	Democratic
7		William H. Weeks	1862–1863	Republican
8		A. A. H. Tuttle	1863	Republican
9		Benjamin B. Redding	1863–1867	Unionist Republican
10		Henry L. Nichols	1867–1871	Democratic
11		Drury Melone	1871–1875	Republican
12		Thomas Beck	1875–1880	Democratic
13		Daniel M. Burns	1880–1883	Republican
14		Thomas Larkin Thompson	1883–1887	Democratic
15		William C. Hendricks	1887–1891	Democratic
16		Edwin G. Waite	1891–1894	Republican
17		Albert Hart	1894–1895	Republican
18		Lewis H. Brown	1895–1899	Republican
19		Charles F. Curry	1899–1911	Republican
20		Frank C. Jordan	1911–1940	Republican
21		Paul Peek	1940–1943	Democratic
22		Frank M. Jordan	1943–1970	Republican
Acting		H. P. Sullivan	1970–1971	Republican
23		Jerry Brown	1971–1975	Democratic
24		March Fong Eu	1975–1994	Democratic
Acting		Tony Miller	1994–1995	Democratic
25		Bill Jones	1995–2003	Republican
26		Kevin Shelley	2003–2005	Democratic
Acting		Cathy Mitchell	2005	Democratic
27		Bruce McPherson	2005–2007	Republican
28		Debra Bowen	2007–2015	Democratic
29		Alex Padilla	2015–2021	Democratic
Acting		James Schwab	2021	Democratic
30		Shirley Weber	2021–present	Democratic

== See also ==
- Government of California
- Politics of California
- Impeachment in California
