= List of mayors of Sacramento, California =

Mayor of Sacramento
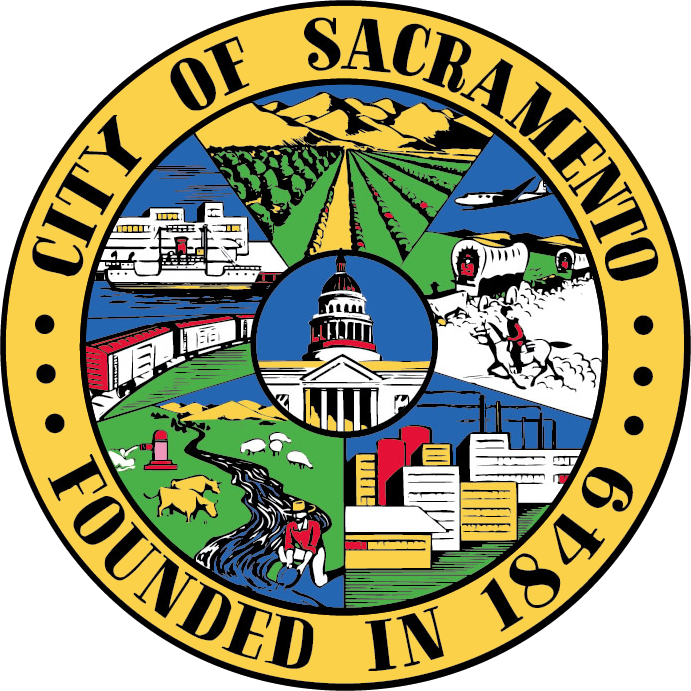
- Seal of the City of Sacramento

- Flag of the City of Sacramento

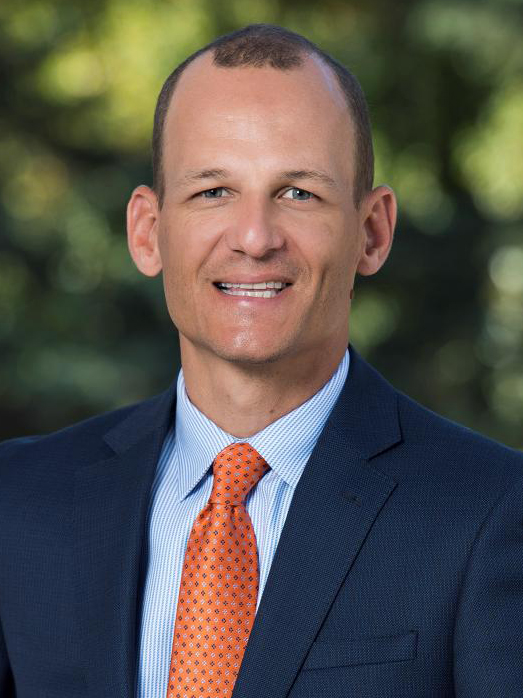
- Incumbent; Kevin McCarty since December 10, 2024
- Type: Mayor
- Formation: 1849
- First holder: William Stout

This is a list of mayors of Sacramento, California. The Sacramento City Council met for the first time on August 1, 1849, and the citizens approved the city charter on October 13, 1849. The City Charter was recognized by the State of California on February 27, 1850, and Sacramento was incorporated on March 18, 1850.

List of mayors of Sacramento
#	Image	Mayor	Term start	Term end	Notes and references
1		William Stout	1849		Spent three weeks in office
2		Albert Maver Winn	1849		
3		Hardin Bigelow	April 1, 1850	November 1850	The first elected mayor of Sacramento
4		James Richmond Hardenberg	November 1850	1851	
5		C. I. Hutchinson	1852		
6		James Richmond Hardenberg	1853		
7		R. P. Johnson	1854		
8		James Lawrence English	1855		Later served as the California State Treasurer
9		Benjamin Barnard Redding	1856	1857	Born in Canada
10		Joseph P. Dyer	1857		
11		Henry Lambard Nichols	1858		Later served as Secretary of State of California
12		William Shattuck	1859	1862	
13		Charles Heman	1863	1871	
14		Christopher Green	1872	1877	
15		Jabez Turner	1878	1880	Elected on what was known as the State Workingmen's ticket
16		John Q. Brown	1881	1887	Father of mayor John Q. Brown (1918–1920)
17		Eugene J. Gregory	1887	1888	
18		William D. Comstock	1889	1892	
19		Bernard U. Steinman	1893	1895	First Jewish mayor of Sacramento
20		Cyrus H. Hubbard	1896	1897	
21		William Land	1898	1899	
22		George H. Clark	1900	1903	
23		William J. Hassett	1904	1905	
24		Marshall R. Beard	1906	1907	
25		Clinton L. White	1908	1909	
26		Marshall R. Beard	1910	1912	
27		Michael J. Burke	1912	1915	
28		Gustavaus C. Simmons	1915	1916	
29		Daniel W. Carmichael	1916	1918	
30		John Q. Brown	1918	1920	Son of former mayor John Q. Brown (1881–1887)
31		Charles A. Bliss	1920	1921	
32		Albert Elkus	1921	1925	First mayor to be born within city boundaries
33		Alexander E. Goddard	1926	1927	
34		Ralph E. Conley	1928	1928	Resigned effective October 15, 1928
35		Martin I. Welsh	1928	1930	Ran for Lieutenant Governor of California in 1930
36		C. H. S. Bidwell	1930	1933	
37		Thomas P. Scollan	1934	1935	
38		Arthur D. Ferguson	1936	1937	
39		Thomas B. Monk	1938	1945	
40		George L. Klumpp	1946	1947	
41		Belle Cooledge	1948	1949	First female mayor
42		Bert E. Geisreiter	1950	1951	
43		Leslie E. Wood	1952	1953	
44		William A. Hicks	1954		Resigned from office
45		H. H. Hendren	1954	1955	
46		Clarence L. Azevedo	1956	1959	
47		James B. McKenney	1960	1965	
48		Walter Christensen	1966	1967	
49		Richard H. Marriott	1968	1975	
50		Phil Isenberg	1975	1982	Later served in the California State Assembly
51		R. Burnett Miller	1983		
52		Anne Rudin	1983	January 2, 1993	First elected female mayor in Sacramento
53		Joe Serna, Jr.	January 2, 1993	November 7, 1999	First Hispanic-American to be elected as mayor (died in office)
Vacant			November 7, 1999	December 14, 1999	
–		Jimmie R. Yee (interim)	December 14, 1999	November 27, 2000	First Asian-American mayor
54		Heather Fargo	November 27, 2000	December 2, 2008	Second elected female mayor in Sacramento
55		Kevin Johnson	December 2, 2008	December 13, 2016	First African-American mayor and former NBA player
56		Darrell Steinberg	December 13, 2016	December 10, 2024	
57		Kevin McCarty	December 10, 2024	Incumbent	

== See also ==
- Timeline of Sacramento, California
