= Faces (gay club) =

Gay club in Sacramento, California, United States

- Interactive map of Faces
- Address: 2000 K St.
- Location: Sacramento, California, U.S.
- Coordinates: 38°34′31″N 121°28′49″W
- Type: Gay bar; nightclub

Construction
- Opened: 1985

Website
- faces.net

Faces is a gay club located at 2000 K St., Sacramento, CA. It was founded in 1985.

== History ==
Faces was opened in 1985 under the auspices of Myron "Terry" Sidie. It was one of Sacramento's original gay nightclubs. In 2007, Faces became Northern California's largest nightclub with an expansion that added five more bars, another dance floor, and VIP areas, for a total of 15 bars, three dance floors, and an outdoor pool.

In 2022, Faces was listed for sale by Bay Area-based real estate investment firm Global I.N. Inc. at $2.75 million, as Sidie decided to retire from the nightclub world.
