= Tahoe Park, Sacramento, California =

Tahoe Park
- Neighborhood of Sacramento
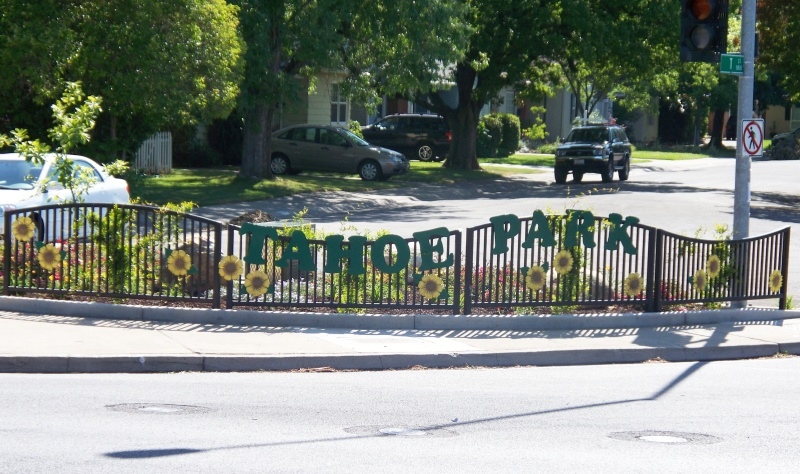
- The 59th & T Street gateway to Tahoe Park

- Location within Sacramento Tahoe Park (California) Tahoe Park (the United States)
- Coordinates: 38.543611°N 121.435278°W
- Country: United States
- State: California
- County: Sacramento
- City: Sacramento
- Time zone: UTC−8 (Pacific)
  - Summer (DST): UTC−7 (PDT)
- Zip Codes: 95817 and 95820

Tahoe Park is a neighborhood located within the city of Sacramento, California.

The name "Tahoe Park" is generally used to refer to several official and unofficial neighborhoods that surround Tahoe Park proper, including Tahoe Park East, Tahoe Park South, Tahoe Terrace, and West Tahoe Park.

== Geography ==
=== Location ===
The neighborhood of Tahoe Park is centrally located in Sacramento, immediately south of U.S. Route 50 at 59th Street.

The area is less than 1-mile (1.6 km) southwest of California State University, Sacramento, less than 1-mile (1.6 km) east of the UC Davis Medical Center and approximately 4 miles (6.4 km) southeast of downtown Sacramento.

=== Areas ===
==== Tahoe Park ====
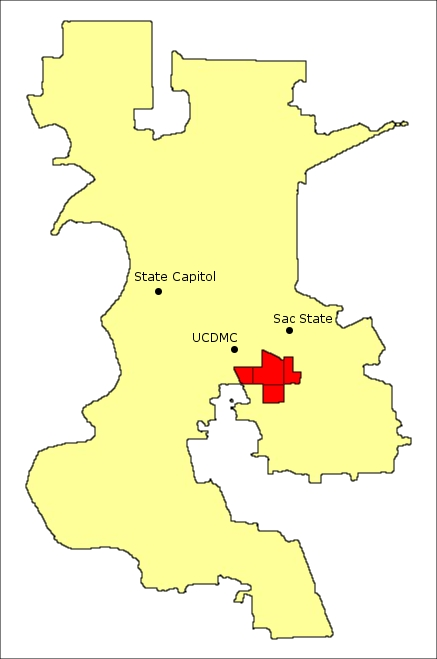
Map of Tahoe Park neighborhoods relative to the city of Sacramento and notable landmarks

Tahoe Park is an officially recognized neighborhood in Area 3 of the City of Sacramento. It is bordered by Highway 50 and Broadway to the north, 14th Avenue to the south, 53rd and 57th Streets to the west, and 65th Street to the east.

The section of Tahoe Park that is north of Broadway is informally referred to as "Tahoe Terrace"; the name has its origins in a subdivision established in 1945.

==== Tahoe Park East ====
Tahoe Park East is an officially recognized neighborhood in Area 3 of the City of Sacramento. It is bordered by 65th Street to the west, Highway 50 and the Tahoe Tallac Little League Park to the north, Business Drive to the east, and 14th Avenue to the south.

==== Tahoe Park South ====
Tahoe Park South is an officially recognized neighborhood in Area 3 of the City of Sacramento. It is bordered by 14th Avenue to the north, 21st Avenue to the south, 58th Street to the west, and the 65th Street Expressway to the east.

Many long-time residents refer to Tahoe Park South as "Tallac Village" —most likely due to the presence of the Tallac Village Shopping Center on its northern boundary. However, Tallac Village is an officially recognized neighborhood immediately south of Tahoe Park South, between 21st Avenue and Fruitridge Road.

==== West Tahoe Park ====
West Tahoe Park is an officially recognized neighborhood in Area 3 of the City of Sacramento. It is bordered by Broadway to the north, 14th Avenue to the south, Stockton Boulevard to the west and 53rd Street to the east.

Prior to 2005, the area west of 53rd Street was officially recognized as a part of the neighborhood of Tahoe Park proper. However, the term "West Tahoe Park" was commonly used to describe the area which, at that time, was in Sacramento's 5th district. In approximately 2005, the West Tahoe Park neighborhood was officially recognized as a separate neighborhood by the city of Sacramento. During redistricting that occurred in 2011, West Tahoe Park joined the rest of the Tahoe Park neighborhoods in District 6. By and large, this area of the Tahoe Park neighborhood is located closest to the UC Davis Medical Center.

==== Tahoe Terrace ====
Tahoe Terrace is a name used to refer to the section of Tahoe Park north of Broadway. The name comes from the 1945-era subdivision established north of Broadway, between 61st and 63rd Streets.

Tahoe Terrace was a part of Sacramento's old "Area 1" that included the nearby neighborhoods of East Sacramento and Elmhurst. Tahoe Terrace can also be distinguished from the rest of Tahoe Park by its postal code, 95817; all other areas of Tahoe Park proper are located within the 95820 postal code.

=== Parks ===
==== Tahoe Park ====
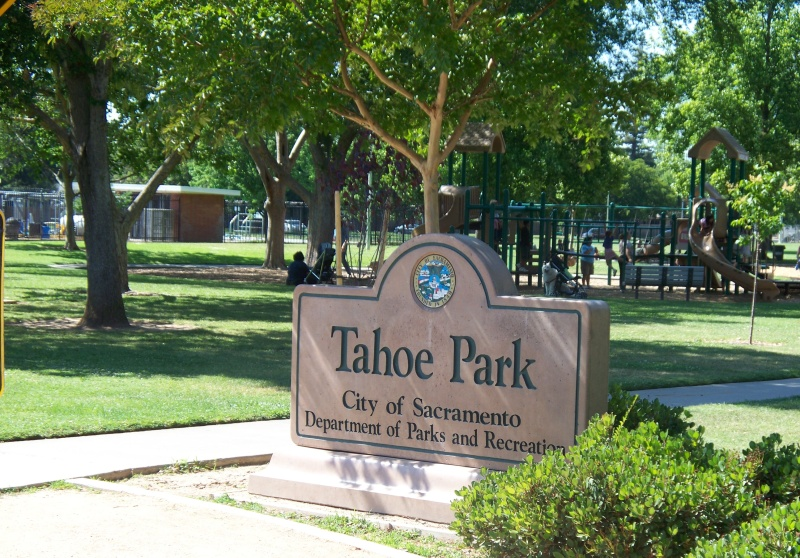
Tahoe Park

The area is named for the park in the heart of the neighborhood. Tahoe Park is a 19-acre (77,000 m^{2}) recreational facility located in the Tahoe Park neighborhood of Sacramento, California. The park is largely contained between 8th Avenue to the north, 11th Avenue to the south, 59th Street to the west, and 61st Street to the east.

The park contains many popular amenities, including a swimming pool, a wading pool, playgrounds for children and toddlers, several barbecue facilities, and playing fields for softball, soccer, basketball, volleyball, and horseshoes.

The park has received many updates in the 1990s and 2000s, including street lights, a jogging trail, upgraded picnic areas, and fitness stations.

==== Mae Fong Park ====
Mae Fong Park is a 3.25-acre (13,200 m^{2}) park in the Tahoe Park East neighborhood. It was officially opened in October 2010 using the temporary/working name of "Redding Avenue Park", but an effort to rename it began almost immediately, as Mae Lillian Fong, a longtime businesswoman and community leader who co-founded and operated a printing company on a nearby parcel, had recently died. The City of Sacramento officially named the park after her in August 2011.

== History ==
=== Early years ===
In the early 1900s, the area southeast of the old California State Fairgrounds (now the UC Davis Medical Center campus) was sparsely populated farmland; most residential neighborhoods were west of Upper Stockton Road (now Stockton Boulevard).

In 1911, Sacramento made its first annexation. Tripling in size from its original grid area, the city expanded its city limits southward to Sutterville Road and 14th Avenue, and eastward to Elvas Avenue and 65th Street. This placed the area now known as Tahoe Park (proper) at the city's far southeastern corner just south of Folsom Boulevard.

By 1926, Folsom Boulevard was a part of the newly established US Route 50, a highway that continues eastward in California from Sacramento to Lake Tahoe. In 1931, to serve the needs of the residents, a four-room elementary school was built at 5932 5th Avenue; it was named "Tahoe School". Seven years later, in 1938, the school address was modified to reflect the change of the street's name to "Broadway". Records from 1939 identify new tract homes under construction near the intersection of 55th Street and 8th Avenue.

=== Post-World War II growth ===
With three military bases in the area (Mather Field, McClellan Field, and the Sacramento Signal Depot), Sacramento was a popular place for service men and women to live. The area experienced a housing boom during and after World War II; a large number of homes were financed by the G.I. Bill.

The area grew rapidly during this time. In 1946, the City of Sacramento purchased 19 acres (77,000 m^{2}) of land immediately south of the Tahoe Elementary School for use as a recreational facility; the park was named "Tahoe Park" after the school. The same year, All Hallows Parish moved from a storefront on Stockton Boulevard to its current location at 55th Street and 14th Avenue.

In 1948, Sacramento annexed a large area southeast of 14th Avenue and Stockton Boulevard, including the area now known as Tahoe Park South. The same year, educational options grew in Tahoe Park to meet the needs of area families. The Tahoe Elementary School campus was expanded with new buildings, and the All Hallows Parrish Catholic School (now John Paul II Catholic School) was opened.

In 1958, the neighborhood's youngest area—Tahoe Park East—was added to Sacramento when the city annexed an area northeast of 14th Avenue and 65th Street.

=== 1970s/1980s decline ===
The area experienced economic changes from the 1960s through the 1980s. Due to several factors—including the rerouting of Highway 99 away from Stockton Boulevard in 1962, the relocation of the state fairgrounds in 1968, and the establishment of new suburbs further away from the city's core—the area entered a state of decline in the 1970s and 1980s.

=== 1990s to present ===
In 1990, residents created the Tahoe Park Neighborhood Association (TPNA), a non-profit organization focused on community improvement. The organization worked on behalf of many community concerns, including traffic, absentee landlords, and crime.

By 1995, the community's activism and civic participation had created a noticeable impact on the neighborhood, resulting in a resurgence for the area. Beginning in the 2000s, additional organizations arose to represent the interests of area residents. First-time home buyers and real estate professionals view Tahoe Park as a desirable alternative to pricier neighborhoods such as East Sacramento and Midtown.

== Demographics ==
Demographic data including population density, median household income, median rent, the number and gender of residents, median age of residents, average estimated value of detached houses, most popular occupation, and ethnicity are available for Tahoe Park and its adjoining neighborhoods.

Tahoe Park Demographic Stats based on 2016 data
Neighborhood	Area in square miles	Population	Population Density of people per square mile	Median Annual Household Income	Median Age		Most popular occupation		Educational Attainment			Ethnic make-up					
Neighborhood	Area in square miles	Population	Population Density of people per square mile	Median Annual Household Income	Male	Female	Male	Female	No HS diploma	HS diploma	Higher Degree	White	Hispanic	Black	Asian	Mixed	Other
Tahoe Park proper	0.613	3,294	5,370	$55,803	38.6	44.2	Construction	Sales	8.1%	50.6%	41.3%	66.2%	18.5%	5.3%	5.7%	4.2%	0.2%
Tahoe Park East	0.330	2,624	7,948	$61,049	37.0	40.9	Sales	Service Industry	7.9%	46.8%	45.3%	41.4%	29.6%	13.9%	12.0%	2.7%	0.3%
Tahoe Park South	0.288	1,622	5,627	$47,039	35.5	36.2	Sales	Sales	13.3%	44.9%	41.9%	67.0%	25.5%	1.9%	1.2%	3.8%	0.5%
West Tahoe Park	0.202	975	4,829	$50,302	38.1	49.2	-		8.5%	56.5%	35.0%	45.1%	19.4%	15.8%	4.1%	8.3%	7.2%

=== Events ===
In 1994, the Folklore De Sacramento performed a traditional Mexican dance celebrating the Colonial Heights library's 5-year anniversary; the closest library to the Tahoe Park neighborhood.

== Politics ==
=== Government ===
Tahoe Park neighborhoods are represented by the following government districts:

- Sacramento City Council: Sacramento City District 6
- Sacramento County Board of Supervisors: Sacramento County District 1
- California State Legislature: 7th Assembly District; 6th Senate District
- United States House of Representatives: California's 6th congressional district, represented by Democrat Ami Bera

=== Representatives past and present ===
In the late 1980s, Tahoe Park began to produce many of Sacramento's government officials; U.S. Federal District Judge Kim Mueller, former California State Senate President Pro Tem and current Mayor Darrell Steinberg, California Insurance Commissioner Dave Jones, Assembly Member Kevin McCarty, and Council Member Eric Guerra established their political careers on the Sacramento City Council while residents of Tahoe Park.

=== Tahoe Park Neighborhood Association ===
The mission of the Tahoe Park Neighborhood Association is to improve the quality of life in the Tahoe Park Neighborhood, to serve as a liaison between neighborhood and local government and to provide a non-partisan forum for discussion of neighborhood concerns of mutual interest. TPNA holds public board meetings every first Monday of the month at 7 pm at the Tahoe Community Center located at 5959 8th Avenue, Sacramento.
