= 2024 Sacramento mayoral election =

Sacramento mayoral election, 2024
- March 5, 2024 (primary); November 5, 2024 (general)
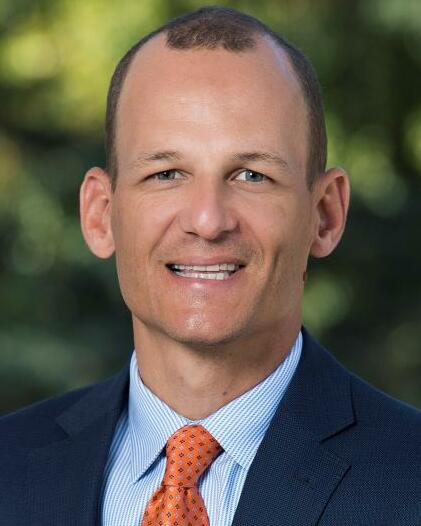

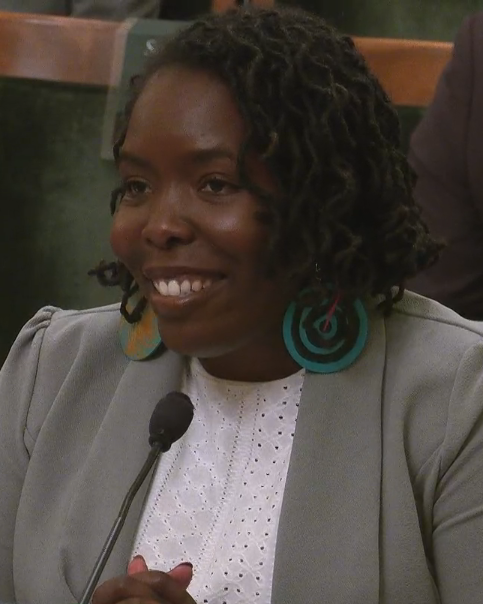

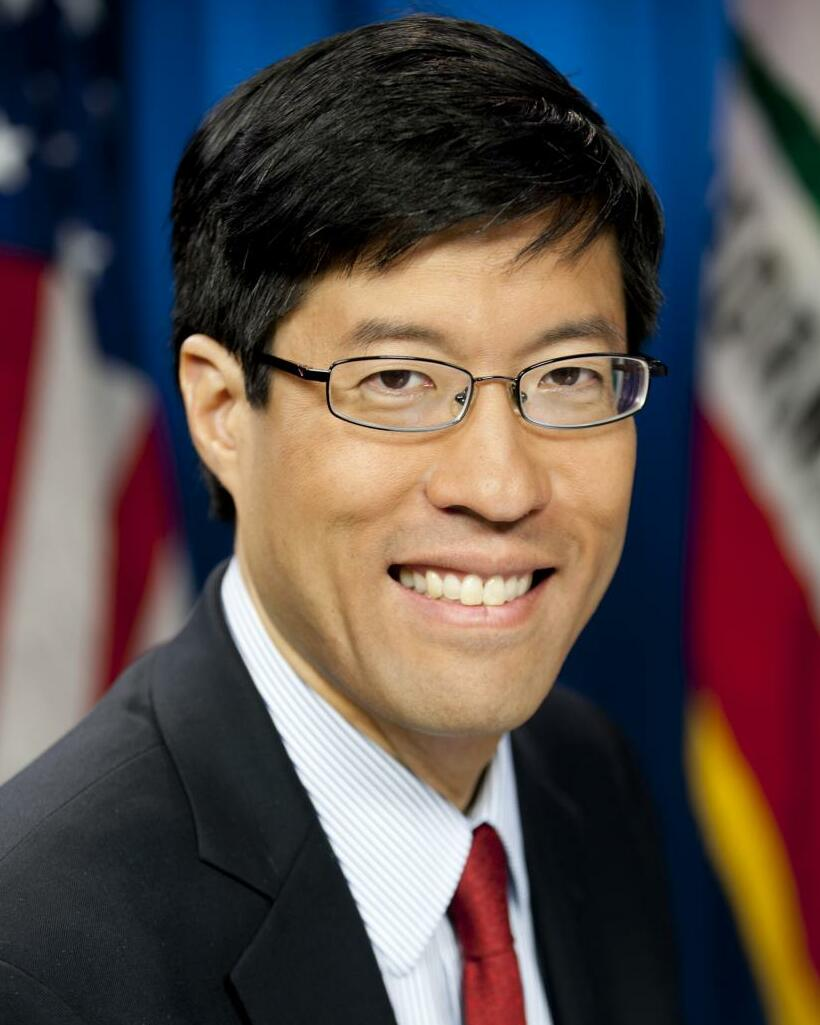

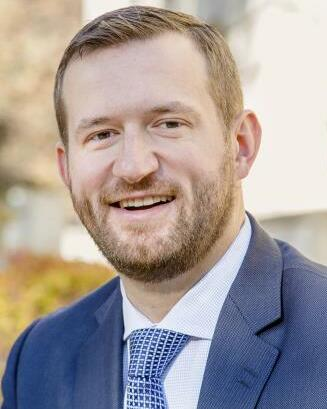
Candidate	Kevin McCarty	Flojaune Cofer
Primary election	22,302; 21.8%	30,372; 28.3%
General election	96,433; 50.7%	94,495; 49.3%
Candidate	Richard Pan	Steve Hansen
Primary election	22,010; 21.6%	21,684; 21.2%
General election	Eliminated	Eliminated
- Results by precinct McCarty: 50–60% 60–70% 70–80% 80–90% Cofer: 50–60% 60–70% 70–80% >90% Tie: 50% No data
Mayor before election
Darrell Steinberg
Elected mayor
Kevin McCarty

The 2024 Sacramento mayoral election was held on March 5, 2024, with a runoff scheduled for November 5 because no candidate received more than 50% of the vote in the primary election. It will elect the mayor of Sacramento, California. Municipal elections in California are officially nonpartisan.

Epidemiologist Flojaune Cofer took the first spot in the general election, with state assemblyman Kevin McCarty narrowly beating out former state senator Richard Pan and former city councilor Steve Hansen for the second spot. The Sacramento Bee identified Cofer as the most progressive candidate in the race, with McCarty as the "second most progressive," Pan as the "second most moderate," and Hansen as the "most moderate."

The general election was so close that no winner was declared for nearly a month. Ultimately, McCarty was certified as the winner on December 2, defeating Cofer by a margin of 1.4%. McCarty took office as the 57th mayor of Sacramento on December 10, 2024.

== Background ==
Incumbent Mayor Darrell Steinberg was first elected as Sacramento mayor in 2016 and reelected in 2020. In 2020, he said he did not plan to seek a third term in office, even though his Strong-mayor ballot measure would have allowed him to seek a third term since it would not apply to his first term, which had occurred before its intended passage. However, since Measure A was voted down by 57% of Sacramento voters, he would be able to run for a third term regardless.

In February 2023, he stated that he was "officially undecided" and that he was "holding the option open". His Chief of Staff Mary Lynne Vellinga stated that he would make his announcement by the end of May 2023. On May 23, he announced that he was instead considering to run for the office of California Attorney General.

== Candidates ==
=== Advanced to general election ===
- Flojaune Cofer, epidemiologist and former chair of Sacramento's Measure U Community Advisory Committee (2019–2022)
- Kevin McCarty, California state assemblyman from the 6th district (2014–present) and former city councilor from the 6th district (2010–2014)

=== Eliminated in primary ===
- Jose Avina, fitness business owner and U.S. Marine Corps veteran
- Julius Engel, asset protection manager and disbarred lawyer
- Steve Hansen, former city councilor from the 4th district (2012–2020)
- Richard Pan, former California state senator from the 6th district (2014–2022)

=== Withdrawn ===
- Maggy Krell, Planned Parenthood California chief legal counsel (ran for state assembly)

=== Declined ===
- Eric Guerra, city councilor from the 6th district (2015–present) and runner-up for AD-10 in 2022 (ran for re-election)
- Jeff Harris, former city councilor from the 3rd district (2014–2022) (endorsed Hansen)
- Darrell Steinberg, incumbent mayor (2016–present) (endorsed McCarty in the general election)

== Primary election ==
=== Endorsements ===
Flojaune Cofer

Local officials

- Bridgette Dean, former director of the Sacramento Department of Community Response (2020–2022)
- Katie Valenzuela, city councilor from the 4th district (2020–present)
- Mai Vang, city councilor from the 8th district (2020–present)

Newspapers and other media

- The Sacramento Bee

Labor unions

- Los Rios College Federation of Teachers (AFT Local 2279)
- National Nurses United and California Nurses Association
- National Union of Healthcare Workers (co-endorsed with McCarty)
- Sacramento City Teachers Association
- SEIU United Healthcare Workers West (co-endorsed with McCarty)
- Service Employees International Union Locals 1021 and 2015

Organizations

- Black Women Organized for Political Action Sacramento County
- National Women's Political Caucus Sacramento
- Our Revolution
- Sacramento Democratic Socialists of America
- Sunrise Movement Sacramento
- Wellstone Progressive Democrats of Sacramento (Note: Affiliate of Our Revolution.)

Political parties

- California Working Families Party
Steve Hansen

Local officials

- Eric Guerra, city councilor from the 6th district (2015–present)
- Jeff Harris, former city councilor from the 3rd district (2014–2022)
- Lisa Kaplan, city councilor from the 1st district (2022–present)
- Annise Parker, former Mayor of Houston (2010–2016) and president of LGBTQ Victory Fund

Labor unions

- Sacramento Police Officers Association and Deputy Sheriffs Association (endorsed McCarty in the general election)

Organizations

- Equality California
- LGBTQ Victory Fund
- Sacramento Association of Realtors
- Sacramento Metropolitan Chamber of Commerce PAC
- Sacramento Stonewall Democrats
Kevin McCarty

Local officials

- Caity Maple, vice mayor of Sacramento (2024–present) from the 5th district (2022–present)
- Karina Talamantes, mayor pro tempore of Sacramento (2024–present) from the 3rd district (2022–present)

Labor unions

- International Association of Fire Fighters Local 522
- International Brotherhood of Electrical Workers Local 340
- National Union of Healthcare Workers (co-endorsed with Cofer)
- Sacramento Central Labor Council
- SEIU United Healthcare Workers West (co-endorsed with Cofer)
Richard Pan

State legislators

- Angelique Ashby, state senator from the 8th district (2022–present)

Municipal officials

- Thien Ho, Sacramento County District Attorney (2023–present) (endorsed McCarty in the general election)
- Jimmie Yee, former Sacramento County supervisor from the 2nd district (2007–2015) and former interim mayor of Sacramento (1999–2000)

Labor unions

- AFSCME Union of American Physicians and Dentists

Organizations

- Sacramento District Dental Society PAC

=== Results ===
Primary results by precinct Cofer: 20–30%; 30–40%; 40–50%; 50–60%; McCarty: 20–30%; 30–40%; Pan: 20–30%; 30–40%; 40–50%; Hansen: 20–30%; 30–40%; Tie: 30–40%; 50%; No data

2024 Sacramento mayoral primary election
Candidate	Votes	%
Flojaune Cofer	30,372	28.3
Kevin McCarty	22,302	21.8
Richard Pan	22,010	21.6
Steve Hansen	21,684	21.2
Jose Avina	6,217	6.05
Julius Engel	1,013	0.99
Total votes	103,408	100.00

== General election ==
=== Endorsements ===
Flojaune Cofer

Newspapers and other media

- The Sacramento Observer

Labor unions

- Communications Workers of America Local 9119
- Los Rios College Federation of Teachers (AFT Local 2279)

Organizations

- 314 Action
- College Democrats at Sacramento State
- Sacramento Area Peace Action
- Sierra Club Mother Lode Chapter and Sacramento Group

Political parties

- Sacramento County Green Party
- Peace and Freedom Party
Kevin McCarty

U.S. representatives

- Ami Bera, U.S. Representative from California's 6th congressional district (2013–present)

Municipal officials

- Thien Ho, Sacramento County District Attorney (2023–present) (previously endorsed Pan)

Local officials

- Darrell Steinberg, outgoing mayor of Sacramento (2016–present)

Labor unions

- International Association of Sheet Metal, Air, Rail and Transportation Workers Local 104
- Sacramento Police Officers Association (previously endorsed Hansen)
Declined to endorse

Political parties

- Sacramento County Democratic Party

=== Results ===
2024 Sacramento mayoral general election
Candidate	Votes	%
Kevin McCarty	96,433	50.70
Flojaune Cofer	94,495	49.30
Total votes	190,928	100.00
