= Mai Vang =

American politician (born 1985)

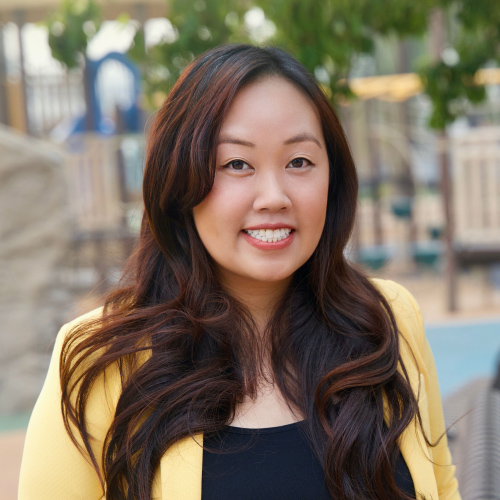

Member of the Sacramento City Council from the 8th district
- Incumbent
- Assumed office December 15, 2020
- Preceded by: Larry Carr

Personal details
- Born: Mai Yang Vang; 1984 or 1985 (age 41–42) Sacramento, California, U.S.
- Party: Democratic
- Spouse: Omar Gonzalez (m. 2024)
- Education: University of San Francisco (BS); University of California, Los Angeles (MA, MPH)
- Website: Campaign website

Mai Yang Vang (born 1984 or 1985) is an American politician who has served on the Sacramento, California, City Council since 2020. A member of the Democratic Party, she represents the 8th district and is the first Asian-American woman and first person of Hmong descent elected to the body.

As of 2026, she is running for the U.S. House of Representatives, challenging incumbent Democrat Doris Matsui to represent California's 7th congressional district with the endorsement of the Sacramento chapter of the Democratic Socialists of America.

== Early life and education ==
Vang was born in Sacramento, California, to Hmong refugees from Laos who fled after the Vietnam War. She is the eldest of 16 children and grew up impoverished in the Meadowview and Oak Park neighborhoods. Vang's family relied on food stamps, government safety net programs, and the Salvation Army for resources.

Vang graduated from Sacramento High School and holds bachelor's degrees in biology and sociology from the University of San Francisco. In 2011, she completed a joint Master of Arts and Masters of Public Health in Asian American Studies program at the University of California, Los Angeles.

== Early career ==
In 2013, Vang co-founded Hmong Innovating Politics to organize the South Sacramento Hmong community, register voters, and mobilize residents and parents against school closures, after multiple such closures in the area. Now the organization focuses on voter engagement, youth leadership, parent engagement, and coalition building across the state.

Vang began lecturing in the Department of Ethnic Studies at California State University, Sacramento in August 2015, a position she still holds. She also taught in the Department of Asian American Studies at the University of California, Davis.

== Political career ==
=== Sacramento City Unified School District School Board ===
In 2016, Vang was elected to represent the Area 5 seat on the Sacramento City Unified School District school board. As a school board member, Vang spoke out about issues affecting communities of color and low income kids in Meadowview. She co-led the effort to pass the first ever Safe Haven resolution in SCUSD and was instrumental in passing Ethnic Studies as a high school requirement. During her tenure on the school board, she was a vocal advocate against the school-to-prison pipeline and consistently raised concerns about the presence of police officers on school grounds.

=== 2020 Sacramento City Council campaign ===
In 2020, Vang successfully won a seat on the Sacramento City Council representing District 8, the neighborhoods of Meadowview and South Sacramento. Vang highlighted affordable housing, public health, and her district becoming integral in the farm to fork movement. Vang received endorsements from 4 councilmembers including retiring council member Larry Carr and Angelique Ashby; the city firefighters’ union; assemblymembers Anthony Rendon, David Chiu, and California State Controller Betty Yee; California State Treasurer Fiona Ma; U.S. Senator Bernie Sanders; and the editorial board of the Sacramento Bee.

Her campaign had raised $122,000 by February 2020. In the first round, Vang placed first, leading pastor Les Simmons with 47% of the vote. She defeated Simmons in a run-off election with 52% of the vote. She is the first Asian-American woman elected to the body and was sworn in on December 15, 2020.

She won re-election in 2024 unopposed.

=== Sacramento Council member ===
During Vang's tenure on the Sacramento City Council, the city established the first-ever Sacramento Children’s Fund, dedicating $10 million annually to support children and youth impacted by poverty, violence, and trauma. Vang lead the effort to secure the first-ever city-wide language access coordinator to make sure government was accessible to everyday people. Vang secured over $40 million in public investments to strengthen neighborhoods and improve the quality of life for youth, seniors, and families.

In 2022, a man was arrested and charged for making threats of death or serious injury against Vang and another council member, as well as a candidate and a staff member.

In 2023, Vang voted to shift $6 million away from the Sacramento City police overtime and unfilled vacancies, and reallocate the money into expanding the hours of the homeless behavioral health department which only operates Monday through Friday during regular business hours. The proposal was rejected by a majority of the council, but a similar proposal was made again in 2025. In 2025, an analysis showed that the police overtime spending increased from $2.6 million in 2011 to $23 million in 2023, and was a total of $36 million over-budget from 2021-2023.

In 2024, Vang and Vice Mayor Karina Talamantes worked with the community to support and secure funding for city library services through Measure E.

Vang endorsed Flojaune Cofer's eventually unsuccessful run in the 2024 Sacramento mayoral election.

Vang was the only council member to vote against the renewal of the controversial ShotSpotter detection technology. Studies from Houston, New York City, and other jurisdictions have found up to 87% false positive rates, contributing to increased police costs and also response times for actual emergencies.

=== 2026 U.S. House campaign ===
In September 2025, Vang announced her campaign for the U.S. House of Representatives in 2026, challenging incumbent Democrat Doris Matsui in the 7th district. She was endorsed by organizations including the California Working Families Party, Justice Democrats, Sunrise Movement, Sacramento Democratic Socialists of America, and the newspaper The Sacramento Bee.

If elected, Vang would be the first Hmong American in Congress. Her decision to run was motivated by her opposition to the increase in Immigration and Customs Enforcement activity in the region. In March 2026, Sacramento-based platinum funk rock band Cake performed a benefit concert in support of the congressional campaigns of Vang and Effie Phillips-Staley. Lead singer John McCrea, Vang, and Phillips-Staley attended the same high school, though not at the same time.

During a May 20, 2026 Joint Special Meeting of the Sacramento County Board of Supervisors and the Sacramento City Council, Vang remained turned away from the American flag and did not recite the Pledge of Allegiance, as recorded in video footage published on the City of Sacramento's official website. The incident led to the resurfacing of multiple videos showing Vang turning away or remaining silent during city council meetings while members recited the Pledge of Allegiance. Vang had previously addressed the practice in a February 4, 2025 Facebook post, stating that she uses the moment to reflect on injustices affecting communities locally and globally, and that she views the gesture as a form of resistance against complacency.

== Electoral history ==
=== 2020 ===
Sacramento City Council election, District 8
Primary election
Party	Candidate	Votes	%
Nonpartisan	Mai Vang	4,705	47
Nonpartisan	Les Simmons	3,309	33
Nonpartisan	Santiago Morales	713	7
Nonpartisan	Ronald Bell	662	6
Nonpartisan	Daphne Harris	522	5
Total votes		9,911	100
General election
Nonpartisan	Mai Vang	10,225	52
Nonpartisan	Les Simmons	9,386	47
Total votes		19,611	100

=== 2024 ===
Sacramento City Council election, District 8
Party	Candidate	Votes	%
Nonpartisan	Mai Vang (incumbent)	6,017	100
Total votes		6,017	100

=== 2026 ===
2026 California's 7th congressional district election
Primary election
Party	Candidate	Votes	%
Democratic	Mai Vang	65,617	31.2
Democratic	Doris Matsui (incumbent)	61,114	29.1
Republican	Zachariah Wooden	45,994	21.9
Republican	Ralph Nwobi	31,670	15.1
Democratic	Robby Morin	4,107	1.9
Democratic	Enayat Nazhat	1,613	0.8
Total votes		210,115	100.0

== Personal life ==
Vang resides in the Meadowview neighborhood of Sacramento. She married Omar Gonzalez, a second generation Mexican-American, in 2024.
