= Sacramento City Council =

City council; lawmaking body of the Sacramento City, USA

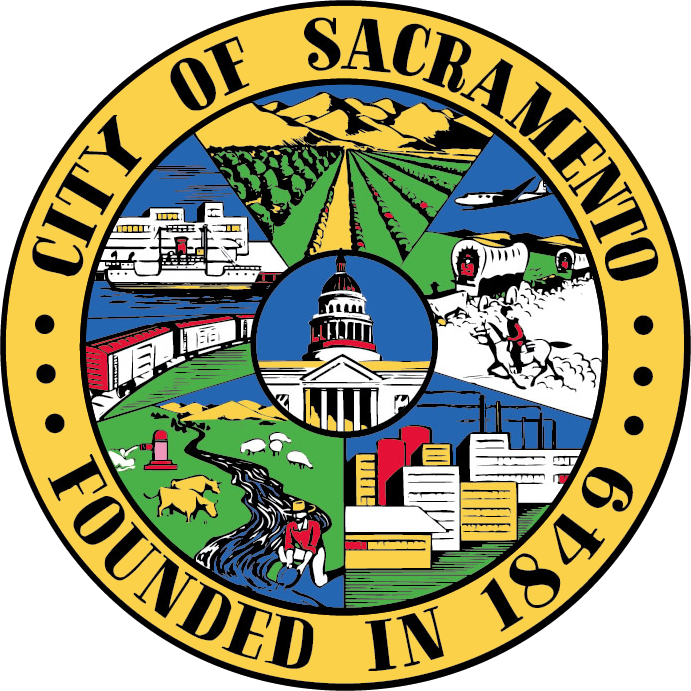

Type
- Type: Unicameral

History
- Founded: October 13, 1849
- New session started: December 15, 2020

Leadership
- Mayor of Sacramento: Kevin McCarty, Democratic
- Vice Mayor: Karina Talamantes, Democratic
- Mayor Pro Tem: Eric Guerra, Democratic

Structure
- Seats: 9 (8 city councilmembers with the mayor presiding with voting rights)
- Political groups: Democratic (9)
- Length of term: 4 years
- Salary: Councilmembers: $111,000 (annual); Mayor: $184,464 (annual)

Meeting place
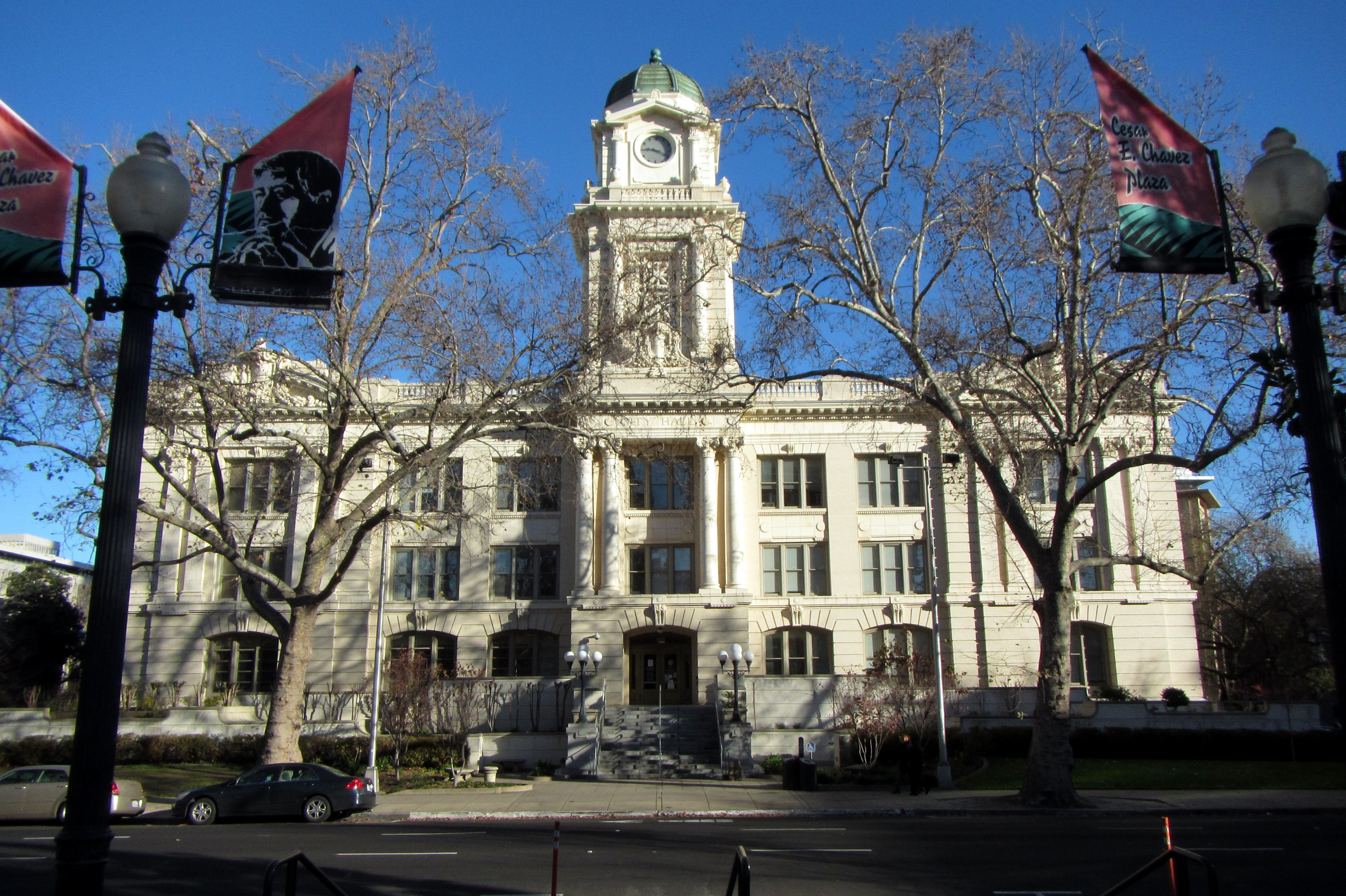
- Sacramento City Hall; Sacramento, California

Website
- Council Website

The Sacramento City Council is the governing body of the city of Sacramento, California. The council holds regular meetings at Sacramento City Hall on Tuesdays at 5:00 pm, with exceptions for holidays and other special cases.

Sacramento's city council is a nine-member mayor-council system of government. The council is composed of a mayor and eight council members, each of whom is elected to four-year terms from their respective districts. Sacramento's government is a "weak mayor" system in that the council retains executive and legislative authority. The management and operations of city affairs are not under the direct control of the mayor or the council; these matters are delegated to a city manager, who is appointed by Sacramento's Mayor and serves at the pleasure of the council.

== History ==
=== Previous councils ===
Sacramento, the oldest incorporated city in the State of California, has been governed by a council since the city's citizens approved a city charter in 1849. This charter, known as the "City Charter of 1850" in reference to the year that the charter was recognized by the California State Legislature, provided for the election of a ten-member "Common Council" made up of a Mayor and nine council members.

In 1858, the governments of Sacramento County and the City of Sacramento merged. As a result, Sacramento was governed by the Sacramento County Board of Directors (a predecessor to the Sacramento County Board of Supervisors) for the next five years.

The revised City Charter of 1863 returned to a separate governing body for the City of Sacramento. The charter established a four-member "Board of Trustees" composed of a Mayor and three trustees. Two more trustees were added to the board under the provisions of the City Charter of 1891. Later, in the City Charter of 1912, the five members of the city's governing body were renamed to "City Commissioners".

Revisions made in the City Charter of 1921 established a nine-member governing body, composed of a mayor and eight council members. The charter established the group's current nomenclature, the "City Council". Councilmembers were elected via a preferential voting system, in which all of Sacramento's electorate were allowed to vote for multiple candidates. Once elected, the council selected one of the councilmembers to serve a two-year term as the city's mayor.

=== Present council format ===
Since 1971, the city has been divided into eight council districts. Each district's boundaries are created using data from the United States Census so that each district contains a relatively equal number of citizens. Councilmembers, who must be residents of the districts that they are elected to, are selected by the voters of their respective districts for four-year terms. Unlike the previous system, the city's voters elect the city's mayor to a four-year term via a popular vote.

From the time that the district-based city council was established in 1971, the citizens of Sacramento have considered charters that proposed to consolidate the governments of Sacramento County and the City of Sacramento. On both occasions, in 1974 and again in 1990, the ballot measures were rejected by the citizens of both municipalities.

In 1971, all the seats were up for election as the district format was used for the first time. As a result, councilmembers in odd numbered districts were elected to six-year terms in 1971 that ended in 1977. Councilmembers in even numbered districts who were elected in 1987 and councilmembers in odd numbered districts that were elected in 1989 were elected to five-year terms that ended in November 1992 and November 1994 as the city switched to even year elections following those elections. All city council seats are nonpartisan.

== Council Districts ==
Sacramento's city district boundaries are defined in an effort to distribute the city's population evenly, as required by state and federal law. District boundaries are redrawn based on data from the United States Census. In April 2022, questions were raised when the City Attorney published an opinion stating that the City had incorrectly assigned constituencies in new districts to sitting councilmembers in the period between redistricting and elections, and that sitting councilmembers should instead represent the constituencies that originally elected them.

=== District 1 ===
District 1 Councilmembers
Name	In office
Lisa Kaplan	2022–present
Angelique Ashby	2010–2022
Ray Tretheway^{[a]}	2001–2010
Heather Fargo^{[b]}	1989–2000
David Shore	1981–1989
John Roberts	1977–1981
Manuel Ferrales	1971–1977

Sacramento's District 1 is located in the northwestern area of the city. District 1's neighborhoods include:

- North Natomas

Councilmember Lisa Kaplan represents District 1.

=== District 2 ===
District 2 Councilmembers
Name	In office
Roger Dickinson	2024–present
Shoun Thao^{[c]}	2024
"Sean" (Shahriar) Loloee^{[f]}	2020–2024
Allen Warren	2012–2020
Sandy Sheedy	2000–2012
Rob Kerth	1992–2000
Lyla Ferris	1987–1992
Charles Bradley^{[c]}	1987
Grantland Johnson^{[b]}	1983–1986
Blaine Fisher	1975–1983
Herman A. Lawson^{[c]}	1973–1975
Rosenwald Robertson^{[d]}	1971–1973

District 2 is located in the northeastern area of Sacramento. The district includes the neighborhoods of:

- Arden Fair
- Ben Ali
- Cannon Industrial Park
- Del Paso Heights
- Erikson Industrial Park
- Glenwood Meadows
- Hagginwood
- Noralto
- North Sacramento
- Parker Homes
- Robla
- Strawberry Manor
- Swanston Estates
- Woodlake
- Youngs Heights

Councilmember Roger Dickinson represents district 2.

=== District 3 ===
District 3 Councilmembers
Name	In office
Karina Talamantes	2022–present
Jeff Harris	2014–2022
Steve Cohn	1994–2014
Josh Pane	1989–1994
Doug Pope	1977–1989
R. Burnett Miller	1971–1977

District 3 covers the northern central area of Sacramento. Neighborhoods in District 3 include:

- Cal Expo
- CSUS
- Downtown Railyards
- Dos Rios Triangle
- East Sacramento
- Gardenland
- Northgate
- Point West
- River District
- River Park
- South Natomas

Councilmember Karina Talamantes represents district 3.

=== District 4 ===
District 4 Councilmembers
Name	In office
Phil Pluckebaum	2024–present
Katie Valenzuela	2020–2024
Steve Hansen	2012–2020
Robert Fong	2004–2012
Jimmy Yee	2000–2004
Joseph Yee^{[c]}	2000
Jimmy Yee^{[b]}	1992–1999
Tom Chinn	1983–1992
Anne Rudin	1971–1983

Sacramento's District 4 is located in the western central area of the city. District 4 neighborhoods include:

- Alhambra Triangle
- Downtown
- Freeport Manor
- Land Park
- Little Pocket
- Mangan Park
- Mansion Flats
- Marshall School
- Midtown
- New Era Park
- Newton Booth
- Poverty Ridge
- Richmond Grove
- South Land Park
- Southside Park
- Upper Land Park
- Winn Park/Capitol Avenue

Councilmember Phil Pluckebaum represents district 4 and defeated Katie Valenzuela in the March 2024 Primary.

=== District 5 ===
District 5 Councilmembers
Name	In office
Caity Maple	2022–present
Jay Schenirer	2010–2022
Lauren Hammond^{[a]}	1997–2010
Deborah Ortiz^{[a]}^{[b]}	1993–1996
Joe Serna^{[b]}	1981–1992
Daniel Thompson	1977–1981
Callie Carney^{[c]}	1975–1977
Phillip Isenberg^{[b]}	1971–1975

District 5 is located in the southern central area of Sacramento. Neighborhoods in District 5 include

- Airport (Executive)
- Brentwood
- Carleton Tract
- Colonial Heights
- Curtis Park
- Freeport Manor
- Golf Course Terrace
- Hollywood Park
- Lawrence Park
- Mangan Park
- Med Center
- North City Farms
- Oak Park (North Oak Park, Central Oak Park, & South Oak Park)
- SCC
- South City Farms
- Woodbine
- Z'Berg Park

Councilmember Caity Maple represents District 5 of the City of Sacramento.

=== District 6 ===
District 6 Councilmembers
Name	In office
Eric Guerra	2015–present
Kevin McCarty	2004–2014
Dave Jones^{[a]}	1999–2004
Darrell Steinberg^{[b]}^{[c]}	1992–1998
Kim Mueller	1987–1992
Bill Smallman	1983–1987
Eva Garcia^{[c]}	1982–1983
Lloyd Connelly^{[b]}	1975–1982
Ritz Nagrow	1971–1975

District 6 is in Sacramento's southeastern central area. The district includes the neighborhoods of:

- Avondale
- Campus Commons
- College/Glen
- Colonial Village
- Colonial Manor
- Elmhurst
- Fruitridge Manor
- Glen Elder
- Granite Regional Park
- Sierra Oaks
- Southeast Village
- Tahoe Park (Tahoe Park proper, West Tahoe Park, Tahoe Park East, & Tahoe Park South)
- Tallac Village

The district previously included UC Davis Medical Center, however this area was removed through a mid-decade redistricting.

Eric Guerra represents the district on the City Council. An alumnus of California State University, Sacramento, where he earned a Masters in Public Policy and Administration and Bachelors of Science, and later served as Preside of the Alumni Association, Guerra served as a Chief of Staff in the California State Legislature before being elected to the council.

Kevin McCarty represented District 6 of the City of Sacramento until he was elected to the California State Assembly in November 2014. He had been a member of the City Council since 2004 when he was elected to replace Dave Jones who was running for a seat in the California State Assembly. His is an alumnus of California State University, Long Beach and Cal State Sacramento where he earned a Masters in Public Policy and Administration, McCarty served as policy director to then Lieutenant Governor Cruz Bustamante prior to being elected to the council.

=== District 7 ===
District 7 Councilmembers
Name	In office
Rick Jennings	2015–present
Darrell Fong	2010–2014
Robbie Waters	1994–2010
Terry Kastanis	1981–1994
Thomas Hoeber	1977–1981
Michael Sands	1971–1977

Sacramento's District 7 is located in the southwestern area of the city. Its neighborhoods include:

- Greenhaven
- Meadowview (southern portion)
- Pocket
- Valley Hi

Councilmember Rick Jennings represents District 7 of the City of Sacramento. Councilmember Jennings is an alumnus of the University of Maryland and won a Super Bowl with the Oakland Raiders.

His predecessor is Darrell Fong who stepped down to run for California State Assembly. A retired Sacramento Police Department Captain, Fong is an alumnus of California State University, Sacramento.

=== District 8 ===
District 8 Councilmembers
Name	In office
Mai Vang	2020–present
Larry Carr	2014–2020
Bonnie Pannell^{[a]}	1998–2014
Sam Pannell^{[d]}	1992–1998
Lynn Robie	1979–1992
Patrick Donovan^{[c]}	1979
Bob Matsui^{[b]}	1971–1979

District 8 is located in Sacramento's southern area. District 8 neighborhoods include:

- Meadowview (northern portion)
- North Laguna

Councilmember Mai Vang represents District 8 of the City of Sacramento.

Her predecessor is Larry Carr.

== Past Councils & Councilmembers ==
=== Past City Councils (1971 election - present) ===
Year	Mayor	City Councilmember							
Year	Mayor	District 1	District 2	District 3	District 4	District 5	District 6	District 7	District 8
1972	Richard H. Marriott	Manuel Ferrales	Rosenwald Robertson^{[d]}	R. Burnett Miller	Anne Rudin	Phillip Isenberg^{[b]}	Ritz Nagrow	Michael Sands	Robert Matsui^{[b]}
1973	Richard H. Marriott	Manuel Ferrales	Rosenwald Robertson^{[d]}	R. Burnett Miller	Anne Rudin	Phillip Isenberg^{[b]}	Ritz Nagrow	Michael Sands	Robert Matsui^{[b]}
1974	Richard H. Marriott	Manuel Ferrales	Herman Lawson^{[c]}	R. Burnett Miller	Anne Rudin	Phillip Isenberg^{[b]}	Ritz Nagrow	Michael Sands	Robert Matsui^{[b]}
1975	Richard H. Marriott	Manuel Ferrales	Herman Lawson^{[c]}	R. Burnett Miller	Anne Rudin	Phillip Isenberg^{[b]}	Ritz Nagrow	Michael Sands	Robert Matsui^{[b]}
1976	Phillip Isenberg^{[b]}	Manuel Ferrales	Blaine Fisher	R. Burnett Miller	Anne Rudin	Callie Carney^{[c]}	Lloyd Connelly^{[b]}	Michael Sands	Robert Matsui^{[b]}
1977	Phillip Isenberg^{[b]}	Manuel Ferrales	Blaine Fisher	R. Burnett Miller	Anne Rudin	Callie Carney^{[c]}	Lloyd Connelly^{[b]}	Michael Sands	Robert Matsui^{[b]}
1978	Phillip Isenberg^{[b]}	John Roberts	Blaine Fisher	Doug Pope	Anne Rudin	Daniel Thompson	Lloyd Connelly^{[b]}	Thomas Hoeber	Robert Matsui^{[b]}
1979	Phillip Isenberg^{[b]}	John Roberts	Blaine Fisher	Doug Pope	Anne Rudin	Daniel Thompson	Lloyd Connelly^{[b]}	Thomas Hoeber	Patrick Donovan^{[c]}
1980	Phillip Isenberg^{[b]}	John Roberts	Blaine Fisher	Doug Pope	Anne Rudin	Daniel Thompson	Lloyd Connelly^{[b]}	Thomas Hoeber	Lynn Robie
1981	Phillip Isenberg^{[b]}	John Roberts	Blaine Fisher	Doug Pope	Anne Rudin	Daniel Thompson	Lloyd Connelly^{[b]}	Thomas Hoeber	Lynn Robie
1982	Phillip Isenberg^{[b]}	David Shore	Blaine Fisher	Doug Pope	Anne Rudin	Joe Serna^{[b]}	Lloyd Connelly^{[b]}	Terry Kastanis	Lynn Robie
1983	R. Burnett Miller^{[c]}	David Shore	Blaine Fisher	Doug Pope	Anne Rudin	Joe Serna^{[b]}	Eva Garcia^{[c]}	Terry Kastanis	Lynn Robie
1984	Anne Rudin	David Shore	Grantland Johnson^{[b]}	Doug Pope	Tom Chinn	Joe Serna^{[b]}	William Smallman	Terry Kastanis	Lynn Robie
1985	Anne Rudin	David Shore	Grantland Johnson^{[b]}	Doug Pope	Tom Chinn	Joe Serna^{[b]}	William Smallman	Terry Kastanis	Lynn Robie
1986	Anne Rudin	David Shore	Grantland Johnson^{[b]}	Doug Pope	Tom Chinn	Joe Serna^{[b]}	William Smallman	Terry Kastanis	Lynn Robie
1987	Anne Rudin	David Shore	Charles Bradley^{[c]}	Doug Pope	Tom Chinn	Joe Serna^{[b]}	William Smallman	Terry Kastanis	Lynn Robie
1988	Anne Rudin	David Shore	Lyla Ferris	Doug Pope	Tom Chinn	Joe Serna^{[b]}	Kim Mueller	Terry Kastanis	Lynn Robie
1989	Anne Rudin	David Shore	Lyla Ferris	Doug Pope	Tom Chinn	Joe Serna^{[b]}	Kim Mueller	Terry Kastanis	Lynn Robie
1990	Anne Rudin	Heather Fargo^{[b]}	Lyla Ferris	Josh Pane	Tom Chinn	Joe Serna^{[b]}	Kim Mueller	Terry Kastanis	Lynn Robie
1991	Anne Rudin	Heather Fargo^{[b]}	Lyla Ferris	Josh Pane	Tom Chinn	Joe Serna^{[b]}	Kim Mueller	Terry Kastanis	Lynn Robie
1992	Anne Rudin	Heather Fargo^{[b]}	Lyla Ferris	Josh Pane	Tom Chinn	Joe Serna^{[b]}	Kim Mueller	Terry Kastanis	Lynn Robie
1993	Joe Serna^{[d]}	Heather Fargo^{[b]}	Rob Kerth	Josh Pane	Jimmie Yee^{[b]}	Deborah Ortiz^{[a]}^{[b]}	Darrell Steinberg^{[b]}^{[c]}	Terry Kastanis	Sam Pannell^{[d]}
1994	Joe Serna^{[d]}	Heather Fargo^{[b]}	Rob Kerth	Josh Pane	Jimmie Yee^{[b]}	Deborah Ortiz^{[a]}^{[b]}	Darrell Steinberg^{[b]}^{[c]}	Terry Kastanis	Sam Pannell^{[d]}
1995	Joe Serna^{[d]}	Heather Fargo^{[b]}	Rob Kerth	Steve Cohn	Jimmie Yee^{[b]}	Deborah Ortiz^{[a]}^{[b]}	Darrell Steinberg^{[b]}^{[c]}	Robbie Waters	Sam Pannell^{[d]}
1996	Joe Serna^{[d]}	Heather Fargo^{[b]}	Rob Kerth	Steve Cohn	Jimmie Yee^{[b]}	Deborah Ortiz^{[a]}^{[b]}	Darrell Steinberg^{[b]}^{[c]}	Robbie Waters	Sam Pannell^{[d]}
1997	Joe Serna^{[d]}	Heather Fargo^{[b]}	Rob Kerth	Steve Cohn	Jimmie Yee^{[b]}	Lauren Hammond^{[a]}	Darrell Steinberg^{[b]}^{[c]}	Robbie Waters	Sam Pannell^{[d]}
1998	Joe Serna^{[d]}	Heather Fargo^{[b]}	Rob Kerth	Steve Cohn	Jimmie Yee^{[b]}	Lauren Hammond^{[a]}	Darrell Steinberg^{[b]}^{[c]}	Robbie Waters	Sam Pannell^{[d]}
1999	Joe Serna^{[d]}	Heather Fargo^{[b]}	Rob Kerth	Steve Cohn	Jimmie Yee^{[b]}	Lauren Hammond^{[a]}	Dave Jones^{[a]}	Robbie Waters	Bonnie Pannell^{[a]}
2000	Jimmie Yee^{[c]}	Heather Fargo^{[b]}	Rob Kerth	Steve Cohn	Joseph Yee^{[c]}	Lauren Hammond^{[a]}	Dave Jones^{[a]}	Robbie Waters	Bonnie Pannell^{[a]}
2001	Heather Fargo	Ray Tretheway^{[a]}	Sandy Sheedy	Steve Cohn	Jimmie Yee	Lauren Hammond^{[a]}	Dave Jones^{[a]}	Robbie Waters	Bonnie Pannell^{[a]}
2002	Heather Fargo	Ray Tretheway^{[a]}	Sandy Sheedy	Steve Cohn	Jimmie Yee	Lauren Hammond^{[a]}	Dave Jones^{[a]}	Robbie Waters	Bonnie Pannell^{[a]}
2003	Heather Fargo	Ray Tretheway^{[a]}	Sandy Sheedy	Steve Cohn	Jimmie Yee	Lauren Hammond^{[a]}	Dave Jones^{[a]}	Robbie Waters	Bonnie Pannell^{[a]}
2004	Heather Fargo	Ray Tretheway^{[a]}	Sandy Sheedy	Steve Cohn	Jimmie Yee	Lauren Hammond^{[a]}	Dave Jones^{[a]}	Robbie Waters	Bonnie Pannell^{[a]}
2005	Heather Fargo	Ray Tretheway^{[a]}	Sandy Sheedy	Steve Cohn	Rob Fong	Lauren Hammond^{[a]}	Kevin McCarty^{[b]}	Robbie Waters	Bonnie Pannell^{[a]}
2006	Heather Fargo	Ray Tretheway^{[a]}	Sandy Sheedy	Steve Cohn	Rob Fong	Lauren Hammond^{[a]}	Kevin McCarty^{[b]}	Robbie Waters	Bonnie Pannell^{[a]}
2007	Heather Fargo	Ray Tretheway^{[a]}	Sandy Sheedy	Steve Cohn	Rob Fong	Lauren Hammond^{[a]}	Kevin McCarty^{[b]}	Robbie Waters	Bonnie Pannell^{[a]}
2008	Heather Fargo	Ray Tretheway^{[a]}	Sandy Sheedy	Steve Cohn	Rob Fong	Lauren Hammond^{[a]}	Kevin McCarty^{[b]}	Robbie Waters	Bonnie Pannell^{[a]}
2009	Kevin Johnson	Ray Tretheway^{[a]}	Sandy Sheedy	Steve Cohn	Rob Fong	Lauren Hammond^{[a]}	Kevin McCarty^{[b]}	Robbie Waters	Bonnie Pannell^{[a]}
2010	Kevin Johnson	Ray Tretheway^{[a]}	Sandy Sheedy	Steve Cohn	Rob Fong	Lauren Hammond^{[a]}	Kevin McCarty^{[b]}	Robbie Waters	Bonnie Pannell^{[a]}
2011	Kevin Johnson	Angelique Ashby	Sandy Sheedy	Steve Cohn	Rob Fong	Jay Schenirer	Kevin McCarty^{[b]}	Darrell Fong	Bonnie Pannell^{[a]}
2012	Kevin Johnson	Angelique Ashby	Sandy Sheedy	Steve Cohn	Rob Fong	Jay Schenirer	Kevin McCarty^{[b]}	Darrell Fong	Bonnie Pannell^{[a]}
2013	Kevin Johnson	Angelique Ashby	Allen Warren	Steve Cohn	Steve Hansen	Jay Schenirer	Kevin McCarty^{[b]}	Darrell Fong	Bonnie Pannell^{[a]}
2014	Kevin Johnson	Angelique Ashby	Allen Warren	Steve Cohn	Steve Hansen	Jay Schenirer	Kevin McCarty^{[b]}	Darrell Fong	Bonnie Pannell^{[a]}
2015	Kevin Johnson	Angelique Ashby	Allen Warren	Jeff Harris	Steve Hansen	Jay Schenirer	Eric Guerra^{[a]}	Rick Jennings	Larry Carr^{[a]}
2016	Kevin Johnson	Angelique Ashby	Allen Warren	Jeff Harris	Steve Hansen	Jay Schenirer	Eric Guerra^{[a]}	Rick Jennings	Larry Carr^{[a]}
2017	Darrell Steinberg	Angelique Ashby	Allen Warren	Jeff Harris	Steve Hansen	Jay Schenirer	Eric Guerra^{[a]}	Rick Jennings	Larry Carr^{[a]}
2018	Darrell Steinberg	Angelique Ashby	Allen Warren	Jeff Harris	Steve Hansen	Jay Schenirer	Eric Guerra^{[a]}	Rick Jennings	Larry Carr^{[a]}
2019	Darrell Steinberg	Angelique Ashby	Allen Warren	Jeff Harris	Steve Hansen	Jay Schenirer	Eric Guerra^{[a]}	Rick Jennings	Larry Carr^{[a]}
2020	Darrell Steinberg	Angelique Ashby	Shahriar "Sean" Loloee^{[f]}	Jeff Harris	Katie Valenzuela	Jay Schenirer	Eric Guerra^{[a]}	Rick Jennings	Mai Vang
2021	Darrell Steinberg	Angelique Ashby	Shahriar "Sean" Loloee^{[f]}	Jeff Harris	Katie Valenzuela	Jay Schenirer	Eric Guerra^{[a]}	Rick Jennings	Mai Vang
2022	Darrell Steinberg	Lisa Kaplan	Shahriar "Sean" Loloee^{[f]}	Karina Talamantes	Katie Valenzuela	Caity Maple	Eric Guerra^{[a]}	Rick Jennings	Mai Vang
2024	Kevin McCarty	Lisa Kaplan	Shoun Thao^{[c]}	Karina Talamantes	Phil Pluckebaum	Caity Maple	Eric Guerra^{[a]}	Rick Jennings	Mai Vang
2025	Kevin McCarty	Lisa Kaplan	Roger Dickinson	Karina Talamantes	Phil Pluckebaum	Caity Maple	Eric Guerra^{[a]}	Rick Jennings	Mai Vang

=== Notable Councilmembers ===
Past Sacramento City Councilmembers with notable achievements include:

- Former City Commissioner of Education Luella Johnston (1912-1913), the first woman to be elected to the Sacramento City Council and to any municipal office in California.
- The late Congressman Robert Matsui, who served 26 years in the United States House of Representatives.
- Current Mayor of Sacramento and former California State Senate Pro Tem Darrell Steinberg, the first leader of the California State Senate from Sacramento since 1882.
- Former California Assemblymember Phillip Isenberg, Sacramento's Mayor for 6 years before serving 14 years in the California State Assembly.
- Former California Secretary of Health and Human Services Grantland Johnson, who also served as a Regional Director of the U.S. Department of Health and Human Services in the Clinton Administration and as a member of the Sacramento County Board of Supervisors.
- U.S. Federal District Judge Kimberly J. Mueller, the second woman appointed to the Sacramento Division of the United States District Court for the Eastern District of California, and the first woman to serve that district as a federal judge.
- Sacramento County Superior Court Judge Lloyd G. Connelly, who followed his time on the Council with a 10-year term in the California State Assembly.
- Former California Assemblymember and Senator Deborah Ortiz, who was the first woman of color and Latina elected to City Council and also served 10 years in the California State Legislature.
- Former Sacramento Mayor Belle Cooledge, the first woman to serve as Mayor of Sacramento.
- Former Sacramento Mayor Anne Rudin, the first woman to be elected Mayor of Sacramento.
- The late former Sacramento Mayor Joe Serna, the first Latino to be elected Mayor of Sacramento.
- Former Sacramento Mayor Heather Fargo.
- Former California Insurance Commissioner and Former Assemblymember Dave Jones.
- Former Sacramento County Supervisor and Former Mayor Jimmie Yee.

== See also ==
- Mayor of Sacramento, California

== Notes ==
^{a} Elected via a special election to complete the remainder of the previous council member's term.
^{b} Resigned prior to the end of their council term after being elected to another office (e.g. Mayor, State Assembly, County Board of Supervisors, etc.).
^{c} Appointed to complete the remainder of the previous council member's term.
^{d} Died in office.
^{e} Retired.
^{f} Resigned prior to the end of their council term after being indicted on federal charges.
