= Oak Park, Sacramento, California =

Oak Park
- Neighborhood of Sacramento
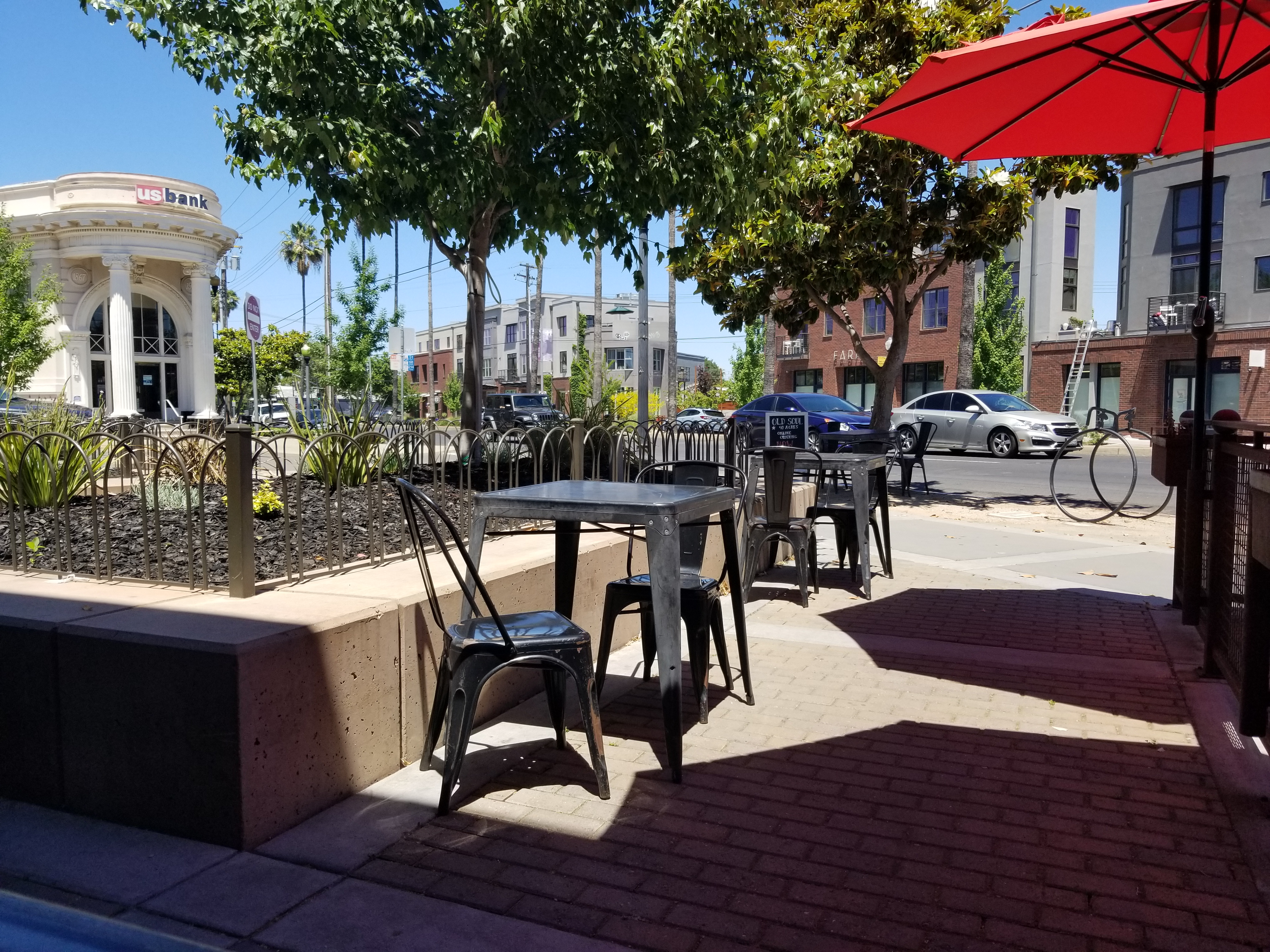
- Broadway Triangle District in Oak Park

- Location within Sacramento
- Coordinates: 38.544045°N 121.463116°W
- Country: United States
- State: California
- County: Sacramento
- City: Sacramento
- Zip Codes: 95817 and 95820

Oak Park is a neighborhood in Sacramento, California. The McGeorge School of Law, University of the Pacific Sacramento Campus, Sacramento High School, and Christian Brothers High School are located in this neighborhood.

Oak Park is informally bounded by U.S. Route 50 to the north, Stockton Boulevard to the east, the South Sacramento (99) Freeway to the west and Fruitridge Road to the south. It is situated within the city limits and provides easy access to Downtown Sacramento. Numbered streets intersect with numbered avenues, with Broadway and Martin Luther King Jr. Boulevard (formerly known as Sacramento Boulevard) comprising the main thoroughfares.

== History ==
The early 1900s saw Oak Park as a culturally-thriving and economically-vibrant destination neighborhood, due in part to its strong sense of community and its ties with and proximity to the historic site of the California State Fairgrounds. Oak Park was originally home to many White Americans of European descent. The neighborhoods were very well-developed and prosperous due to the many businesses in the area. However, Oak Park was never able to fully recover due to the effects of the Great Depression compounded by discriminatory practices. Before World War II, like many cities, Oak Park experienced redlining which segregated neighborhoods by race. e.g. East Oak Park "Negro families are concentrated between 5th & 8th Aves. on San Jose. Their presence has started active resistance to further infiltration of all subversive elements" (1937). Whites in the area began moving to buy houses elsewhere, which also made area property values diminish. The 1960s interstate freeway expansion program physically divided many historic Sacramento neighborhoods like Oak Park, creating isolated areas of poverty or relative prosperity. Oak Park's sense of community started to decline in the early 1960s as a result of the freeway expansion, declining property values, and families moving out to the suburb communities now made easily accessible to them by the freeway expansion. During the 1980s and 1990s, further deterioration of the living standards were exacerbated by frequent occurrences of petty theft, street crime, drug activities, and gang-related violence.

Recently, the early 2000s saw a slew of real estate speculators and building contractors buying up low-priced homes in some parts of Oak Park that were either abandoned or sold off as unmanageable, and turning them around and reselling them as reasonably priced starter homes, often with financial government assistance. At the same time, many new high-paying jobs moved into the area, in connection with the expansion of the University of California Davis Medical Center, located to the north of Oak Park; the revitalization of Broadway and Stockton Boulevard; and the expansion of the McGeorge School of Law campus. Former Mayor of Sacramento Kevin Johnson founded the St. Hope Company, which started helping the charter school system in the area as well, carrying out various projects, including the construction of apartments and improvements to the area's public buildings. There have been recurring annual events that occur in Oak Park like Sacramento Asian Pacific Film Festival, Oak Park Farmers Market, Sacramento Black Book Fair, and Day of the Dead Oak Park.

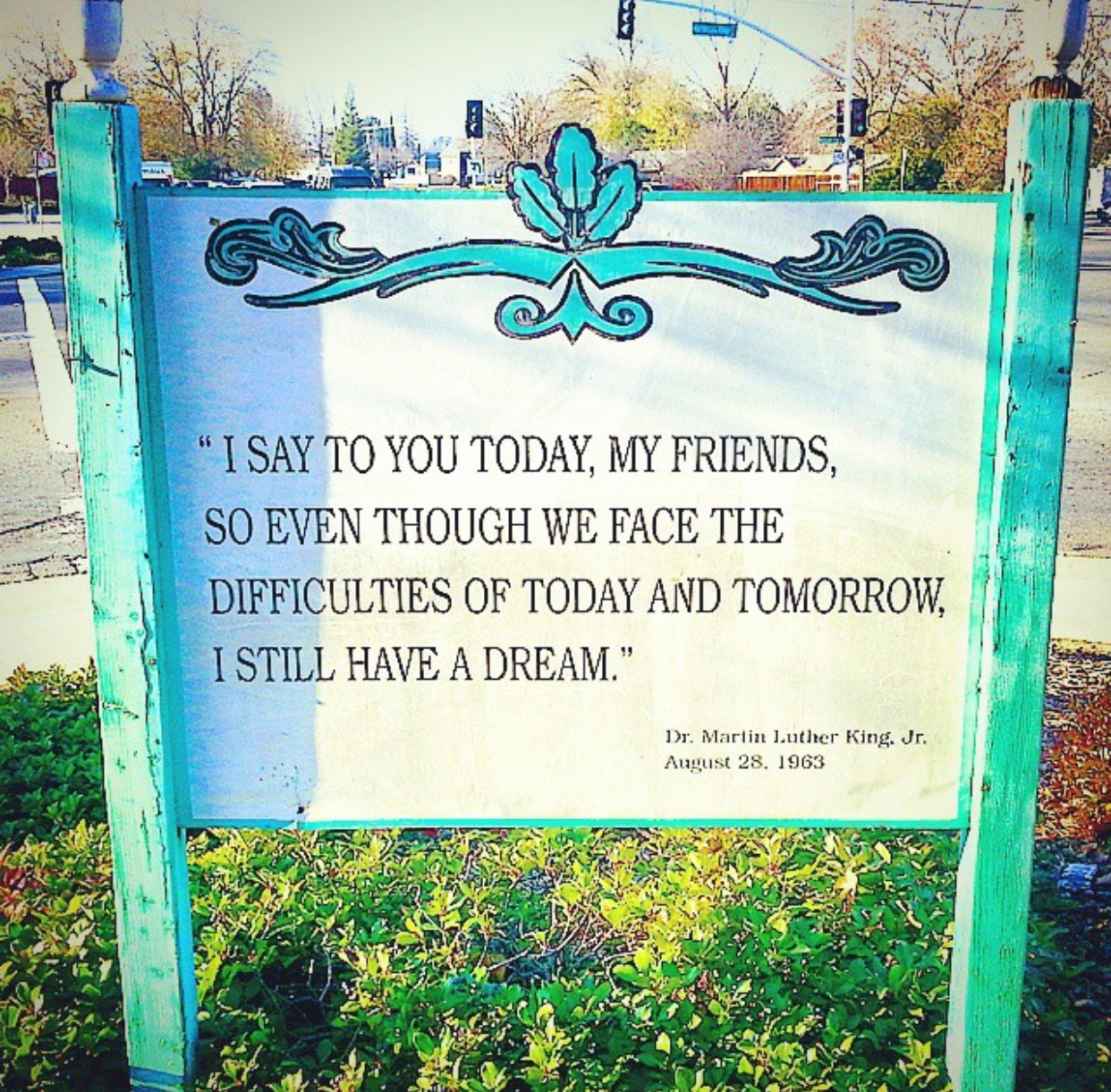
A permanent sign at the southeast corner of Martin Luther King Jr. Blvd. and 14th Ave. displaying a famous quote from Martin Luther King Jr.’s I Have a Dream speech

=== Oak Park's downtown ===
In addition to being Sacramento's first suburb, Oak Park also developed a second "downtown" retail and entertainment district, distinct from Sacramento's downtown, running along 35th Street between Sacramento Boulevard (now Martin Luther King Jr. Boulevard) to the north, and 5th Avenue and McClatchy Park to the South. The street was home to the Piggly Wiggly, Park Meat Market, and Arata Bros markets; Steen's Corner Saloon; Azevedo's Women's Apparel; Janek and Scurfield canvass goods; Citizens Bank of Oak Park; the Ben Franklin variety store; and many others. The street's arts and entertainment could be found at the Victor Theater (Guild Theater), the California Theater, the Belmonte Gallery or the outdoor theater and pavilion at the park. 35th Street area also played host to the annual July 4th parade.

=== Oak Park's streetcars ===
Four of Sacramento's seven downtown streetcar lines terminated in Oak Park. The original line, the Central Street Railway, was founded in 1890 by real estate investor Edwin K. Alsip in hopes of motivating people to move to Oak Park and Highland Park. The horse-drawn streetcars were replaced by cable cars, and shortly after, electric trolley cars. Originating at Second and H streets, it followed J Street to 28th St, then south to Sacramento Boulevard (now called Broadway), where it turned east into the new suburbs of Oak Park. The eastern terminus was a public park, then known as Oak Park (now McClatchy Park), on 35th Street and Fifth Avenue. Sacramento Electric, Gas & Railway Company (later Pacific Gas and Electric Company) would acquire this route and expand to include Route 6, which ran to the Oak Park terminus via Fifth Avenue. Meanwhile, a short Route 5 would run east from the Oak Park terminus and end at the Historic site of the California State Fair grounds on Stockton Boulevard.

The Central California Traction Company also ran an interurban rail line from Downtown Sacramento to Stockton. The line headed through Oak Park along Sacramento Boulevard, then Second Avenue, and finally turned south at Stockton Boulevard, running down the eastern edge of Oak Park towards Stockton.

=== Joyland and McClatchy Park ===
In 1895, Oak Park (McClatchy Park) featured acres of shady oak trees, a zoo, a carousel, and a ballpark. When Sacramento Electric, Gas & Railway Company (now PG&E) acquired the Oak Park terminus in 1903, they added a wooden roller coaster, a roller skating rink, an outdoor theater, and a scenic miniature railway. Joyland was born when the park was renovated to include an amusement park, electric lights, and a swimming pool. In addition to local amusement, Joyland was intended to showcase the abilities of electric power and increase ridership on the new electric streetcars.

Joyland caught on fire in 1920 and never reopened. In 1927, Valentine McClatchy purchased the land and gave it to the city to become a city park. Valentine McClatchy named the park in honor of his father James McClatchy, the founder of The Sacramento Bee.

== Recent past ==
As of 2008, Oak Park faced a variety of challenges sustaining the beginnings of its comeback, due in part to an increase in foreclosures and an area-wide decline in property values. Community groups like the Oak Park Neighborhood Association, the South Oak Park Community Association (SOPCA) established in 2014, community policing efforts, demand for affordable housing close to the University of California Davis Medical Center, and the overall impact that the real estate market will play in the future. Since 2010, Oak Park has experienced significant gentrification. Oak Park, especially the northern part, has been transitioning over the last decade. Some of the changes that have been made are increases in housing values and construction of new restaurants and businesses. The housing prices in Oak Park have tripled and modern buildings and apartments have been built in the neighborhood. The new restaurants that have been built act as community gathering places and local tourism attractions. A few notable small businesses include Strapping Store, Fixins Soul Kitchen, Faria Bakery, The Plant Foundry, Oaxaca Cocteleria & Mezcaleria, Butterscoth Den, Happy Takeout, Flower Fish Market, La Venadita, Old Soul @ 40 Acres, Black Sails Coffee Roasters, Pila Kava, Licked, Underground Books, and Oak Park Brewing Co.

== Political Representation ==
- Sacramento City Council: Caity Maple
- Sacramento County Board of Supervisors: Phil Serna
- California's 6th State Assembly district: Maggy Krell
- California's 8th senatorial district: Angelique Ashby
- California's 7th congressional district: Doris Matsui

== Notable residents ==
- Cornel West, philosopher, theologian and political activist
- Diego Corrales, former boxing champion
- Hobo Johnson, vocalist and frontman of Hobo Johnson & the LoveMakers
- Kevin Johnson, former mayor of Sacramento, and former NBA star
- Chino Moreno, lead vocalist of alternative metal band Deftones
- Mozzy, rapper
- Deborah Ortiz, former California State Legislator, who represented districts which included Oak Park
- Cynthia Robinson, Rock and Roll Hall of Fame inductee, trumpeter, and vocalist in Sly and the Family Stone
