= Elmhurst, California =

Elmhurst, California may refer to:

- Elmhurst, Oakland, California
- Elmhurst, Sacramento, California
