= Southeast Village =

Neighborhood of Sacramento, California, United States

Coordinates: 38°30′30″N 121°25′15″W

Southeast Village is a neighborhood in Southeast Sacramento. Its boundaries are Lemon Hill Ave to the north, 65th St. Expy to the west, 53rd Ave to the south, along with Logan St and 75th St to the east.

== Features ==
Elder Creek Road is the main artery that runs through the middle of the neighborhood. The neighborhood has one elementary school, a park, a cemetery, an apartment complex, a shopping complex, five places of worship, and a creek. It is primarily residential yet very close to the industrial area, and it is bordered by Sacramento County in the south.

Camellia Basic is a magnet school.

Camellia Park is adjacent to the school. It has a lighted tennis court, a small soccer field, a baseball diamond, an adventure play area, and basketball courts for physical activity. It is being expanded.

Elder Creek Cemetery is a small plot dating back to 1864 and is considered a historic cemetery.

Morrison Creek is a creek that splits the neighborhood into the northern section and the Southern Portion.

Kennedy Estates is located on the very western edge of the neighborhood. The apartment complex provides an affordable place to live.

Elder Creek Market is the only shopping complex located within the neighborhood. It provides goods that otherwise people would have to travel further to buy.

== Government ==
- Sacramento City Council: Sacramento City District 6
- Sacramento County Board of Supervisors: Sacramento County District 1
- California State Legislature: 9th Assembly District; 6th Senate District
- United States House of Representatives: California's 6th congressional district, represented by Democrat Ami Bera
