= Luella Johnston =

American businesswoman, civic reformer, suffragette

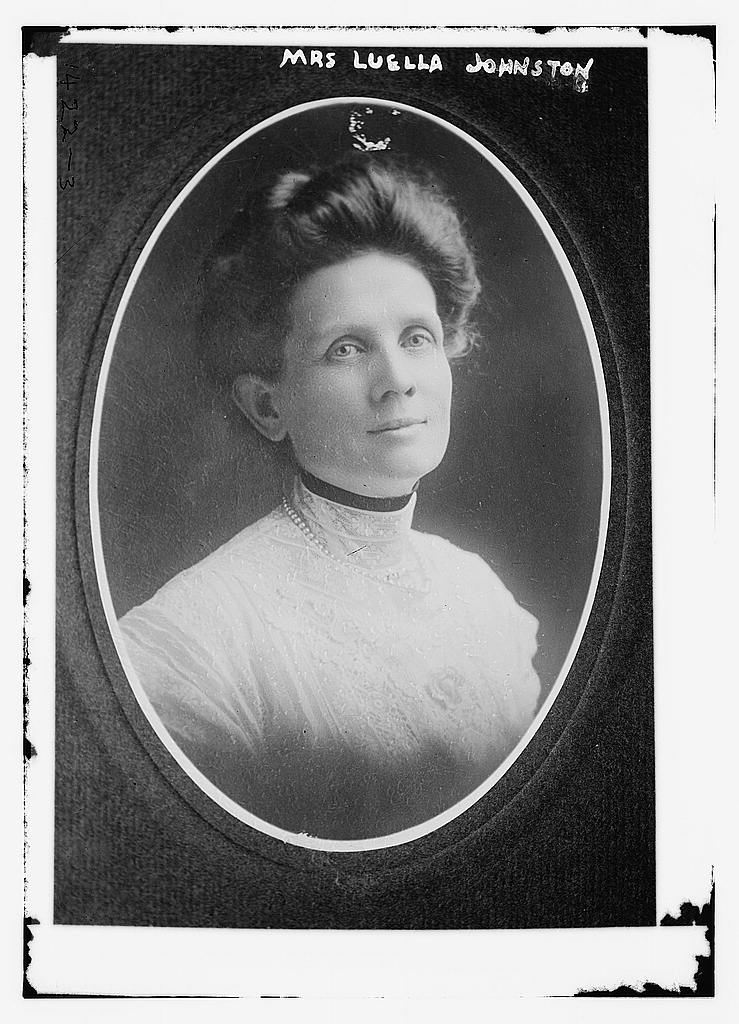
Luella Johnston, circa 1910s

Luella Johnston (née Buckminster, 1861 – March 11, 1958), was an early 20th-century American businesswoman, civic reformer, and suffragist who was also the first woman elected to the Sacramento City Council (then called the City Commission), where she served from 1912 to 1913. Her election was the first time a woman was elected to a city council in California or of any major American city.

== Biography ==
In 1912, one year after women won the right to vote in California, Johnston ran for a position on the new City Commission. She was elected as part of a slate of Progressive candidates, defeating the railroad-aligned incumbents. Her campaign had the backing of the Woman's Council, an association of women's clubs she helped found.

While in office Johnston "focused on education, flood control, street lighting, parks, playgrounds, libraries, cultural facilities, utility rates, and advancement of city morals."

Johnston's one year in office made her powerful enemies in the Southern Pacific Railroad, Pacific Gas & Electric, and local saloon owners. Despite a well-organized campaign, she was defeated for re-election in 1913.

=== Legacy ===
Despite Johnston being one of the first women elected to municipal office in the United States, for more than 100 years after her historic election there were no memorials commemorating her in Sacramento. In 2018, led by Councilwoman Angelique Ashby, the City Council voted to rename the City Council Chambers in Historic City Hall after Johnston.

== Other reading ==
- Nicolas Heidorn, "California’s First Councilwoman – Part I," Sacramentality (2018)
