= Grantland (disambiguation) =

Grantland was a sports and pop-culture blog owned and operated by ESPN.

Grantland may also refer to:

- Grant Land, northernmost point of Canada
- Grantland Rice (1880–1954), American sportswriter
- Grantland Johnson (1948–2014), American politician and public administrator

== See also ==
- Land grant
