= Meadowview, Sacramento, California =

Neighborhood of Sacramento in California, United States

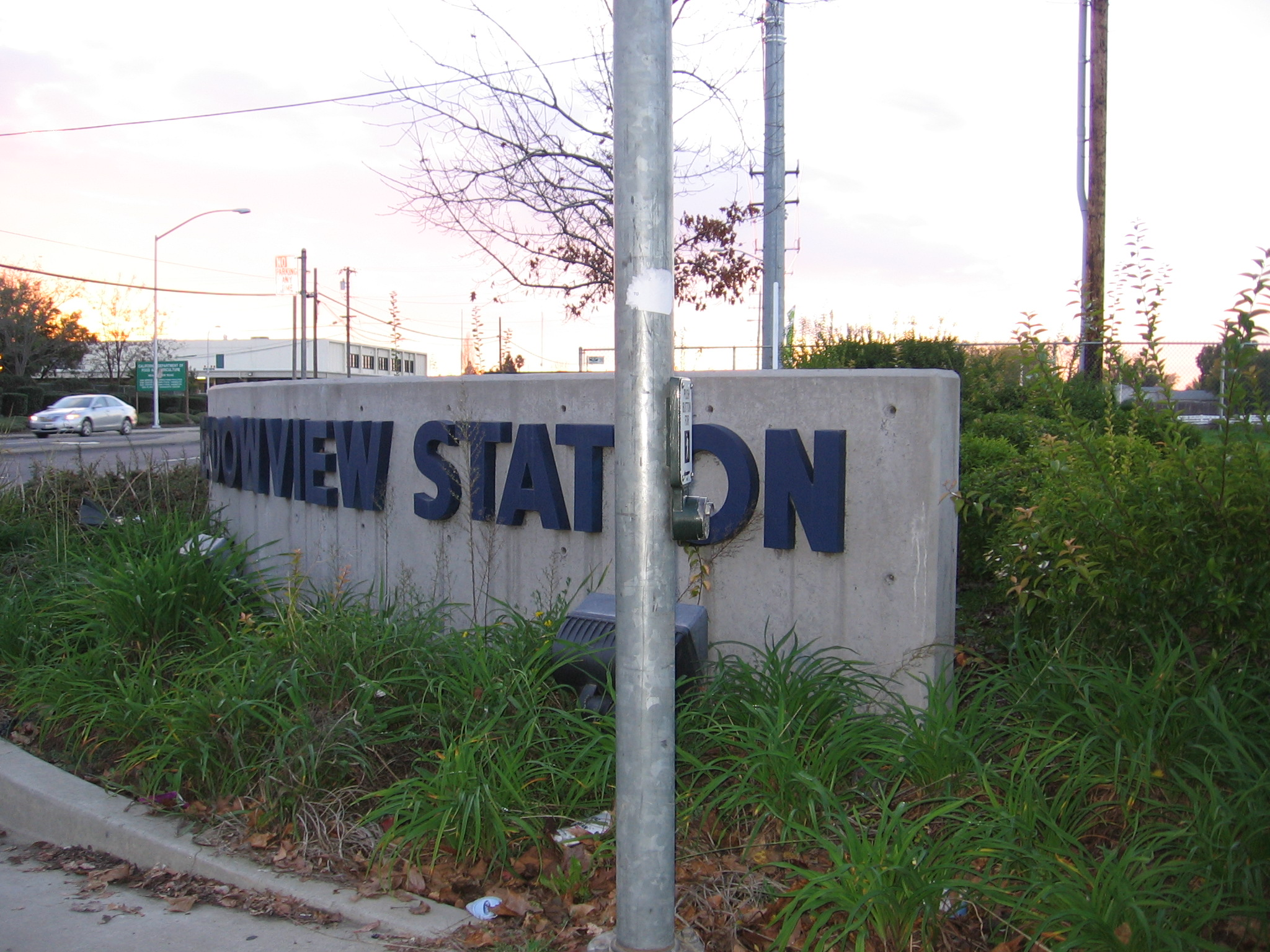
Meadowview Light Rail Station

Meadowview is a neighborhood of Sacramento, California located in the southernmost region of the city. It is adjacent to the Sacramento “City of Trees” Water Tower and home to a reported 5,095 households. The area is approximately 34% Hispanic, 25% African American, 20% Asian, 12% White, 5% Native Hawaiian or Pacific Islander, and 4% of mixed race.

== Overview ==
=== Geography ===
Meadowview is located south of downtown Sacramento, bordered by Florin Road, the Watt/I-80–Downtown–Meadowview Light Rail Line, Delta Shores, and State Route 160. Its proximity to Interstate Highway 5 (I-5) underscores its accessibility and development potential. The landscape of includes a mix of urban development and pockets of green spaces. The area retains traces of its agricultural past, with some remaining open fields and garden plots contributing to the neighborhood's green space.

=== 19th century ===
Before the United States or Mexico gained control, the land in the Meadowview area was occupied by the Maidu, Miwok and Nisenan people, with the communities having deep-rooted connections to the region. The arrival of European settlers and the subsequent Mexican era introduced new dynamics, including the establishment of ranchos, ushering in an era of displacement and genocide by extension for these indigenous communities.

During the early 19th century, the area now known as Meadowview was a part of Mexico, largely characterized by its agrarian economy which was a part of the broader Central Valley. The land management practices were deeply influenced by the Mexican government's policy of granting large tracts of land to influential families, aimed at promoting agricultural development. These "ranchos" were pivotal in the cultivation of the region, primarily through cattle ranching and crop cultivation, crucial to the economy of Alta California during this period.

The landscape of Meadowview and its surroundings underwent significant changes following the Mexican American War, a conflict precipitated by the U.S. annexation of Texas and the broader doctrine of Manifest Destiny. Notably, John Sutter, a prominent figure in early Californian history, held a vast tract of land which included parts of what would become the Meadowview area, influencing development patterns through his agricultural and trade activities.

Post-war, the U.S. government required holders of Spanish and Mexican land grants to validate their claims through a newly established legal process, which led to numerous disputes and often the loss of land for many original, Spanish-speaking landowners.

=== 20th century ===
In the 1960s, Meadowview was a suburb with an estimated 6,500 residents, almost all of them white. As the decade progressed, it attracted a diverse array of middle and working-class Mexican-American and African-American families from various regions including the Bay Area, the Deep South, and the Midwest. This period marked the neighborhood's inception as a residential area, predominantly white in composition but gradually changing in racial composition.

In the early 1970s, Meadowview underwent determinate demographic changes. The introduction of low-income loans altered the neighborhood's socioeconomic fabric, leading to a white flight that dramatically shifted the racial makeup from about 90% white to a majority African American population within a few years. This exodus was fueled by racist fears of declining property values and potential increases in crime. By the late 1970s and 1980s, crime rates, fueled by the war on drugs, over policing and the Garden Blocc Crips, began to rise, impacting families, local businesses and overall community safety. Still, there was a tight-knit community with many families attending the same church congregations or sharing the bond of migration. In the 90s, these issues continued, documented by artists like X-Raided, Brotha Lynch Hung, C-Bo, and Mr. Doctor who, through Black Market Records, released music that channeled street feuds to the masses.

Since then, community initiatives like the Samuel C. Pannell Community Center have played a pivotal role in revitalizing Meadowview. This center, named after a late African American city official, and other new developments have fostered community cohesion by offering various programs aimed at youth and families in addition to offering a gym, computer lab, and other tools.

=== 21st century ===
On March 18, 2018, an unarmed 22-year old by the name of Stephon Alonzo Clark was shot and killed by two Sacramento Police officers in Meadowview, sparking widespread condemnation and protest.

In 2020, during the George Floyd protests, residents of Meadowview invoked the image of Stephon Clark in the call for police reform and abolition.

== Demographics and economy ==
According to the 2021 American Community Survey by the U.S. Census Bureau, Meadowview's population is approximately 34% Hispanic, 25% African American, 20% Asian, 12% White, 5% Native Hawaiian or Pacific Islander, and 4% of mixed race.

The neighborhood is home to around 5,095 households, with a significant percentage (68.66%) being family households. These households tend to have an average of four members each. While most housing units (59.94%) are owner-occupied, a substantial portion (40.06%) consists of renters.

Education in Meadowview varies, with 33.9% of the population holding a high school degree, and 27.91% possessing a college certificate. A smaller percentage, 13.22%, have attained a bachelor's degree.

The community is predominantly engaged in white-collar jobs, which make up 75.28% of employment for residents.

== Culture and recreation ==
=== Parks ===
The area boasts several parks which are hubs of activity, especially on weekends. These green spaces host soccer Sunday leagues that are particularly popular among immigrant adults, providing a recreational outlet and a chance to socialize. Food vendors of raspados, elotes, and magonadas can often be found nearby.

=== Community center and churches ===
The Samuel C. Pannell Community Center serves as a hub for various community activities and events. It provides residents with access to a gym, computer lab, and other facilities, fostering a sense of community and engagement among residents. More recently has hosted neighborhood walks.

Churches in the area also play a vital role in community life, offering spiritual services and community support. They include but are not limited to:

1.New Hope Community Church

2.Progressive Church of God in Christ

3.Meadowview Baptist Church

4.Cathedral-Praise & Worship Center

5.City Church of Sacramento

6.Sacramento Southgate Seventh-day Adventist Church

7.Genesis Church Sacramento

8.South Sacramento Christian Center

9.Antioch Progressive Church

== Education ==
While Meadowview is part of the Sacramento Unified School District (SCUSD), some students opt to attend schools in the Elk Grove Unified School District (EGUSD) due to its relative proximity.

=== Elementary schools ===
The elementary schools serving the Meadowview area include John Bidwell Elementary School, Edward Kemble Elementary School, Cesar E. Chavez Elementary School, and Capitol Collegiate Academy.

=== Middle schools ===
Middle school options in Meadowview feature Rosa Parks Middle School and Tecoy Porter College Prep.

=== High schools ===
High school students in Meadowview typically attend Luther Burbank High School, John F. Kennedy High School, or Valley High School.

== Government and infrastructure ==
Meadowview is represented at various levels of government as follows:

City Council: District 8 of the Sacramento City Council, represented by Councilmember Mai Vang.

State: California's 8th Senate District and the 10th Assembly District, represented by Senator Angelique V. Ashby and Assembly member Stephanie Nguyen.

Federal: California's 7th Congressional District. The area is represented in the U.S. Senate by Senators Laphonza Butler and Alex Padilla, and in the House of Representatives by Congresswoman Doris O. Matsui.

The Sacramento Jobs Corp Center Building, located at 3100 Meadowview Road, is part of the national Job Corps program and provides free educational and vocational training for young people ages 16 to 24. The center offers various programs aimed at equipping students with the skills needed for careers in fields such as construction technology, carpentry, healthcare, and more.

The Meadowview Light Rail Station, located at 3501 Meadowview Road, is a part of the Sacramento Regional Transit District's (SacRT) Blue Line. Since its inauguration on September 26, 2003, the station has provided efficient transit services to thousands of commuters daily. As the second busiest station in the SacRT network, Meadowview Light Rail Station facilitates approximately 5,400 riders daily and offers amenities such as parking and accessible bus connections. Ongoing modernization efforts by SacRT, including platform improvements and the introduction of new trains, aim to boost capacity and efficiency to meet the increasing demands of Sacramento's public transportation users.

== Notable events ==
=== 1992 gang feud ===
In 1992, the Garden Blocc Crips and the Meadowview Bloods became engaged in a violent feud that resulted in a number of gang-related shootings.

=== Stephon Clark murder ===
In the late evening of March 18, 2018, an unarmed Stephon Clark was shot and killed by two Sacramento Police officers in Meadowview, sparking widespread condemnation and protest. As of 2024, the family still seeks justice.

=== Crime trends downward ===
Meadowview's crime perception is often more severe than the reality. Recent analyses show that violent crime rates in Meadowview are not significantly higher than in many other parts of Sacramento. In fact, over recent years, Meadowview has seen a decline in violent crimes due to factors like improved community engagement, increased government enforcement efforts, and economic improvements. These efforts have contributed to creating a safer environment and dispelling long-standing myths about the area's safety.

=== LeVar Burton Park unveiling ===
Formerly known as Richfield Park, LeVar Burton Park was opened to the public on June 11, 2019, named after the esteemed actor and educator who was raised in the neighborhood. LeVar Burton was in attendance.

=== Federal land acquisition ===
Recently, Meadowview has seen a significant development with the acquisition of 102 acres from the federal government. This new land presents numerous possibilities for community development, which are outlined in recent reports. The options may include new housing developments, community spaces, or commercial areas. More recently, a sports complex has been floated.

== Notable residents ==
- LeVar Burton, actor
- Mahisha Dellinger, business owner, beauty mogul and author
- Greg Vaughn, Major League Baseball player
- Cornel West, academic, presidential candidate
- X-Raided, convicted murderer, member of the Garden Blocc Crips, and rapper
- Brotha Lynch Hung, member of the Garden Blocc Crips, rapper
- C-Bo, member of the Garden Blocc Crips, rapper
- Kevin Galloway, professional American basketball player
- Mr. Doctor, rapper
- G-Man, rapper
- Zach Hill, member of Death Grips
- Fidel Barajas, Major League Soccer player
- Jesus Moreno, lead singer of Grupo Diez 4tro
