= Belle Cooledge =

American politician

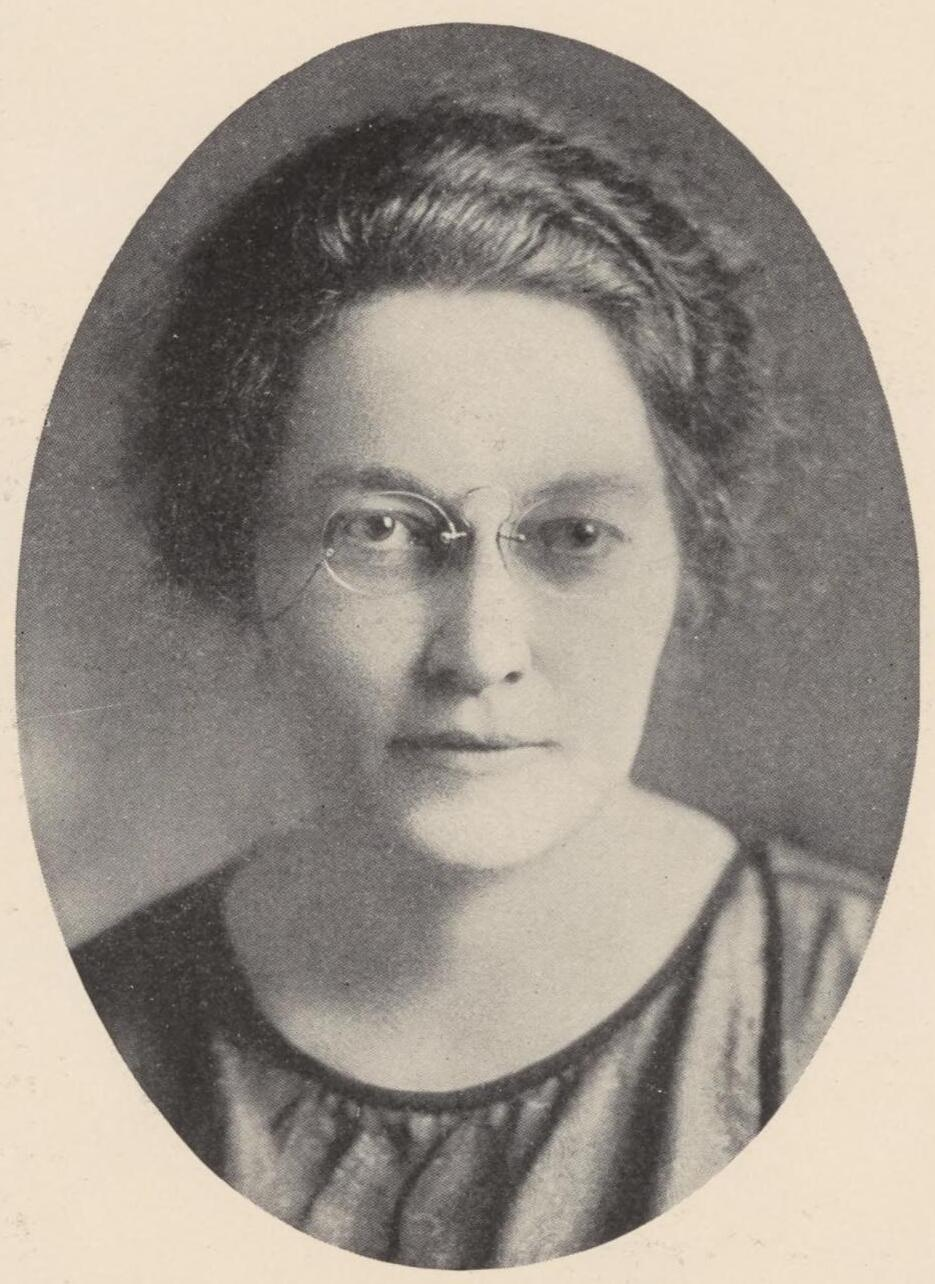
- Belle Cooledge, 1923

40th Mayor of Sacramento
- In office 1948–1949
- Preceded by: George L. Klumpp
- Succeeded by: Bert E. Geisreiter

Personal details
- Born: July 29, 1884 Sutter Creek, California, US
- Died: November 9, 1955 (aged 71) Sacramento, California, US
- Profession: Professor, School Administrator

Belle Cooledge (July 29, 1884 – November 9, 1955), also known as "Auntie Belle," was the first female mayor of Sacramento, California, and one of the founders of Sacramento City College, which was known as Sacramento Junior College when it opened in 1916, and became the first de facto president, though she never assumed the title. She was elected to the Sacramento city council in 1947 and appointed mayor by her colleagues in 1948.

== Biography ==
Cooledge was born in Sutter Creek, California, in 1884 to Walter Scott Cooledge and Belle McFarland. Cooledge and her mother were members of the Daughters of the American Revolution. Cooledge graduated from Sacramento High School in 1900. She attended U.C. Berkeley where she majored in chemistry and earned her master's degree in education. She began teaching in 1904 and started working at Sacramento High School in 1912 as a math teacher.

In 1916, Sacramento Junior College was founded; the college was originally housed in the upper floors of Sacramento High School, at 18th and K streets, with Cooledge as its sole administrator.

The college was closed in 1918 after the U.S. entered World War I in 1917. Cooledge took a sabbatical from the college during the war and trained and then worked as an army nurse where she spent another year in the service tending to the wounded soldiers who returned home before resuming her work with Sacramento Junior College when it reopened in 1920.

Cooledge soon became the mathematics professor, dean, and vice president of the Sacramento Junior College, now known as Sacramento City College.

Cooledge worked for the college for 31 years before retiring in 1947 and was soon elected to the Sacramento city council in 1947 and appointed mayor by her colleagues in 1948. She was the first woman to hold the position and did so for two years. She served an additional two years on the city council and was not reelected during the election of 1951. Cooledge “takes her defeat cheerfully,” proclaimed an article in the Sacramento Bee written by Gene Hill.

She was a member of the P.E.O. Sisterhood.

Cooledge died four years later in November 1955.

In the 1931 edition of The Pioneer, Cooledge wrote of her hopes for all City College students. “My wish for you all is that you may take the spirit of endeavor and desire to succeed which we have watched grow in you, to your future undertakings, and that happiness and success may be your reward.”

A branch of the Sacramento Public Library located in the Land Park neighborhood is named in her honor.

== See also ==
- List of mayors of Sacramento
