= Roberta MacGlashan =

American politician

Roberta MacGlashan is an American politician who was most recently a county supervisor in Sacramento County, California.

MacGlashan is a Republican who was elected in the 4th district of the non-partisan Board in 2004, and was subsequently elected in 2008 and 2012. She previously served on the Citrus Heights City Council from 1997 until 2005, serving as mayor twice and as vice-mayor three times. She lives in Gold River with her husband. She decided not to seek re-election in 2016 and her replacement took office in January 2017.
