= Grantland Johnson =

American politician (1948–2014)

Grantland L. Johnson (September 29, 1948 – August 19, 2014) was a Sacramento-area politician and former Secretary of California's Health and Human Services Agency, the first African-American to hold the position. He was born in the Del Paso Heights neighborhood in northern section of Sacramento, California. He was raised by his grandmother, Irene Wallace and mother Mae Willie Johnson and grew up with his two sisters, Rosemary and Cathy. Grantland attended Grant High School where he participated in extra curricular activities such as football, the violin, the debate team and baseball.

== Political career ==
Grantland Johnson was one of a limited number of United States politicians who had served in offices on the city, county, state, and federal levels. Johnson began his career in politics in 1983, when he was elected to the Sacramento City Council. As a councilmember, he helped to establish Sacramento's Economic Development Department and Neighborhood Services Department.

When Ted Sheedy chose not to seek reelection to the Sacramento County Board of Supervisors in 1986, Johnson ran for the District 1 seat, defeating Roger Dickinson in a runoff election. Johnson was reelected in 1990.

Shortly after Bill Clinton was elected President of the United States in 1992, Johnson began to pursue a position in the President's administration. In 1993, President Clinton announced that Johnson had been appointed to the position of Regional Director of the United States Department of Health and Human Services by Secretary of Health and Human Services Donna Shalala.

After serving more than six years in the Clinton Administration, Johnson was selected by California Governor Gray Davis in 1999 to become the state's Secretary of Health and Human Services, the largest state agency in the United States.

Johnson had announced plans for a political comeback in 2010 as he was running for his old seat on the Sacramento County Board of Supervisors that was being vacated after 4 terms by Roger Dickinson who was running for the State Assembly.

== Education ==
Grantland Johnson graduated from Grant Union High School (Sacramento, California) in 1966. Johnson attended American River College, where he received an Associate of Arts degree. He then went on to attend California State University, Sacramento, where he earned a bachelor's degree in Government in 1974. He has been awarded honorary doctorate degrees from Sacramento State and Golden Gate University.

He was a member of Kappa Alpha Psi fraternity, where he was initiated into the Gamma Alpha chapter in 1969.

== Awards and recognition ==
A soccer field in Hagginwood Park–a park in the Del Paso Heights neighborhood of Sacramento, California–was named for Johnson in 2011.

Political offices
Preceded by Sandra R. Smoley	Secretary, California Health and Human Services Agency; 1999 - 2003	Succeeded by S. Kimberly Belshè
Preceded by unknown	Director, U.S. Department of Health & Human Services, Region IX; 1993 - 1999	Succeeded by Catherine Dodd
Preceded by Ted Sheedy	Supervisor, Sacramento County Board of Supervisors, District 1; 1986 - 1993	Succeeded by Roger Dickinson
Preceded by Blaine Fisher	Councilmember, Sacramento City Council, District 2; 1983 - 1986	Succeeded by Charles Bradley
