= Mahisha Dellinger =

American author and TV host

Mahisha Dellinger (born 1973) is an entrepreneur, author and TV host. She is the chief executive officer and founder of CURLS, a natural hair care brand founded in 2002. She is the author of Against All Odds: From the Projects to the Penthouse. Dellinger hosts Mind Your Business with Mahisha on OWN, which debuted in August 2018.

== Career ==
Dellinger founded Curls in 2002. Since then she has worked with other celebrities such as Tameka Cottle in developing their businesses.

== Personal life ==
Dellinger was born in 1973 in the Meadowview neighborhood of Sacramento, California. She has four children.
