= Elmhurst, Sacramento, California =

Elmhurst
- Neighborhood of Sacramento
- Location within Sacramento
- Coordinates: 38.55679°N 121.45248°W
- Country: United States
- State: California
- County: Sacramento
- City: Sacramento

Elmhurst is a historic residential neighborhood located in the eastern part of Sacramento, California. Elmhurst is known for its large elm, ash, and oak trees that provide shady canopy for the neighborhood.

== Location ==
The boundaries of Elmhurst are defined by U.S. Highway 50 to the north, Stockton Boulevard to the west, 57th Street to the east, and V Street and Second Avenue to the south. The main thoroughfare through Elmhurst is T Street.

Sacramento Regional Transit routes through Elmhurst include Bus 15 and Light Rail, with stops at the 48th Street station and is within short walking distance.

== History ==
Elmhurst was established about 1908, when H. A. McClelland purchased about 250 acres (1.0 km^{2}) southeast of Sacramento to create a residential subdivision. The neighborhood was distinguished by California Boulevard, a street running down the middle of the neighborhood with two parks serving as a median: Sunset Park to the west and Sierra Vista Park to the east.

The neighborhood was added to the city in 1911 when Sacramento annexed the areas south and east of the original city grid. When the city standardized its street names in 1916, California Boulevard became an extension of T Street.

In 1921, Elmhurst School was built for the neighborhood. A year later, the school was expanded and renamed "Coloma School". The school operated for 57 years before closing in 1978. The facility was saved from demolition when the Sacramento City Council decided to purchase it, and in 1981 the facility was dedicated as the Coloma Community Center.

Elmhurst has largely remained the same since its creation. One notable exception is that the northern boundary was moved slightly south in the early 1970s, when U.S. Route 50 was upgraded and rerouted from Folsom Boulevard to its current path. Prior to the upgrade, the neighborhood extended northward to the Southern Pacific Railroad line.

== Attractions & Characteristics ==
The UC Davis Medical Center is adjacent to Elmhurst; much of the medical staff take up residence in the neighborhood.

The Coloma Community Center is located in Elmhurst at 4623 T Street; the community center provides recreation and preschool for local residents. Coloma Community Center is where the City of Sacramento operates its public access television station-Sacramento Public Access.

The Julia Morgan House and Gardens is located three miles (5 km) west of Sac State and was designed by famous architect Julia Morgan. It was donated to the school in 1966 by Sacramento philanthropist and eugenicist Charles Goethe and was placed in the National Register of Historic Places in 1982. The school remodeled the house in 2000 honored by the California Heritage Council. Sac State uses the home hosting lectures, small meetings, conferences, community events, and it is available for public special events such as receptions and weddings. The home's west wing houses the Life Center and provides health and fitness classes for seniors.

== Government ==
Elmhurst is represented by the following government districts:

- Sacramento City Council: Sacramento City Districts 6
- Sacramento County Board of Supervisors: Sacramento County District 1
- California State Legislature: 9th Assembly District; 6th Senate District
- United States House of Representatives: California's 6th congressional district, represented by Democrat Ami Bera.
