= Robert Fong =

American politician

Robert King Fong (born 1960) is a United States Democratic Party politician who is a former member of the Sacramento City Council. He was first elected to that post in 2004 and was reelected in 2008 without opposition. In December 2012, he was replaced by Steve Hansen.

== Education ==
Fong is an alumnus of the University of California, Berkeley where he received his undergraduate degree and the UC Davis School of Lawwhere he received his Juris Doctor.

== Board of education ==
Fong served on the Sacramento City Unified School District Board of Education for 6 years from 1998 until 2004. When he initially ran for the board, Fong was part of a slate of candidates put up by the late mayor Joe Serna who was attempting to have more control over the struggling, urban school district. He was the president of the board from 2000 until he resigned to take his council seat in 2004.

=== Issues Facing the Board ===
During his time on the board, several controversial issues were dealt with including but not limited to charter schools, teacher contracts, and the California Administrative Services Authority (CASA), a pension plan for top administrators that many considered legally questionable.

With regard to charter schools, the primary issue was the closure of Sacramento High School, the city's oldest high school, and letting St. HOPE, an organization run by Kevin Johnson, a former NBA star who later became Sacramento's mayor, take it over. Due to his support of the conversion, Fong had a recall drive looming against him by the Take Back Our Schools Committee.

In regard to CASA, CalPERS, the public employee retirement system in California, found that it was invalid and that the district owed millions to the retirement system. Another audit found it legally questionable and that it possibly left the district owing ten million dollars in liability.

== Other Community Service ==
Fong has served as the president of the Asian American Bar Association of Sacramento. He also served on the Asian Pacific Chamber of Commerce board of directors and was a member of the Central Valley Regional Water Quality Control Board.

== 2004 Election ==
Fong declared his candidacy for the 4th district council seat which covers much of the Land Park area of Sacramento after Jimmie Yee, who had served on the city council since 1992 except for a brief stint in 2000, announced that he was not going to run again. Fong faced minimal opposition, garnering 77% of the vote to his opponent, Joan King's, 23% of the vote. Joan King, a PR consultant, had been one of the people who attempted to pursue the recall bid against Fong for his actions on the school board.

== Arena Tax ==
Fong was a big proponent, along with then mayor Heather Fargo, of Measures Q and R which were on the 2006 ballot that would have levied a sales tax against Sacramento residents in order to build a new arena for the Sacramento Kings at the Railyards in Downtown Sacramento.

== 2008 Election ==
Fong faced no opposition in his bid for reelection in 2008. The race that garnered a significant amount of attention in Sacramento was the mayoral race between Heather Fargo and Kevin Johnson. Fong decided to support Fargo, the incumbent.
