= Land Park, Sacramento, California =

Neighborhood

Coordinates: 38.5502°N 121.4992°W

Land Park is a neighborhood in the city of Sacramento. Land Park consists of mainly single-family dwellings in the area between Interstate 5 to the west, Broadway to the north, Sutterville Road to the south and Freeport Boulevard to the east. William Land Park is its namesake, a major city park south of U.S. Route 50 and east of Interstate 5 in South Sacramento. The neighborhood is located within Sacramento City Council District 4, which has been represented by Phil Pluckebaum since 2024.

== South Land Park ==
South Land Park is a neighborhood in Sacramento located immediately south of Land Park. It is generally bounded by Sutterville Road to the north, Freeport Boulevard to the east, Interstate 5 to the west, and Florin Road to the south. The neighborhood is primarily residential and includes the South Land Park Hills area, which contains many mid-century and later single-family homes. South Land Park is also adjacent to the Greenhaven–Pocket area of southwestern Sacramento.

== South Land Park Hills ==
South Land Park Hills is a subsection of South Land Park located in southern Sacramento. The neighborhood is primarily residential and includes a mix of single-family homes and apartment developments. Parks in the area include Reichmuth Park, Cooledge Park, and Argonaut Park.

South Land Park Hills is known for its concentration of mid-century modern homes, including a number of houses developed by Joseph Eichler during the 1950s. In 2024, the City of Sacramento designated the South Land Park Hills Unit No. 7 Eichler Historic District, recognizing a collection of Eichler-designed homes constructed between 1955 and 1956. The district is centered on South Land Park Drive, Fordham Way, and Oakridge Way and was designated for its architectural significance as a well-preserved example of mid-century modern residential development.

== Little Pocket ==
Little Pocket is a less well known section of the South Land Park community. Contained by Riverside Blvd, it lies between Sutterville and 35th Ave. This small neighborhood borders along the Sacramento River and Interstate 5. "Little Pocket" is host to a small park, Bahnfleth Park—named after esteemed politician Emil A. Bahnfleth. This park is most popularly used for recreational soccer matches by local youth leagues

== Famous Residents of the Land Park area ==
- Phil Angelides - former California State Treasurer and 2006 gubernatorial nominee
- Rex Babin - Political Cartoonist
- Charles Calderon - California State Legislator lives here while the legislature is in session.
- Deftones - Alternative Metal band.
- Morton Downey Jr. - conservative radio commentator lived here when he was doing his TV show in the 80's in Sacramento
- Robert Fong - Sacramento City Councilmember, 4th district
- H. W. Harkness - a Gold Rush era physician and mycologist who owned most of the north-east corner of what is now the Land Park neighborhood
- Anthony Kennedy - U.S. Supreme Court Justice was raised in the neighborhood and lived here until his appointment to the court.
- Sheila Kuehl - Former California State Legislator from Santa Monica lived in Land Park while serving in the legislature.
- Doris Matsui - Congresswoman, succeeded her husband upon his death, worked in the Clinton White House
- Robert Matsui - Congressman 1979–2005, DCCC Chairman, Sacramento City Councilmember
- Stephen Pearcy (activist) - Sacramento attorney
- Anne Rudin - former Sacramento Mayor
- Wayne Thiebaud - Artist, internationally known and critically influential on several generations of artist.
- William Vollmann - Essayist
- Jimmie Yee - Sacramento County Supervisor and former Sacramento Mayor
- Wilson Riles - former California State Superintendent of Public Instruction
