= Kevin McCarty =

American politician (born 1972)

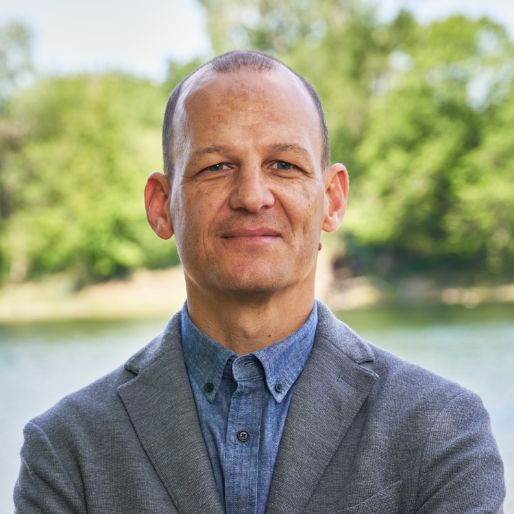
- McCarty in 2024

57th Mayor of Sacramento
- Incumbent
- Assumed office December 10, 2024
- Preceded by: Darrell Steinberg

Member of the California Assembly
- In office December 1, 2014 – November 30, 2024
- Preceded by: Roger Dickinson
- Succeeded by: Maggy Krell
- Constituency: 7th district (2014–2022); 6th district (2022–2024)

Member of the Sacramento City Council from the 6th district
- In office 2004–2014
- Preceded by: Dave Jones
- Succeeded by: Eric Guerra

Personal details
- Born: Kevin Michael McCarty; January 6, 1972 (age 54) Washington, D.C., U.S.
- Party: Democratic
- Children: 2
- Education: California State University, Long Beach (BA); California State University, Sacramento (MPP)

Kevin Michael McCarty (born January 6, 1972) is an American politician who is the 57th and incumbent mayor of Sacramento, serving since 2024. He was elected in 2024, defeating epidemiologist Flojaune Cofer by a margin of 1.4% in the runoff election.

A member of the Democratic Party, McCarty previously served on the Sacramento City Council from 2004 to 2014, where he represented the 6th district. McCarty served in the California State Assembly from 2014 to 2024, representing the 6th District, which encompasses a portion of the Sacramento metropolitan area and most of the city of Sacramento. During his time in the Assembly, McCarty was a member of the California Legislative Black Caucus.

== Early life, education, and early career ==
McCarty was born in Washington D.C., the son of Barbara and Eliot McCarty. His mother is white and his father was African-American. His father was a civil rights attorney and a U.S. Foreign Service Officer in Mexico City and London. After his parents separated while he was a small child, his mother moved with her children to Sacramento.

McCarty attended American River College. He graduated with a bachelor's degree in political science from California State University, Long Beach and a master's degree in public policy and administration from California State University, Sacramento. McCarty worked as Policy Director to former California Lieutenant Governor Cruz Bustamante, and as an Assembly Budget Committee consultant to then-Assemblywoman Denise Moreno Ducheny. He also worked as a Commissioner at the Sacramento Housing and Redevelopment Agency.

== Political career ==
McCarty was first elected to represent District 6 on the Sacramento City Council in 2004. He ran unopposed in 2008 and won re-election in 2012. Representing southeastern Sacramento, McCarty advocated for expanding after-school programs, gun control, and low-emission policies. He voted against a $257 million subsidy to develop the Golden 1 Center and the Downtown Commons, a downtown entertainment and sports complex for the Sacramento Kings. Alongside fellow City Council member Rob Fong, McCarty led the effort to designate a 2-mile section of Stockton Boulevard as Sacramento's "Little Saigon" and received praise from members of the Sacramento Vietnamese community.

=== State Assembly ===
In the 2010 California State Assembly elections, McCarty ran in the Democratic primary for the 9th District, where he came in second place with 34.62% of the vote.

In the 2014 State Assembly elections, McCarty ran for the 7th District while incumbent Roger Dickinson sought election to the California State Senate. He defeated fellow Sacramento City Council member Steve Cohn in the general election. He subsequently won re-election in 2016, 2018, and 2020. As a result of the 2020 United States Census, McCarty was redistricted into the 6th District, where he was re-elected in the 2022 election.

During his time in the State Assembly, McCarty authored over 90 measures that eventually became law, including the Universal Preschool Act, the American River Parkway Conservancy Act, and legislation requiring prosecutors to investigate police officer-involved shootings which resulted in the death of an unarmed civilian. As Chair of the Assembly Budget Subcommittee on Education Finance, he took credit for improving career technical education programs and increased student enrollment at public colleges and universities.

=== Mayor of Sacramento ===
==== 2024 election ====
In 2023, incumbent mayor of Sacramento Darrell Steinberg announced that he wouldn't run for re-election. McCarty subsequently declared his candidacy for the position, with a focus on homelessness, housing affordability, the economy, and safety. In the March 2024 primary, He came in second place with 21.8% of the vote and advanced to the general election against epidemiologist Flojaune Cofer. McCarty won the November general election with 96,433 votes to Cofer's 94,495, a margin of 1,938 votes.

==== Tenure ====
McCarty was officially sworn in on December 10, 2024, succeeding Darrell Steinberg. He is the city's second mayor of African American descent, after Kevin Johnson.

As mayor, McCarty announced a six-point plan to address issues of homelessness. Among his proposals, McCarty announced plans to build safe camping sites for unhoused people in the River District, constructing micro-communities at designed sites in the city, and providing grants to faith-based and non-profit organizations to build tiny homes. After Sacramento City Council member Lisa Kaplan publicly criticized the tiny home program's designation of a site in her district and offered to "stand beside" any lawsuit opposing its construction, McCarty endorsed Kaplan's opponent, Jennifer Chawla, in the June 2026 Sacramento City Council elections. Kaplan won re-election with 52.7% of the vote.

To encourage housing production, McCarty announced "Streamline Sacramento," a program designed to encourage housing construction. The initiative announced 25 improvements to the city's permitting process, including an increase in the business hours of the city's public counter to answer residents questions about permitting, a small business liaison program to support business owners working on building permits or tenant improvements, and the ability for residents and businesses to complete minor permits and inspections online.

McCarty formally campaigned for Major League Baseball to open an expansion team in Sacramento.

== Personal life ==
McCarty currently resides in Sacramento and has two daughters. He is Catholic. He is fond of the American River Parkway, often walking along the corridor and paddle boarding on the American River.

== Electoral history ==
Sacramento City Council, District 6 – March 2, 2004
| Party | Candidate | Votes | % |
|---|---|---|---|
| Democratic | Kevin McCarty | 6,218 | 62.0 |
| Democratic | John Boyd | 3,815 | 38.0 |

Sacramento City Council, District 6 – June 3, 2008
| Party | Candidate | Votes | % |
|---|---|---|---|
| Democratic | Kevin McCarty | 5,654 | 97.31 |
| | write-ins | 156 | 2.69 |

California's 9th State Assembly district: Primary – June 8, 2010
| Party | Candidate | Votes | % |
|---|---|---|---|
| Democratic | Roger Dickinson | 14,157 | 35.12 |
| Democratic | Kevin McCarty | 13,955 | 34.62 |
| Democratic | Lauren Hammond | 7,525 | 18.67 |
| Democratic | Chris Garland | 3,512 | 8.71 |
| Democratic | Adam Sartain | 1,041 | 2.58 |
| | write-ins | 121 | 0.30 |
| Total votes | | 40,311 | 100 |

Sacramento City Council, District 6 – June 5, 2012
| Party | Candidate | Votes | % |
|---|---|---|---|
| Democratic | Kevin McCarty | 6,743 | 73.80 |
| Republican | Mitch Netto | 2,364 | 25.87 |
| | write-ins | 30 | 0.33 |
| | overvotes | 9 | |
| | undervotes | 806 | |
| Total votes | | 9,952 | 100 |

California's 7th State Assembly district – Primary, June 3, 2014
| Party | Candidate | Votes | % |
|---|---|---|---|
| Democratic | Kevin McCarty | 17,788 | 36.52 |
| Democratic | Steve Cohn | 14,876 | 30.54 |
| Republican | Ralph Merletti | 7,245 | 14.88 |
| Republican | Oliver Ponce | 4,377 | 8.99 |
| Democratic | Mark Johannessen | 4,298 | 8.82 |
| | write-ins | 121 | 0.25 |
| | overvotes | 3,585 | |
| | undervotes | 164 | |
| Total votes | | 52,454 | 100 |

California's 7th State Assembly district – November 4, 2014
| Party | Candidate | Votes | % |
|---|---|---|---|
| Democratic | Kevin McCarty | 24,823 | 58.13 |
| Democratic | Steve Cohn | 17,877 | 41.87 |
| | overvotes | 117 | |
| | undervotes | 6,343 | |
| Total votes | | 49,160 | 100 |

California's 7th State Assembly district election, 2016
Primary election
| Party | Candidate | Votes | % |
|---|---|---|---|
| Democratic | Kevin McCarty (incumbent) | 69,901 | 99.5 |
| Republican | Ryan K. Brown (write-in) | 254 | 0.4 |
| Libertarian | Janine Kloss (write-in) | 51 | 0.1 |
| Republican | Ralph Merletti (write-in) | 43 | 0.1 |
| Total votes | | 70,249 | 100.0 |
General election
| Democratic | Kevin McCarty (incumbent) | 111,112 | 69.8 |
| Republican | Ryan K. Brown | 48,097 | 30.2 |
| Total votes | | 159,209 | 100.0 |
| Democratic hold | | | |

California's 7th State Assembly district election, 2018
Primary election
| Party | Candidate | Votes | % |
|---|---|---|---|
| Democratic | Kevin McCarty (incumbent) | 63,705 | 99.6 |
| Republican | Scott Schmidt (write-in) | 237 | 0.4 |
| Total votes | | 63,942 | 100.0 |
General election
| Democratic | Kevin McCarty (incumbent) | 107,849 | 71.3 |
| Republican | Scott Schmidt | 43,361 | 28.7 |
| Total votes | | 151,210 | 100.0 |
| Democratic hold | | | |

2020 California's 7th State Assembly district election
Primary election
| Party | Candidate | Votes | % |
|---|---|---|---|
| Democratic | Kevin McCarty (incumbent) | 43,957 | 100% |
| Total votes | | | |
| Democratic hold | | | |

2022 California's 6th State Assembly district election
Primary election
| Party | Candidate | Votes | % |
|---|---|---|---|
| Democratic | Kevin McCarty (incumbent) | 57,740 | 55.4 |
| Republican | Cathy Cook | 21,522 | 20.6 |
| Democratic | Josh Pane | 15,709 | 15.1 |
| Republican | Bob Marques | 7,340 | 7.0 |
| Libertarian | Janice Marlae Bonser | 1,931 | 1.9 |
| Total votes | | 104,242 | 100% |
General election
| Democratic | Kevin McCarty (incumbent) | 98,656 | 65.6 |
| Republican | Cathy Cook | 51,823 | 34.4 |
| Total votes | | 150,479 | 100% |
| Democratic hold | | | |

2024 Sacramento mayoral election
Primary election
| Candidate | Votes | % |
|---|---|---|
| Flojaune "Flo" Cofer | 30,272 | 29.25 |
| Kevin McCarty | 22,302 | 21.55 |
| Richard Pan | 22,010 | 21.27 |
| Steve Hansen | 21,684 | 20.95 |
| Jose Antonio Avina II | 6,217 | 6.01 |
| Julius M. Engel | 1,013 | 0.98 |
| Total votes | 103,498 | 100 |
General election
| Kevin McCarty | 96,433 | 50.51 |
| Flojaune "Flo" Cofer | 94,495 | 49.49 |
| Total votes | 190,928 | 100 |

Political offices
| Preceded by Darrell Steinberg | Mayor of Sacramento; 2024–present | Incumbent |
