= Roger Dickinson =

American politician (born 1950)

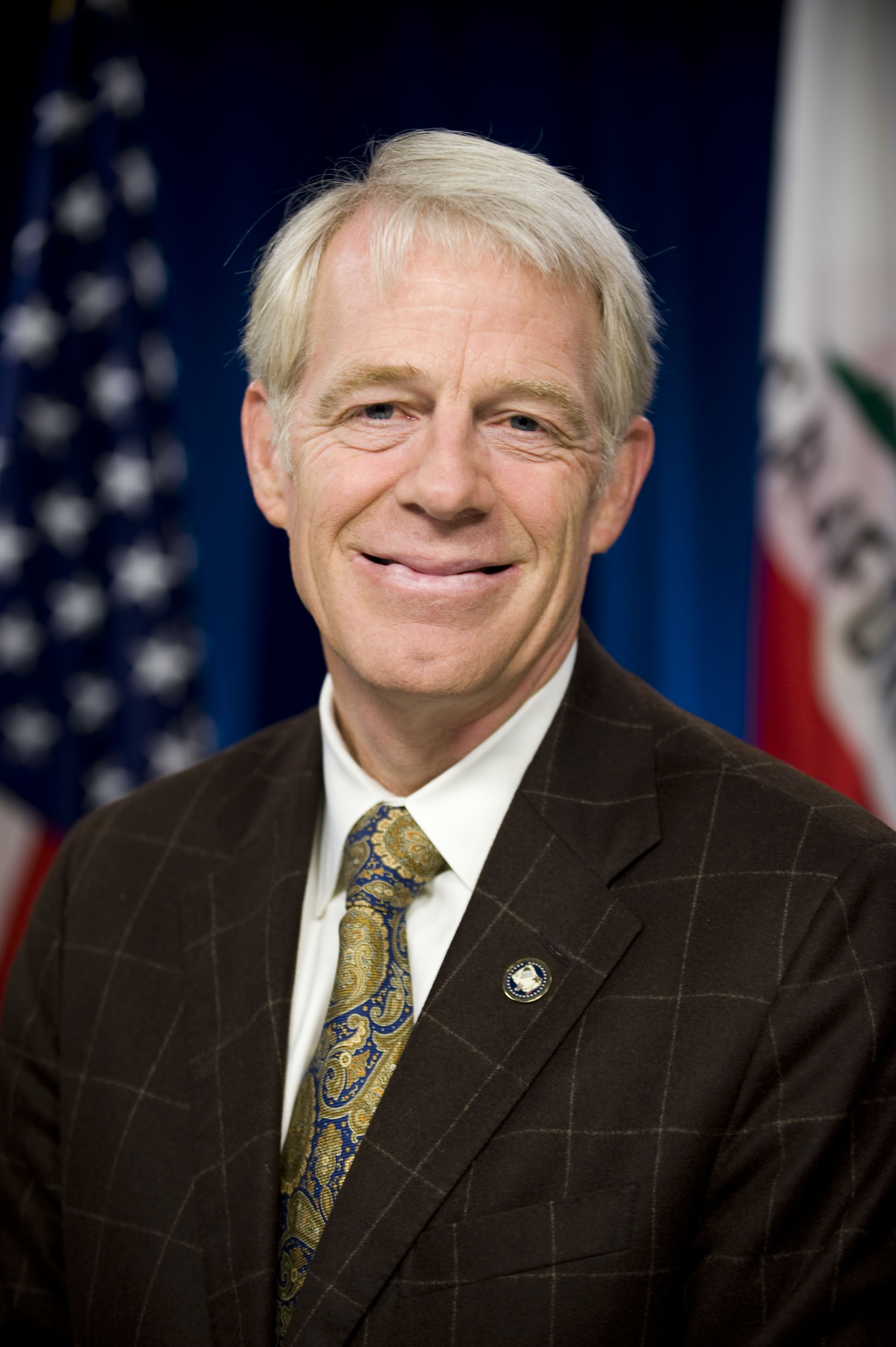

Member of the Sacramento City Council from the 2nd district
- Incumbent
- Assumed office 2024
- Preceded by: Shoun Thao

Member of the California State Assembly
- In office December 6, 2010 – November 30, 2014
- Preceded by: Dave Jones
- Succeeded by: Kevin McCarty
- Constituency: 9th district (2010–2012); 7th district (2012–2014)

Member of the Sacramento County Board of Supervisors from the 1st district
- In office January 1994 – December 6, 2010
- Succeeded by: Phil Serna

Personal details
- Born: Roger Eugene Dickinson; September 22, 1950 (age 75) New Haven, Connecticut, U.S.
- Party: Democratic
- Spouse: Marj Dickinson
- Education: University of California, Berkeley; UCLA School of Law
- Occupation: Politician
- Profession: Consumer attorney

Roger Eugene Dickinson (born September 22, 1950) is an American attorney, current member of the Sacramento City Council representing the 2nd district, and former Democratic member of the California State Assembly, serving the 7th district. Before that he was a Sacramento County supervisor. Dickinson was first elected to the board in a special election in January 1994.

== Personal life ==
Dickinson obtained his undergraduate degree from the UC Berkeley where he lettered in varsity basketball. He received his Juris Doctor degree from UCLA Law School in 1976.
