= Dave Jones (politician) =

American politician (born 1962)

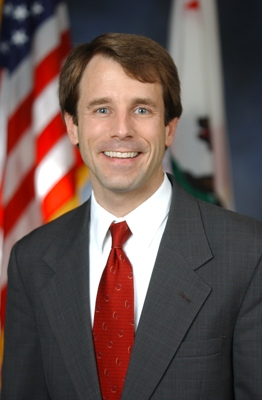

7th Insurance Commissioner of California
- In office January 3, 2011 – January 7, 2019
- Governor: Jerry Brown
- Preceded by: Steve Poizner
- Succeeded by: Ricardo Lara

Member of the California State Assembly from the 9th district
- In office December 6, 2004 – November 30, 2010
- Preceded by: Darrell Steinberg
- Succeeded by: Roger Dickinson

Member of the Sacramento City Council from the 6th district
- In office 1999–2004
- Preceded by: Darrell Steinberg
- Succeeded by: Kevin McCarty

Personal details
- Born: January 4, 1962 (age 64) Philadelphia, Pennsylvania, U.S.
- Party: Democratic
- Spouse: Kim Flores
- Children: 2
- Education: DePauw University (BA); Harvard University (JD, MPP)

David Evan Jones (born January 4, 1962) is an American politician who served as California's Insurance Commissioner from 2011 to 2019. He previously represented California's 9th assembly district from 2004 to 2010 as a member of the Democratic Party.

== Pre-assembly career ==
Jones attended Carl Sandburg High School in Orland Park, Illinois where he served as student body president alongside student body vice-president John Chiang. Lifelong friends, Chiang and Jones would run again together in 2010 on the California Democratic slate, with Chiang winning reelection as State Controller and Jones being elected Insurance Commissioner, and again in 2014, with Chiang being elected State Treasurer and Jones winning reelection as Insurance Commissioner. Both would go down in defeat in the 2018 primary, with Chiang coming in fifth place for Governor of California and Jones coming in third place for Attorney General of California.

=== Sacramento City Council ===
Prior to his election to the State Assembly, Jones was a member of the Sacramento City Council, representing the 6th District, which includes much of Southeastern Sacramento and the College Greens neighborhood in East Sacramento. He served for five and a half years after winning a 1999 special election to replace Darrell Steinberg, also his predecessor in the Assembly.

=== Legal career ===
Before his election to the city council, he worked for six years as a legal aid attorney with Legal Services of Northern California, providing free legal assistance to the poor.

In 1995, Jones was one of 13 Americans awarded a White House Fellowship. Jones served in the Clinton administration for three years. He first served as a special assistant to Janet Reno and later as her counsel.

=== Education ===
Jones received his undergraduate degree from DePauw University, his Juris Doctor degree from Harvard Law School, and a Master of Public Policy degree from Harvard Kennedy School.

== Assembly career ==
=== Committee assignments ===
Jones, a Democrat, chaired the Assembly Judiciary Committee for four years. He also chaired the Assembly Health Committee and the Assembly Budget Subcommittee on Health and Human Services. He served on the Appropriations Committee, the Judiciary Committee, and the Accountability and Government Review Committee.

=== Legislative accomplishments ===
According to Jones' official biography, his legislative accomplishments include:

- Reforming California's conservatorship laws, enacting sweeping protections for seniors and dependent adults facing abuse (Assembly Bill 1363 of 2006).
- Preventing HMOs and health insurers from charging men and women different rates for the same health insurance policies (Assembly Bill 119 of 2009).
- First-in-the-nation legislation allowing Californians to share their personal vehicles in car-sharing pools without invalidating their auto insurance (Assembly Bill 1871 of 2010).
- Securing billions in federal funding to improve California's hospital health care safety net and fund children's health care, by establishing a hospital provider fee (Assembly Bill 1383 of 2009).
- Protecting private medical records from mis-use (Assembly Bill 1298 of 2007) and disclosure (Assembly Bill 211 of 2008).

Jones also authored legislation in 2010 that sought to regulate pet insurance by requiring pet insurance companies to be more specific about which types coverage will be provided. The bill was vetoed by Gov. Arnold Schwarzenegger and did not become law.

== Involvement in other races ==
=== 2008 Sacramento mayor race ===
Jones was mentioned by several people as a potential opponent for Mayor Heather Fargo in 2008 due to his experience in local politics. However, Jones decided not to run and endorsed the mayor in her unsuccessful reelection bid against former NBA star and non profit director Kevin Johnson.

=== 2008 Presidential election ===
Jones supported Democrat Barack Obama in his race against Republican John McCain in the November 2008 Presidential Election. Jones' 2011 inauguration speech indicated his strong support for implementing Obama's health care reform law in California.

== Insurance Commissioner ==
=== 2010 election ===
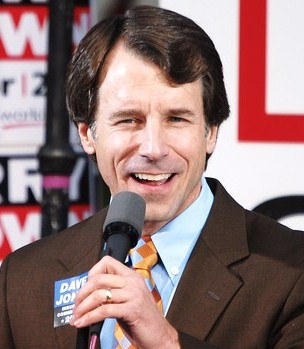
Jones giving a speech

On November 13, 2008, Jones announced his campaign for California State Insurance Commissioner in 2010, a statewide elected office. Republican incumbent Steve Poizner was expected to run for governor. He was quickly endorsed by State Senate President Darrell Steinberg and State Controller John Chiang. Jones' main opponent in the Democratic primary was Los Angeles Assembly Member Hector De La Torre.

Jones won the Democratic Party endorsement by receiving just over 60 percent of the delegate votes at the California Democratic Party's convention in Los Angeles on April 18, 2010. Jones defeated De La Torre in the Democratic Primary.

Jones won 3,544,003 votes in the general election, defeating Republican State Assemblyman Mike Villines, who received 2,650,383 votes.

=== Insurance commissioner career controversies ===
During the development of the health benefit exchange in California, Jones lobbied to exclude providers from the small business portion of the exchange that he felt charged unreasonably high rates. In particular, he worked to exclude Anthem Blue Cross and Blue Cross of California from the exchange. Anthem Blue Cross ended up withdrawing its participation in the small business portion of the exchange, prompting concerns that consumers would not be able to comparison shop on the exchange itself where plan designs were standardized, but would be required to compare exchange plans to externally marketed plans. Jones subsequently claimed that other major carriers on the exchange were charging unreasonable rates including Blue Shield of California and United Healthcare. United Healthcare subsequently withdrew from the California individual market entirely. Blue Shield currently remains a member of the exchange.

=== 2014 election ===
Jones was re-elected to a second term in 2014 with 57 percent of the vote against Republican Ted Gaines, a state senator from Northern California.

=== 2018 Attorney General election ===
In 2018, Jones declared his candidacy for California Attorney General, finishing third in the primary election behind incumbent Democrat Xavier Becerra, who was appointed to the position by then Governor Jerry Brown upon the resignation of Kamala Harris, who was elected to the United States Senate in 2016, and Republican Steven Bailey.

== Personal life ==
Jones and his wife, Kim Flores, live in the Curtis Park neighborhood of Sacramento and have two children, Isabelle and William. In 2017, Jones was a passenger on board Air Canada Flight 759, which narrowly avoided a collision with four other planes while landing at San Francisco International Airport.

== Electoral history ==
Sacramento City Council 6th District Special Election, 1999
Party	Candidate	Votes	%
Nonpartisan	Dave Jones	3,649	76.2
Nonpartisan	Alex-St. James Railey-Cisco	647	13.5
Nonpartisan	Eric Arnoldy	412	8.6
Nonpartisan	Stephen Rodgers	78	1.6

Sacramento City Council 6th District Election, 2000
Party	Candidate	Votes	%
Nonpartisan	Dave Jones (inc.)	7,605	100.0

California State Assembly 9th District Democratic Primary Election, 2004
Party	Candidate	Votes	%
Democratic	Dave Jones	20,429	42.5
Democratic	Roger Dickinson	12,474	25.9
Democratic	Lauren Hammond	8,732	18.1
Democratic	Manny Hernandez	4,348	9.0
Democratic	Leslie Cochren	1,130	2.3
Democratic	Donna Begay	1,064	2.2

California State Assembly 9th District Election, 2004
Party	Candidate	Votes	%
Democratic	Dave Jones	77,880	66.8
Republican	Gaspar Garcia	32,734	28.0
Libertarian	Gale Morgan	6,098	5.2

California State Assembly 9th District Election, 2006
Party	Candidate	Votes	%
Democratic	Dave Jones (inc.)	61,932	70.0
Republican	William Chan	26,652	30.0

California State Assembly 9th District Election, 2008
Party	Candidate	Votes	%
Democratic	Dave Jones (inc.)	92,038	72.9
Republican	Mali Currington	26,622	21.0
Peace and Freedom	Gerald Allen Frink	7,744	6.1

California State Insurance Commissioner Democratic Primary Election, 2010
Party	Candidate	Votes	%
Democratic	Dave Jones	1,255,656	61.4
Democratic	Hector De La Torre	790,493	38.6

California State Insurance Commissioner Election, 2010
Party	Candidate	Votes	%
Democratic	Dave Jones	4,765,400	50.6
Republican	Mike Villines	3,540,626	37.6
Libertarian	Richard Bronstein	372,676	4.0
Peace and Freedom	Dina Josephine Padilla	293,502	3.1
Green	William Balderston	252,301	2.6
American Independent	Clay Pederson	198,347	2.1

California State Insurance Commissioner Primary Election, 2014
Party	Candidate	Votes	%
Democratic	Dave Jones (inc.)	2,106,671	53.1
Republican	Ted Gaines	1,651,242	41.6
Peace and Freedom	Nathalie Hrizi	212,991	5.4

California State Insurance Commissioner Election, 2014
Party	Candidate	Votes	%
Democratic	Dave Jones (inc.)	4,038,165	57.5
Republican	Ted Gaines	2,981,951	42.5

Civic offices
Preceded by Darrell Steinberg	Member of the Sacramento City Council from the 6th district 1999–2004	Succeeded by Kevin McCarty
California Assembly
Preceded by Darrell Steinberg	Member of the California Assembly from the 9th district 2004–2011	Succeeded by Roger Dickinson
Preceded by Ellen Corbett	Chair of the Assembly Judiciary Committee; 2004–2008	Succeeded by Mike Feuer
Political offices
Preceded by Steve Poizner	Insurance Commissioner of California; 2011–2019	Succeeded by Ricardo Lara
