= Angelique Ashby =

American politician (born 1975)

- Official portrait, 2022

Majority Leader of the California Senate
- Incumbent
- Assumed office December 23, 2025
- Preceded by: Lena Gonzalez

Member of the California State Senate from the 8th district
- Incumbent
- Assumed office December 5, 2022
- Preceded by: Richard Pan

Member of the Sacramento City Council from the 1st district
- In office November 23, 2010 – December 5, 2022
- Preceded by: Ray Tretheway
- Succeeded by: Lisa Kaplan; Karina Talamantes

Personal details
- Born: March 20, 1975 (age 51) Ashland, Oregon, U.S.
- Party: Democratic
- Education: University of California, Davis (BA); University of the Pacific (JD)

Angelique V. Ashby (born March 20, 1975) is an American politician and a member of the California State Senate since December 2022. A Democrat, she represents the 8th district. Before joining the legislature, she was elected to the Sacramento City Council in 2010, where she served for 12 years. On December 23, 2025, she was appointed Majority Leader of the California Senate by President pro tem Monique Limón.

== Early life ==
Ashby was born in Ashland, Oregon. Her family moved to the Greater Sacramento region when she was in elementary school. Settling first in the community of Roseville, she attended Sierra Gardens Elementary and Warren T. Eich Junior High. Her family later moved into the City of Sacramento where she attended and graduated from Sacramento High School. Her father was formerly the head of California’s state foster care system.

Ashby became a single mom at 20, before receiving her bachelor's degree from the University of California, Davis and her Juris Doctor degree from the University of the Pacific McGeorge School of Law. She lived in low income housing and utilized various social service programs, such as subsidized childcare and food assistance. She founded a consulting firm with her late father, to create programs to assist parolees, foster children, and incarcerated women.

== Political career ==
Ashby was elected to the Sacramento City Council in 2010, representing the first district. She served as the vice mayor or mayor pro tem seven times during her 12 years on the council. She was the only female councilmember for over six years and the first to give birth while in office. Ashby focused on homelessness, school funding, literacy, economic development, infrastructure and climate change.

=== 2022 state elections ===
In the 2022 state elections, Ashby contested the 8th district in the California State Senate. The race between her and the former Insurance Commissioner Dave Jones was one of the most expensive in state history, with $14.5 million spent on the race according to Cal Matters. Both candidates ran as Democrats. She was endorsed by the previous state senator for the area, Richard Pan, Governor Gavin Newsom, former governor Jerry Brown and the organization EMILY's List.

During the race, Jones sued the California Secretary of State to remove Ashby's ballot designation as a "women's advocate", claiming there is no such profession. She amended her designation to "Sacramento City Councilwoman". Ashby came in second to Jones in the primary election on June 7, 2022. She won the general election on November 8, 2022, Jones conceded on November 29 after seeing Ashby’s election night lead grow with each ballot count update. Ashby became the first woman elected to the State Senate representing the majority of Sacramento County in over 20 years, and only the second woman ever to do so.

== Personal life ==
Ashby married in 2002. Her husband is also from Oregon, obtained his undergraduate degree from the University of Oregon and later earned a Masters Degree as well. He is an emergency room nurse in Sacramento.

They have three children and live in the City of Sacramento.

== Electoral history ==
2022 California State Senate 8th district election
Primary election
Party	Candidate	Votes	%
Democratic	Dave Jones	69,269	46.0
Democratic	Angelique Ashby	61,700	41.0
Democratic	Rafa Garcia	18,947	12.6
Republican	Susan Mason (write-in)	527	0.4
Total votes		150,443	100.0
General election
Democratic	Angelique Ashby	118,135	51.5
Democratic	Dave Jones	111,035	48.5
Total votes		229,170	100.0
Democratic gain from Republican			

California Senate
Preceded by Lena Gonzalez	Majority Leader of the California Senate; 2025–present	Incumbent
