= Sacramento County Board of Supervisors =

Governing body of Sacramento County, California

The Sacramento County Board of Supervisors is the five-member governing board of Sacramento County, California.

Like all other counties in California, with the exception of the City and County of San Francisco, Sacramento is split into five districts and each district elects a supervisor every four years.

== Board of Supervisors ==
=== Current members ===
District	Commissioner	Cities and Communities	Party (officially nonpartisan)
1	Phil Serna	Sacramento, South Sacramento, Natomas	Democratic
2	Patrick Kennedy	Sacramento, South Sacramento, Vineyard	Democratic
3	Rich Desmond	Arden Arcade, Rancho Cordova, Fair Oaks, North Highlands, Foothill Farms	No Party Preference
4	Rosario Rodriguez (Chair)	Citrus Heights, Folsom, Antelope, Orangevale, Rancho Murieta, Elverta, Rio Linda	Republican
5	Patrick Hume (Vice Chair)	Rancho Cordova, Elk Grove, Isleton, Galt	Republican

=== Prior members ===
- Don Nottoli
- Roger Dickinson
- Grantland Johnson
- Roberta MacGlashan
- Susan Peters
- Jimmie R. Yee
- Fred Wade
- Sue Frost

== See also ==
- County Board of Supervisors
