= Killing of Stephon Clark =

2018 fatal shooting by police in Sacramento, California

- Image from Clark's Facebook account
- Date: March 18, 2018
- Time: c. 9:30 p.m. (PT)
- Location: 29th street, Sacramento, California, U.S.; 38°28′56″N 121°28′23″W
- Type: Homicide by shooting, police killing
- Cause: Gunshot wounds
- Participants: Terrence Mercadal and Jared Robinet (shooters)
- Deaths: Stephon Clark, aged 22
- Inquiries: Use of force investigation
- Coroner: A forensic pathologist hired by Clark's family said Clark was shot eight times, including six times in the back. The Sacramento County Coroner's report said he was shot seven times, three times in the back; the Sacramento County Coroner's report was later reviewed by four forensic pathologists.
- Charges: None

On March 18, 2018, Stephon Clark, a 22-year-old African-American man, was shot and killed by Sacramento Police Department officers Terrence Mercadal and Jared Robinet in Meadowview, a neighborhood of Sacramento, California. The encounter took place in the backyard of Clark's grandmother's house and was filmed by two police body cameras and a Sacramento County Sheriff's Department helicopter, which observed Clark from above and directed the officers to his location. The officers stated that they fired 20 rounds at Clark, believing that he had pointed a gun at them. Police found only a cell phone at the scene. While the Sacramento County coroner's autopsy report concluded that Clark was shot seven times, including three shots to the right side of the back, the forensic pathologist hired by the Clark family stated that Clark was shot eight times, including six times in the back.

The Sacramento Police Department placed the officers on paid administrative leave and opened a use of force investigation. Police stated they were confident that Clark was the suspect responsible for breaking windows in the area prior to the encounter. Clark's family rejected the initial police description of the events leading to Clark's death and filed a wrongful-death lawsuit against the City of Sacramento. Sacramento settled part of the lawsuit in 2019, paying $2.4 million to his sons, and finalized the settlement in 2022, paying $1.4 million to his parents. Clark's killing sparked several large protests in Sacramento.

On March 2, 2019, the Sacramento County district attorney announced that the police officers who killed Clark would not be charged, that they had probable cause to stop Clark, and that they were legally justified in the use of deadly force.

== Stephon Clark ==
Stephon Clark (born Stephan Alonzo-Clark, August 10, 1995 – March 18, 2018), was an African-American man who graduated from Sacramento High School in 2013, where he was on the football team. He was 22 years old at the time he was killed. According to The Los Angeles Times, Clark lived in a "tough neighborhood" characterized by tense relations with the Sacramento Police Department. His older brother, Stevante Clark, told KOVR that he and Stephon had come from "underprivileged, broken homes". Their 16-year-old brother was killed in a shooting in 2006. Stephon had been released from county jail about a month before the shooting and was staying with his grandparents on and off. His brother said: "He was arrested before, but he's been different lately. He really changed his life." Sacramento County court records show that Clark had a history of convictions for robbery, domestic abuse, and a prostitution-related offense. At the time of his death, he was on probation for a 2014 robbery conviction. A year later, Clark was arrested for prostituting a woman in his car. He violated probation in December 2015 for that case. According to the investigation, Clark had searched online for ways to commit suicide. A toxicology report also released by police found traces of cocaine, cannabis, and codeine in Clark's system. Codeine and hydrocodone were found in Clark's urine. Multiple leaders in the community opined that Clark's criminal record was immaterial to his death.

On March 16, two days prior to the shooting, police responded to a domestic disturbance call at the residence of Clark and Salena Mohamed Manni, who was mother to Clark's child. Clark was not present when they arrived. Manni told police that Clark had attacked her and that she had escaped and told a neighbor to call the police. The police report noted that Manni had facial injuries and a hole in the wall. Over the next 48 hours, Clark hid from police and called Manni 76 times, according to phone records.

== Shooting ==
The Sacramento Police Department stated that on Sunday, March 18 at 9:18 p.m., two officers responded to a 9-1-1 call reporting an individual who was breaking car windows. In a media release after the shooting, police stated that they had been looking for a suspect hiding in a backyard. They said the suspect was a thin black man, 6 feet 1 inch (185 cm) in height, and wearing dark pants and a black hooded sweatshirt. A sheriff's helicopter spotted a man at 9:25 p.m. in a nearby backyard and told officers on the ground that he had shattered a window using a tool bar, ran to the front of that house, and then looked in an adjacent car.

Officers on the ground entered the front yard of Clark's grandmother's home and saw Clark next to the home. Vance Chandler, the Sacramento Police Department spokesman, said that Clark was the same man who had been breaking windows and was tracked by police in helicopters. Chandler said that when Clark was confronted and ordered to stop and show his hands, Clark fled to the back of the property.

Police body cameras worn by both of the officers who shot Clark recorded the incident, though the footage is dark and shaky. In the footage, the officers spotted Clark in his grandmother's driveway and shouted "Hey, show me your hands. Stop. Stop." The officers chased Clark into the backyard, and an officer yelled: "Show me your hands! Gun!" After about three seconds, the officer yelled, "Show me your hands! Gun, gun, gun", before shooting Clark.

According to the police, before being shot, Clark turned and held an object that he "extended in front of him" while he moved towards the officers. The officers said they believed that Clark was pointing a gun at them. The police stated that the officers feared for their safety, and that at 9:26 p.m. they fired 20 rounds, hitting Clark multiple times. According to an independent autopsy, Clark was shot eight times, including six times in the back. The report found that one of the bullets that struck Clark from the front was likely fired while he was already on the ground.

Body-cam footage depicted that after shooting him, the officers continued to yell at him as one shined a flashlight at him, and they kept their guns aimed at him. One officer stated, "He had something in hands, looked like a gun from our perspective." Three minutes after the shooting, a female officer called to him and said: "We need to know if you're OK. We need to get you medics, so we can't go over and get you help until we know you don't have a weapon." They waited five minutes after shooting Clark before approaching and then handcuffing him. Clark was found to have an iPhone and was unarmed. Clark's girlfriend later said the phone belonged to her. After more officers arrived, one officer said "Hey, mute", and audio recording from the body camera was turned off.

On March 19, one day after the shooting, the police department stated that Clark had been seen with a "tool bar". On the evening of that day, police revised their statement to say that Clark was carrying a cell phone, and not a tool bar, when he was shot. Police added that Clark might have used either a concrete block or an aluminum gutter railing to break a sliding glass door at the house next door to where he was shot, and that they believed Clark had broken windows from at least three vehicles in the area.

== Investigation ==
The Sacramento Police Department began a use of force investigation and placed both officers on paid administrative leave. On March 27, California attorney general Xavier Becerra said that his department would provide independent oversight into the investigation and would separately scrutinize the police department's use of force policies and training procedures.

Prior to the release of the county coroner's report, the family requested a second, independent autopsy, the results of which were released on March 30, 2018. The forensic pathologist, Bennet Omalu, said Clark had been shot eight times from the back or side, adding, "You could reasonably conclude that he received seven gunshot wounds from his back." The Sacramento County coroner's report was subsequently released to the public on May 1, 2018. The report said Omalu's autopsy was "erroneous". The county autopsy, conducted by forensic pathologist Keng-Chih Su, indicated that Clark had been shot once in the front of the left thigh, three times directly to the side, and three times in the right side of the back. The Coroner's office had Su's autopsy reviewed by three pathologists from the county. Their findings were independently reviewed by forensic pathologist Gregory Reiber from Placer County. Reiber said Omalu had made "a significant error" by interpreting an exit wound as an entrance wound, which lead to "incorrect conclusions regarding the relative positions of the victim and shooters during the event". The review corroborated the officers' story that police shot Clark when he was approaching them. Omalu said he was standing "firmly in defense" of his findings.

On June 7, 2018, a New York Times team published an analysis also based on videos made by the two police body cameras and by an overhead, heat-sensing helicopter camera.

During the investigation, it was discovered through Clark's phone records that he had called Salena Mohamed Manni 76 times leading up to the shooting, causing her to block his phone number. Clark also attempted to get a hold of his probation officer in the 48 hours after he was reported for domestic violence, but was unable to do so. Clark had also received text messages from Manni telling him that he would be sent back to prison for the domestic incident and that he would not see his children for a long time. Clark also texted other ex-girlfriends seeking drugs, as well as texting Manni that he was going to commit suicide. An examination of his internet search history also showed that he had been researching websites about suicide.

On March 2, 2019, Sacramento County district attorney Anne Marie Schubert announced that her office would not be filing criminal charges against the police officers involved in Clark's death. Schubert stated that the officers had probable cause to stop and detain Clark and that they were legally justified in using deadly force against him. On March 5, 2019, California attorney general Xavier Becerra announced that his office could not file criminal charges for Clark's death.

On September 26, 2019, US attorney McGregor Scott and the Federal Bureau of Investigation (FBI) announced there was "insufficient evidence" to bring federal civil right charges against the officers. The Sacramento Police Department also said the department's investigation found no policy or training violations related to the shooting. The officers were cleared to return to active duty after they had been assigned to desk duty.

== Officers ==
The Sacramento Police Department initially stated that they would release the names of the officers who shot Clark within 10 days of the event. Sources leaked what they alleged were the names of the shooters; however, the Sacramento Police Department did not confirm the validity of the names citing fears for the officers' safety.

In March 2019, shortly after the district attorney decided to not press charges against them, the two officers revealed their identities as Terrance Mercadal and Jared Robinet, opening up about their experience during the shooting in an interview with The Sacramento Bee.

== Protests ==
Numerous public protests were held in Sacramento after the killing. On March 22, 2018, Black Lives Matter led a march that shut down Interstate 5 and prevented NBA fans from entering a Sacramento Kings game, resulting in its delay. One week after the shooting, the Sacramento Kings and Boston Celtics NBA teams wore shirts with Clark's name and the words "Accountability" and "We are One" during warm-ups and the national anthem. On March 31, after an autopsy by Omalu had concluded that Clark was shot eight times, mostly in the back, hundreds of protesters gathered in downtown Sacramento. The peaceful protest was led by retired NBA player Matt Barnes, who announced that he was starting a scholarship fund for Clark's sons. Black Lives Matter also organized weekly protests in front of the Sacramento County district attorney's office. A chain-link fence was erected around the office in March 2018 after protestors blocked the front doors; the fence was still in place as of March 2019, when protests had occurred there for 49 weeks in a row.

Local activist Wanda Cleveland was struck by a Sacramento County Sheriff's Department vehicle at a rally in April. Video of the incident shows that a number of protesters converged on official vehicles and were ordered over loudspeakers to step away. One sheriff's vehicle hit Cleveland and knocked her down while she was standing in front of the car. According to Cleveland the vehicle was accelerating and "never even stopped" when it hit her. She was hospitalized with bruises on her head and arm and released the next morning. Members of the progressive advocacy group National Lawyers Guild who were present during the protest said the vehicle "accelerated very fast" as it hit Cleveland and then "sped off". According to the sheriff's department, "A collision occurred while the patrol vehicle was traveling at slow speeds." The California Highway Patrol investigated the matter.

At a press conference, Sacramento county sheriff Scott Jones blamed "paid professional protesters" and "professional instigators that infiltrate the protests for their own purposes" for the incident. Protest organizers denied the allegation and were outraged by his comments. Sociology and political science professor David Meyer said Jones's allegation was not realistic. PolitiFact concluded that Jones did not provide evidence to his claim, and rated his claim as false.

In March 2019, the district attorney decided not to pursue charges for Clark's death, which led to protests. 84 people, including journalists, were arrested. About 100 protesters marched through east Sacramento. One protester said they went through the area populated by Sacramento's elite because it was "a neighborhood that would likely never experience such a tragic and violent loss of one of its residents, so we are bringing the discomfort and pain of our trauma to their doorstep".

== Responses ==
=== Elected officials and political activists ===
Sacramento mayor Darrell Steinberg, initially said he would not second-guess decisions made by officers on the ground. Following public backlash, Steinberg stated the videos of Clark's shooting made him feel "really sick" and that the shooting was "wrong," however declined to comment whether the officers should be charged. House minority leader Nancy Pelosi stated that Clark "should be alive today". Reverend Al Sharpton stated that he was alarmed by the story, which he said had not received enough media attention.

On March 26, White House spokesman Raj Shah stated that he was unaware of any comments from President Donald Trump regarding the incident. Two days later, White House press secretary Sarah Huckabee Sanders stated that Trump is "very supportive of law enforcement" and that the incident was a "local matter" that should be dealt with by the local authorities.

=== Clark family ===
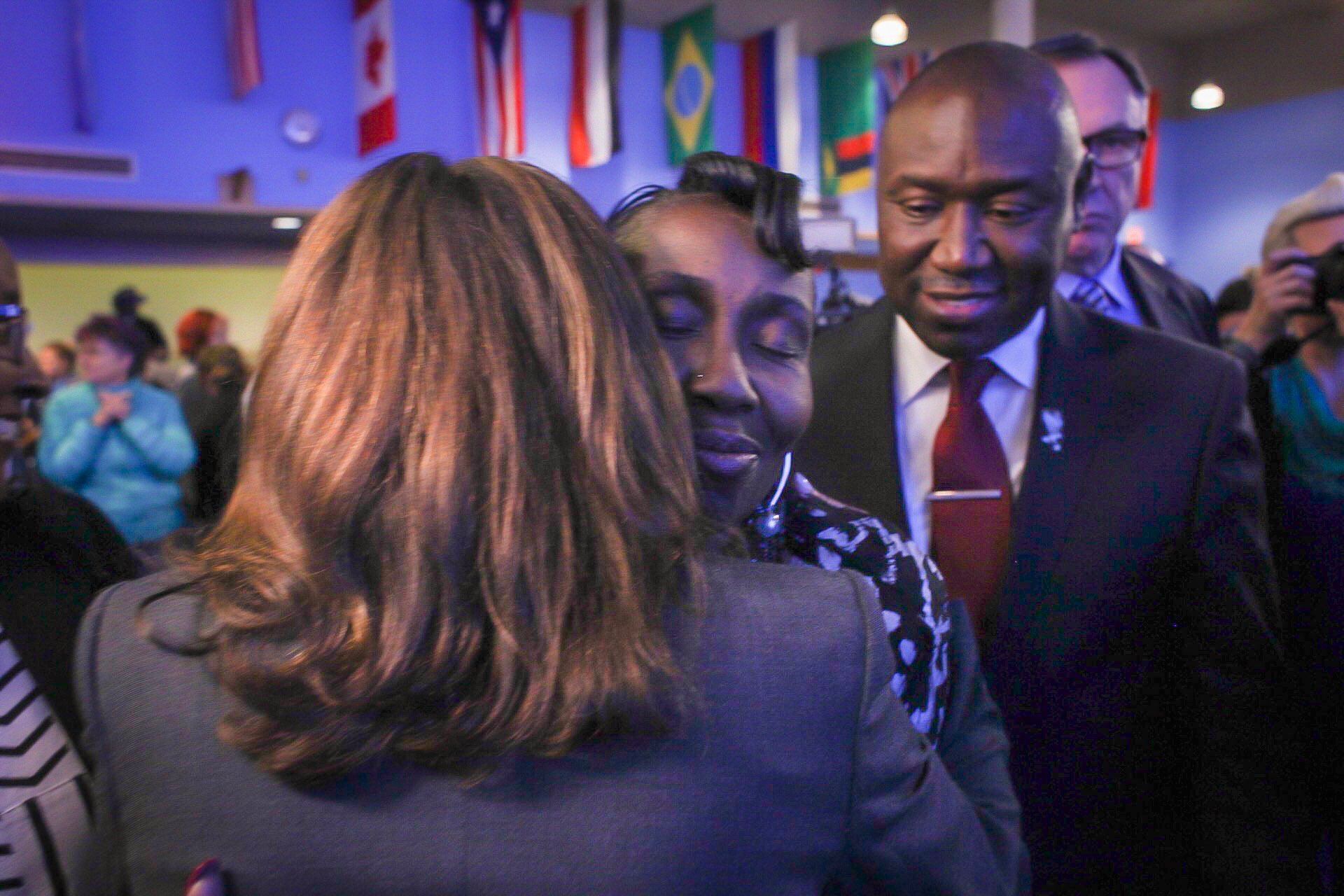
Clark's mother, Se'Quette Clark, receives a hug from US Senator Kamala Harris with attorney Benjamin Crump looking on in 2018.

Civil rights attorney Benjamin Crump, who represented the Clark family, stated that the autopsy finding was inconsistent with the official narrative that Clark was charging toward the police officers when they fired. Clark's family expressed skepticism of the police version of events. Clark's brother, Stevante Clark, said of police statements: "They said he had a gun. Then they said he had a crowbar. Then they said he had a toolbar ... If you lie to me once, I know you'll lie to me again." Clark's aunt Saquoia Durham said that police gave Clark no time to respond to their commands before shooting him. According to Crump, the officers did not identify themselves as police when they encountered Clark. The police stated that the officers who confronted Clark were wearing their uniforms at that time.

In January 2019, Clark's family filed a wrongful-death lawsuit against the City of Sacramento and the two officers who shot Clark, seeking $20 million in damages. In September 2019, the city settled part of the lawsuit by paying $2.4 million to his underage sons; each son would receive $900,000 tax-free when they turned 22. In August 2022, the city finalized the settlement, paying Clark's parents $1.7 million.

=== Policing experts ===
University of South Carolina criminology professor Geoffrey Alpert stated that it might be hard for officers to justify their conclusion that Clark was armed, since they had been told he was carrying a toolbar. Peter Moskos, assistant professor of law and police science at John Jay College, said that the officers appeared to think they had been fired upon following the shooting. Alpert, Clark's family, and protesters questioned officers' decisions to mute their microphones. Police chief Daniel Hahn said he was unable to explain the muting. Cedric Alexander, former police chief in Rochester, New York, and former president of the National Organization of Black Law Enforcement Executives, said that the muting did not appear to violate any policy, although the action would reflect poorly on the officers. He also stated that it is not unusual for police to mute their body cams and that attorneys advise the police to mute conversations to prevent recording any comments that could be used in administrative or criminal proceedings.

=== Policy changes ===
In response to the shooting, in April 2018, the city of Sacramento enacted an emergency order that prohibits police officers from shutting down their body cams and audio recording devices except for defined circumstances. In July 2018, the Sacramento Police Department changed its foot pursuit policy, requiring officers to assess the danger chasing a suspect poses to officers and to the public. Before Clark's shooting, the police were authorized to use deadly force if it was considered "reasonable".

In August 2019, California governor Gavin Newsom signed a law that required the police to use deadly force only "when necessary in defense of human life".

== See also ==
- List of unarmed African Americans killed by law enforcement officers in the United States
- Lists of killings by law enforcement officers in the United States
- Police use of deadly force in the United States
- Killing of Joseph Mann
