= 2016 Sacramento riot =

2016 civil disorder in Sacramento, California, U.S.

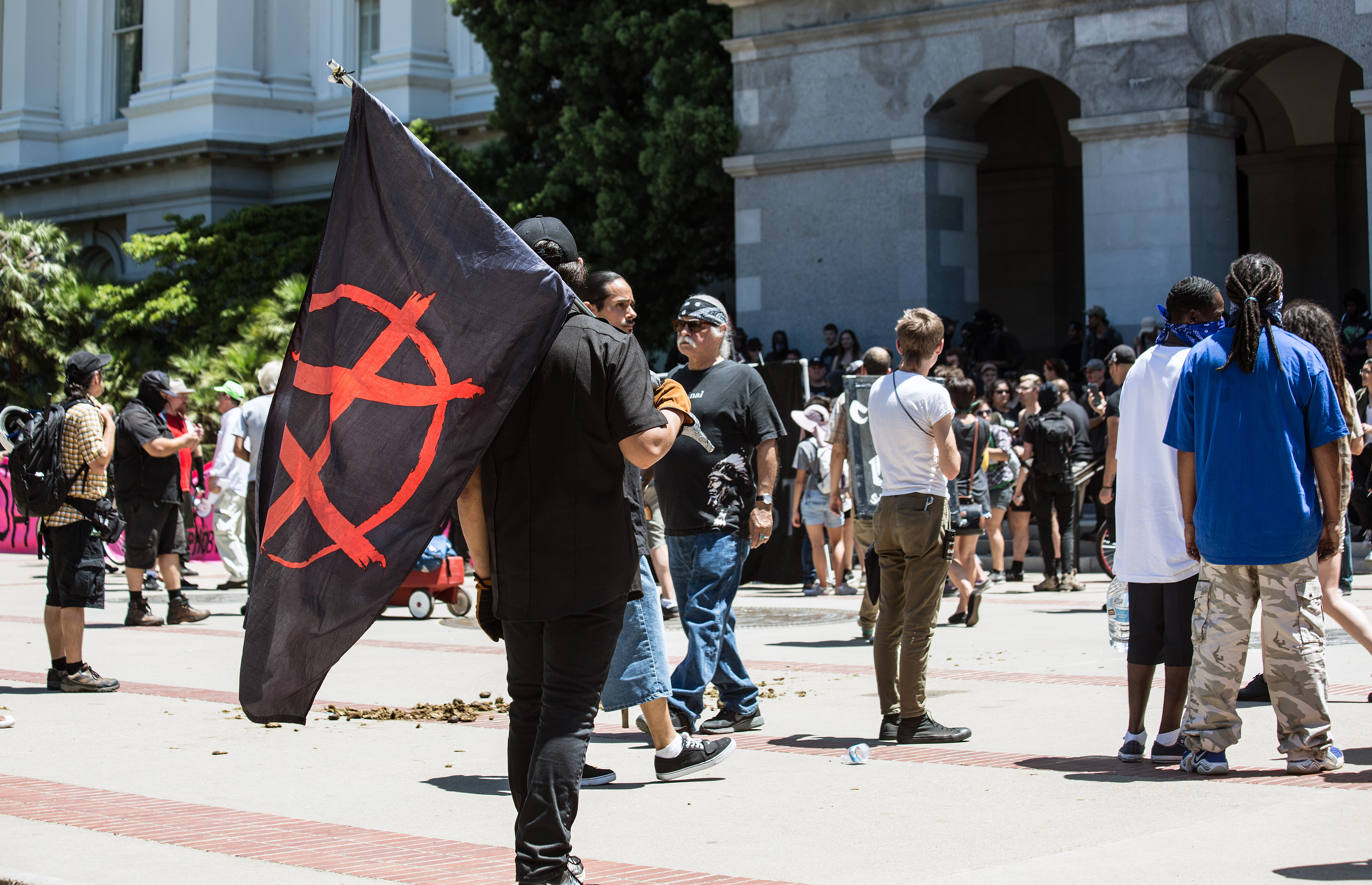
- A crowd outside the California State Capitol after the riot. An anarchist flag is carried in the foreground. Debris lies on the plaza.
- Date: June 26, 2016; 10 years ago
- Location: California State Capitol, Sacramento, California, US
- Methods: Riot, rally
- Result: Rally permit revoked (Note: "After the first violent event, we revoked the permit for the event." — CHP Capitol spokesman)

Parties
Neo-Nazis; Traditionalist Worker Party; Golden State Skinheads; National Socialist Movement	By Any Means Necessary (BAMN); Antifa Sacramento and other organizations and supporters,

Lead figures
Matthew Heimbach	Yvette Felarca

Number
30	300

Casualties
- Death: 0
- Injuries: 10
- Arrested: 4

The 2016 Sacramento riot was a civil disorder at a neo-Nazi and alt-right rally outside the California State Capitol in Sacramento, California on June 26, 2016. Alt-right and neo-Nazi groups including the Traditionalist Workers Party and other white supremacist groups were involved. Counter-protestors arrived at the rally to oppose the neo-Nazis and white supremacy. This included Antifa and their allies. Ten people were hospitalized for stabbing and laceration wounds with the majority of those hospitalized being counter-protesters.

== Riot ==
A neo-Nazi group called the Traditionalist Workers Party (TWP) had a permit (Note: Photo caption: "Anti-fascist counter-protesters parade through Sacramento after multiple people were stabbed during a clash between neo-Nazis holding a permitted rally and counter-protesters on Sunday at the state capitol in Sacramento, California, United States, June 26, 2016." — Reuters/Max Whittaker) for a rally on the west steps of the capitol building. They were joined by their affiliate, Golden State Skinheads (GSS).

Several groups led by Antifa (Anti-Fascist Action) Sacramento and BAMN (By Any Means Necessary) organized a counter protest. BAMN issued a statement saying that "collective power through mass militant direct action can shut these Nazis down and deal the fascists and white-supremacists a decisive tactical defeat". Antifa Sacramento stated that "fighting fascism was not a political duty, but a moral one", and called for direct action against them.

Anti-fascist protesters started arriving around 9:00 a.m. and just before 11:00 a.m. they confronted a TV crew, shouting "no cameras" at reporter Mike Luery of KCRA and the cameraman. The protesters grabbed Luery's mic and attempted to grab the camera.

Just before the TWP rally was scheduled to begin around noon, about 300 or more anarchists and other counter-protesters confronted the group. Members of the counter-protesters wore masks and used wooden bats, sticks, fireworks, and other weapons. A few people carried knives, though which side brought the knives used in the subsequent stabbings is unknown. About 400 people were involved in the violence. Ten people were hospitalized, all for multiple stabbing and laceration wounds, including two in critical life-threatening condition. Only one of the TWP and GSS members was stabbed. The capitol was locked down. Streets were closed. Over 100 police officers responded in riot gear and on horseback. They used rubber pellets and pepper-spray balls.

Matthew Heimbach, the chairman of the TWP, said they expected violence, although they planned the rally to be peaceful. TWP sent about 30 people together with Golden State Skinheads.

Yvette Felarca, an organiser for BAMN, stated that "mass militant action, with an integrated group of people" was used to shut down white nationalists. Felarca was filmed punching a man at the protests.

California Assemblyman Jim Cooper was at the Capitol during the riot. He said violence was unnecessary, and the counter-protesters could have shut down the rally with yelling.

Cres Vellucci, a police observer and representative for the National Lawyers Guild, described the violence as a "free-for-all". Vellucci said the police basically let people do what they wanted and fight it out.

== Participants ==
The Traditionalist Workers Party is listed as a white nationalist extremist group by the Southern Poverty Law Center, which describes TWP as the political wing of the Traditionalist Youth Network. The rally was also organized by the National Socialist Movement, a neo-Nazi organization.

Counter-protests were organized by BAMN, a militant left-wing group

== Aftermath ==
A middle school in Berkeley, California received an email threatening harm against its students if it did not fire Yvette Felarca, a teacher at the school who was caught on video violently attacking a protester and is an organizer with BAMN. In response, police increased security at the school and summer programs were moved to other locations. Because Felarca's actions were committed off-hours, no action can be taken against her unless the police file charges against her, which they did. Cate Cauguiran reported that the police and the California Highway Patrol were investigating a video of Felarca punching a protester.

Both sides of the protest have claimed victory. The TWP considered the action a success because "six Antifas have been hospitalized in critical condition, with many more being treated for lesser injuries" while they "only suffered one significant casualty." The counter-protesters considered it a success because they prevented the TWP from achieving their objective of holding a rally in Sacramento.

The TWP planned to be in Cleveland, Ohio for the Republican National Convention there in July.

The Anti-Defamation League wrote that despite both sides claiming success, it is "the white supremacists who most benefit from the free publicity" generated by the violence.

Genevieve Leigh, writing for the Trotskyists World Socialist Web Site, denounced the violence by counter-protesters. Leigh wrote that violence by small groups does not address the fundamental structural problems of a capitalist society and "ultimately play in the hands of the state."

On June 30, representatives and community leaders across Sacramento held a unity conference at the Capitol to denounce the violence on Sunday. Darrell Steinberg, the mayor of Sacramento, said “what happened here on Sunday is the opposite of what Sacramento is about.” Richard Pan, a Senator for Sacramento's 6th District, said ”Many people come here to articulate different views and it's important people have the ability to do so but violence is not the answer to addressing those issues."

As of July 19, 2017, one suspected neo-Nazi protester, William Scott Planer, and three counter-protesters were charged with crimes connected to the riot. Felarca was one of those arrested, being charged with felony assault and misdemeanor rioting. In 2019, the charges were dropped after she agreed to perform 90 hours of community service. The same year, the jury deadlocked at Planer's trial on assault charges. In April 2019, he pleaded no contest to assault likely to produce great bodily harm and was sentenced to four years in prison. Planer was released immediately since he'd already served two years in the county jail.

== See also ==
- 2017 Berkeley protests
- Unite the Right rally, another alt-right demonstration that turned violent with the NSM and TWP as one of the participants
