= California's 9th State Assembly district =

American legislative district

Current assemblymember
Heath Flora; R–Ripon
- Population (2010) • Voting age • Citizen voting age: 468,512; 334,848; 268,791
- Demographics: 34.41% White; 12.72% Black; 26.33% Latino; 22.20% Asian; 0.85% Native American; 1.45% Hawaiian/Pacific Islander; 0.27% other; 1.78% remainder of multiracial
- Registered voters: 268,490
- Registration: 40.19% Republican; 32.88% Democratic; 18.83% No party preference

California's 9th State Assembly district is one of 80 California State Assembly districts. It is currently represented by Republican Heath Flora of Ripon.

== District profile ==
After the 2021 redistricting, the 9th district contains part of the city of Sacramento and its southeastern suburbs. The district also extends southward through Stockton, and down into Stanislaus County, including parts of Amador County and Calaveras County.

Sacramento County – 28.0%

- Elk Grove
- Florin
- Galt
- Parkway
- Sacramento – 32.4%

San Joaquin County – 10.3%

- Lodi – ~100.0%

== Election results from statewide races ==
Year	Office	Results
2024	President	Trump 60.4 – 37.1%
2024	Senator (Full)	Garvey 62.6 – 37.4%
2024	Senator (Partial)	Garvey 62.6 – 37.4%
2022	Governor	Dahle 65.6 – 34.4%
2022	Senator	Meuser 62.5 – 37.5%
2021	Recall	No 61.3 – 38.7%
2020	President	Biden 62.5 – 35.2%
2018	Governor	Newsom 59.7 – 40.3%
2018	Senator	Feinstein 53.7 – 46.3%
2016	President	Clinton 61.5 – 32.9%
2016	Senator	Harris 64.6 – 35.4%
2014	Governor	Brown 63.3 – 36.7%
2012	President	Obama 60.5 – 37.5%
2012	Senator	Feinstein 62.8 – 37.2%

== List of assembly members representing the district ==
Due to redistricting, the 9th district has been moved around different parts of the state. The current iteration resulted from the 2021 redistricting by the California Citizens Redistricting Commission.

Assembly members	Party	Years served	Counties represented	Notes
John M. Ward	Republican	January 5, 1885 – January 3, 1887	Butte	
Lewis Granger	Democratic	January 3, 1887 – January 7, 1889	Butte	
Lewis Burwell	Democratic	January 7, 1889 – January 5, 1891	Butte	
John J. Smith	Republican	January 5, 1891 – January 2, 1893	Butte	
Charles William Tindall	Democratic	January 2, 1893 – January 7, 1895	Mendocino	
John Bunyan Sanford	Democratic	January 7, 1895 – January 1, 1901	Mendocino	
William Hanen	Republican	January 1, 1901 – January 5, 1903	Mendocino	
Jo V. Snyder	Democratic	January 5, 1903 – January 2, 1905	Nevada	
Edward F. Whiting	Republican	January 2, 1905 – January 7, 1907	Nevada	
George W. Root	Republican	January 7, 1907 – January 4, 1909	Nevada	
Frank M. Rutherford	Republican	January 4, 1909 – January 6, 1913	Nevada	
George B. Finnegan	Democratic	January 6, 1913 – January 4, 1915	Nevada, Placer	
Frank M. Rutherford	Progressive	January 4, 1915 – January 8, 1917	Nevada, Placer	
Ivan H. Parker	Republican	January 8, 1917 – January 8, 1923	Nevada, Placer	
Cora Woodbridge	Republican	January 8, 1923 – January 7, 1929	Nevada, Placer	
Jerrold L. Seawell	Independent	January 7, 1929 – January 5, 1931	Nevada, Placer	
Charles F. Reindollar	Republican	January 5, 1931 – January 2, 1933	Marin	
Percy G. West	Republican	January 2, 1933 – January 7, 1935	Sacramento	
Earl D. Desmond	Democratic	January 7, 1935 – January 8, 1945	Sacramento	
Dwight H. Stephenson	Republican	January 8, 1945 – January 3, 1949	Sacramento	
John E. Moss	Democratic	January 3, 1949 – January 3, 1953	Sacramento	
Roy J. Nielsen	Republican	January 5, 1953 – January 5, 1959	Sacramento	
Edwin L. Z'berg	Democratic	January 5, 1959 – November 30, 1974	Sacramento	
Edwin L. Z'berg	Democratic	January 5, 1959 – November 30, 1974	Sacramento, Yolo	
Michael Wornum	Democratic	December 2, 1974 – November 30, 1978	Marin, Sonoma	
Bill Filante	Republican	December 4, 1978 – November 30, 1992	Marin, Sonoma	
Phillip Isenberg	Democratic	December 7, 1992 – November 30, 1996	Sacramento	
Deborah Ortiz	Democratic	December 2, 1996 – November 30, 1998	Sacramento	
Darrell Steinberg	Democratic	December 7, 1998 – November 30, 2004	Sacramento	
Dave Jones	Democratic	December 6, 2004 – November 30, 2010	Sacramento	
Roger Dickinson	Democratic	December 6, 2010 – November 30, 2012	Sacramento	
Richard Pan	Democratic	December 3, 2012 – November 30, 2014	Sacramento, San Joaquin	
Jim Cooper	Democratic	December 1, 2014 – November 30, 2022	Sacramento, San Joaquin	
Heath Flora	Republican	December 5, 2022 – present	Amador, Calaveras, Sacramento, San Joaquin, Stanislaus	

== Election results (1990–present) ==
=== 2024 ===
2024 California State Assembly 9th district election
Primary election
Party	Candidate	Votes	%
Republican	Heath Flora (incumbent)	65,952	73.2
American Independent	Tami Nobriga	21,946	24.4
Democratic	Rosella Rowlison (write-in)	2,139	2.4
Democratic	Belinda Smith (write-in)	87	0.1
Total votes		90,124	100.0
General election
Republican	Heath Flora (incumbent)	129,268	70.1
American Independent	Tami Nobriga	55,169	29.9
Total votes		184,437	100.0
Republican hold			

=== 2022 ===
2022 California State Assembly 9th district election
Primary election
Party	Candidate	Votes	%
Republican	Heath Flora (incumbent)	65,647	99.8
Democratic	Mushtaq A. Tahirkheli (write-in)	142	0.2
Total votes		65,789	100.0
General election
Republican	Heath Flora (incumbent)	96,990	69.2
Democratic	Mushtaq A. Tahirkheli	43,109	30.8
Total votes		140,099	100.0
Republican hold			

=== 2020 ===
2020 California State Assembly 9th district election
Primary election
Party	Candidate	Votes	%
Democratic	Jim Cooper (incumbent)	50,609	43.8
Republican	Eric M. Rigard	33,997	29.4
Democratic	Tracie Stafford	27,974	24.2
Democratic	Mushtaq A. Tahirkheli	3,015	2.6
Total votes		115,595	100.0
General election
Democratic	Jim Cooper (incumbent)	142,088	65.8
Republican	Eric M. Rigard	73,742	34.2
Total votes		215,830	100.0
Democratic hold			

=== 2018 ===
2018 California State Assembly 9th district election
Primary election
Party	Candidate	Votes	%
Democratic	Jim Cooper (incumbent)	49,675	67.8
Democratic	Harry He	11,927	16.3
Democratic	Mario Garcia	11,643	15.9
Total votes		73,245	100.0
General election
Democratic	Jim Cooper (incumbent)	92,951	68.3
Democratic	Harry He	43,225	31.7
Total votes		136,176	100.0
Democratic hold			

=== 2016 ===
2016 California State Assembly 9th district election
Primary election
Party	Candidate	Votes	%
Democratic	Jim Cooper (incumbent)	64,879	69.9
Republican	Timothy Scott Gorsulowsky	27,924	30.1
Total votes		92,803	100.0
General election
Democratic	Jim Cooper (incumbent)	109,979	66.8
Republican	Timothy Scott Gorsulowsky	54,729	33.2
Total votes		164,708	100.0
Democratic hold			

=== 2014 ===
2014 California State Assembly 9th district election
Primary election
Party	Candidate	Votes	%
Democratic	Jim Cooper	18,923	31.1
Democratic	Darrell Fong	17,752	29.2
Republican	Tim Gorsulowsky	10,938	18.0
Republican	Manuel J. Martin	8,111	13.3
Democratic	Diana Rodriguez-Suruki	5,080	8.4
Total votes		60,804	100.0
General election
Democratic	Jim Cooper	50,188	55.5
Democratic	Darrell Fong	40,220	44.5
Total votes		90,408	100.0
Democratic hold			

=== 2012 ===
2012 California State Assembly 9th district election
Primary election
Party	Candidate	Votes	%
Democratic	Richard Pan (incumbent)	24,617	38.1
Republican	Antonio "Tony" Amador	13,060	20.2
Republican	Sophia Gonzales Scherman	10,029	15.5
Democratic	Tom Y. Santos	8,200	12.7
Republican	Edward J. Nemeth	6,823	10.5
Peace and Freedom	C.T. Weber	1,950	3.0
Total votes		64,679	100.0
General election
Democratic	Richard Pan (incumbent)	86,092	58.9
Republican	Antonio "Tony" Amador	60,136	41.1
Total votes		146,228	100.0
Democratic hold			

=== 2010 ===
2010 California State Assembly 9th district election
Party	Candidate	Votes	%
Democratic	Roger Dickinson	67,294	68.0
Republican	Rick D. Redding	24,766	25.0
Peace and Freedom	Daniel A. Costa	6,941	7.0
Total votes		99,001	100.0
Democratic hold			

=== 2008 ===
2008 California State Assembly 9th district election
Party	Candidate	Votes	%
Democratic	Dave Jones (incumbent)	92,038	72.8
Republican	Mali Currington	26,622	21.1
Peace and Freedom	Gerald Frink	7,744	6.1
Total votes		126,404	100.0
Democratic hold			

=== 2006 ===
2006 California State Assembly 9th district election
Party	Candidate	Votes	%
Democratic	Dave Jones (incumbent)	61,932	69.9
Republican	William Chan	26,652	30.1
Total votes		88,584	100.0
Democratic hold			

=== 2004 ===
2004 California State Assembly 9th district election
Party	Candidate	Votes	%
Democratic	Dave Jones	77,880	66.7
Republican	Gaspar Garcia	32,734	28.0
Libertarian	Gale Morgan	6,098	5.2
Total votes		116,712	100.0
Democratic hold			

=== 2002 ===
2002 California State Assembly 9th district election
Party	Candidate	Votes	%
Democratic	Darrell Steinberg	58,883	69.9
Republican	David A. Pegos	22,146	26.2
Libertarian	Douglas M. Poston	3,322	3.9
Total votes		84,351	100.0
Democratic hold			

=== 2000 ===
2000 California State Assembly 9th district election
Party	Candidate	Votes	%
Democratic	Darrell Steinberg (incumbent)	75,953	70.2
Republican	Charles Hargrave	24,572	22.7
Green	Jan Louis Bergeron	5,698	5.3
Natural Law	Bruce B. Saunders	2,012	1.9
Total votes		108,235	100.0
Democratic hold			

=== 1998 ===
1998 California State Assembly 9th district election
Party	Candidate	Votes	%
Democratic	Darrell Steinberg	66,867	72.3
Republican	Mike Dismukes	25,591	27.7
Total votes		92,818	100.0
Democratic hold			

=== 1996 ===
1996 California State Assembly 9th district election
Party	Candidate	Votes	%
Democratic	Deborah Ortiz	69,074	65.2
Republican	Richard Davis	30,769	29.1
Reform	Akili Jaye	3,558	3.4
Natural Law	Bruce B. Saunders	2,486	2.3
Total votes		105,887	100.0
Democratic hold			

=== 1994 ===
1994 California State Assembly 9th district election
Party	Candidate	Votes	%
Democratic	Phillip Isenberg (incumbent)	68,686	69.9
Republican	Beth Lofton	29,513	30.1
Total votes		98,199	100.0
Democratic hold			

=== 1992 ===
1992 California State Assembly 9th district election
Party	Candidate	Votes	%
Democratic	Phillip Isenberg (incumbent)	83,643	66.0
Republican	David Reade	33,990	26.8
Green	Richard Geiselhart	9,081	7.2
Total votes		126,714	100.0
Democratic gain from Republican			

=== 1990 ===
1990 California State Assembly 9th district election
Party	Candidate	Votes	%
Republican	Bev Hansen (incumbent)	94,722	76.5
Libertarian	Eric W. Roberts	29,101	23.5
Total votes		123,823	100.0
Republican hold			

== See also ==
- California State Assembly
- California State Assembly districts
- Districts in California
