= 1996 San Francisco Board of Supervisors election =

- November 5, 1996

The 1996 San Francisco Board of Supervisors elections occurred on November 5, 1996. Six of the eleven seats were contested. Four incumbents and two open seats and were up for election. All seats were elected at-large. Each voter was allowed to cast at most six votes.

Municipal elections in California are officially non-partisan, though most candidates in San Francisco do receive funding and support from various political parties.

== Results ==
The results of the election were as follows:

San Francisco Board of Supervisors elections, 1996
Candidate	Votes	%
Barbara Kaufman	124,716	
Sue Bierman	117,560	
Leland Yee	103,413	
Leslie Rachel Katz	100,890	
Michael Yaki	94,272	
José Medina	92,977	
Margo St. James	78,669	
Victor Marquez	62,646	
Carolene Marks	56,206	
Donna Casey	44,176	
Harold M. Hoogasian	40,321	
Manuel A. Rosales	38,413	
Andy Clark	30,005	
Arthur M. Jackson	29,930	
Maria Martinez	24,312	
Bruce Quan, Jr.	23,073	
Robert Squeri	17,624	
Carlos Petroni	17,293	
Scott Durcanin	16,070	
Lucrecia Bermudez	12,079	
Lorin Scott Rosemond	11,544	
Robert Coleman	11,017	
Len Pettigrew	10,293	
Teresita Williams	10,065	
Joseph B. Konopka	8,731	
Shawn O'Hearn	8,533	
Susan C. Zárate	7,768	
Ellis Keyes	6,481	
Turnout	{{{votes}}}	61.90%
