= Movement for Justice by Any Means Necessary =

The Movement for Justice was set up in 1995 by people around the Kingsway College Student Union in the London Borough of Camden to tackle racism in institutional and established forms. The group confronted organised fascism as well as death in custody and wider racism to black people as well as travellers, refugees and asylum seekers. It is also the sister group to the American organization The Coalition to Defend Affirmative Action, Integration & Immigrant Rights, and Fight for Equality By Any Means Necessary (BAMN).

It is led up by members of the Revolutionary Internationalist League (RIL), a Trotskyist group.

It has been described by a former member as a "cultish Trotskyist group" that makes use of "guilt for coercion".

== History ==
According to the Daily Telegraph, it was set up by Tony Gard in the mid-1990s. In 2020, the Times said that "While photographs of its protests highlight young black members, the key leaders are two white Marxists", naming Gard, a former primary school teacher now in his late 70s, and Karen Doyle.

=== Early years ===
The group first grew following the murder of Stephen Lawrence and the campaign that followed. The group went on to campaign for justice for the murders by racists and in police custody of many others including Rolan Adams, and Michael Tachie-Menson.

The group took part in the demonstrations to close down the British National Party headquarters in the area and helped the Youth against Racism in Europe to build an anti-racist campaign through this. They also campaigned with the YRE and local community to fight drove the BNP off Brick Lane.

In 1993 a Kingsway student Shah Alam was nearly killed in a racist attack in Poplar, East London and they organised the Justice for Shah Alam Campaign which organised a march, public meetings, press conferences and court pickets to get the racists convicted and jailed.

After the death of Brian Douglas, they helped get Lambeth Unison (public service workers union) and Kingsway College Student Union with the campaign.

The organisation also concentrated on mass non-co-operation with the 1995 Asylum and Immigration Bill and in September 1995, published a pamphlet entitled Howard's Racist Immigration and Asylum Bill - What it is and how to fight it. In 1995 the group orchestrated a paint attack on Brian Mawhinney, Tory MP outside Parliament at the state opening and Queen's speech, because of what they saw as his deliberate use of emotive and misrepresentative language about 'British people fearing immigrants flooding the country' which were seen by many as an incitement to racial hatred. In 1996, leading members Tony Gard and Karen Doyle, then a schoolgirl, were convicted of assault after this protest.

After the death of Oscar Okoye in 1996, the group came under attack from Lee Jasper and Brian Paddick.

=== After 1997 ===
The group continued to oppose immigration, asylum legislation after Labour took power.

Its chair in the early 2000s was Alex Olowade. In 2001, Alex Olowade was sacked from his job with Lambeth Council after he led a campaign to expose racism in the department and he allegedly abused a manager, but a tribunal ruled he had been dismissed unfairly, although he was not reinstated.

In 2001 after the police shot dead a man with a replica gun cigarette lighter in Brixton, the group organised a demonstration.

=== 2015-2018 Yarls Wood Hunger strikes and demonstrations ===
In 2015 MfJ organised with refugee women at Yarl's Wood Immigration Removal Centre. Organising with women on hunger strike inside the detention centre and with those whose release they had helped secure. The demonstrations grew greatly in size over this time. The success drew in support from other groups such as Sisters Uncut, until a split in 2018 which lead to a decline in the protests.

=== Recent activities ===
According to The Daily Telegraph, the group was the key organiser behind the "Day of Rage" protests following the Grenfell Tower fire.

In December 2020, the group drew attention from The Times for campaigning to stop the deportations of foreign national criminals.

== Infiltration by undercover police ==
Former Metropolitan Police Special Branch undercover officer Peter Francis, who as part of the secretive Special Demonstration Squad infiltrated the YRE and associated groups between 1993 and 1997, gathered information the MFJ. He claimed in a 2014 statement issued through his solicitor that he had been a founding member.
