= 1998 San Francisco Board of Supervisors election =

- November 3, 1998

The 1998 San Francisco Board of Supervisors elections occurred on November 3, 1998. Five of the eleven seats were contested. Five incumbents, three of whom were appointed by Mayor Willie Brown, were up for election.

This election was the last using at-large seats, a system that effectively reduces representation of minority points of view. Subsequent Board of Supervisors elections were to district seats through a plan ratified by the voters in 1996.

Municipal elections in California are officially non-partisan, though most candidates in San Francisco do receive funding and support from various political parties.

== Results ==
Each voter is allowed to cast at most five votes.

Below are the final results of the November 3, 1998 election for Board of Supervisors:

San Francisco Board of Supervisors elections, 1998
Candidate	Votes	%
Tom Ammiano (incumbent)	120,291	47.98
Gavin Newsom (incumbent)	109,015	43.98
Mabel Teng (incumbent)	95,093	37.93
Mark Leno (incumbent)	82,449	32.89
Amos Brown (incumbent)	67,554	26.94
Victor Marquez	58,935	23.51
Rose Tsai	58,571	23.36
Donna Casey	57,788	23.05
Denise D'Anne	35,244	14.06
Lucrecia Bermudez	23,115	9.22
Shawn O'Hearn	17,664	7.05
Jim Reid	16,902	6.74
Carlos Petroni	16,293	6.50
Len Pettigrew	15,049	6.00
Tahnee Stair	11,621	4.64
Frederick Hobson	8,048	3.21
Sam Lucas	7,858	3.13
Turnout	{{{votes}}}	55.8%
