= Sacramento Police Department =

Police department in Sacramento, California

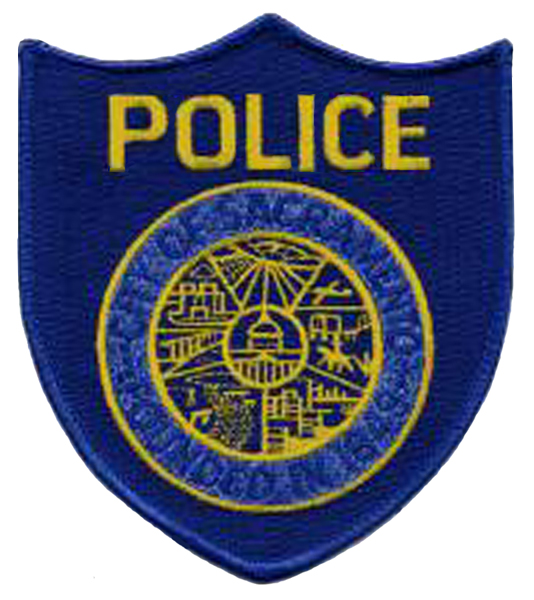
- Patch of the Sacramento Police Department
- Abbreviation: SPD
- Motto: Service, Protection, Dedication since 1849

Agency overview
- Formed: 1849; 177 years ago
- Employees: 933 total FTE which includes sworn and professional staff
- Annual budget: $158 million (2021)

Jurisdictional structure
- Operations jurisdiction: Sacramento, California, United States
- Area: 100.70 sq mi (260.81 km2)
- Population: 526,954 (2025)
- Legal jurisdiction: City of Sacramento, California
- Governing body: Sacramento City Council
- General nature: Local civilian police

Operational structure
- Headquarters: 5770 Freeport Blvd; Sacramento, California
- Officers: 648 (FTE)
- Unsworn members: 285 (FTE)
- Agency executive: Katherine Lester, Chief of Police
- Districts: 7

Facilities
- Helicopters: 2 mission helicopters, 1 training
- K9s: 8 K9, and 1 EOD K9

Website
- www.sacpd.org

The Sacramento Police Department (SACPD) is the municipal law enforcement agency of the city of Sacramento, California. On August 11, 2017, Daniel Hahn was sworn in and became the city's first African American police chief. The current chief of police is Kathy Lester.

== History ==
By 1849, Sacramento had grown rapidly from a small settlement at Sutter's Fort to a town of 10,000 people following the discovery of gold at Sutter's Mill. On August 1, 1849, the City of Sacramento was founded when the first meeting of a Common Council was held. At that time, the City boundaries were north to the American river, east to 31st Street, south to Y Street and west to the Sacramento River, encompassing 4.5 square miles. N. C. Cunningham was appointed as the first City Marshall (the position now known as Chief of Police) and was given two deputies to enforce the law.

The city did not have a building for a police station or jail, so it briefly used two barges, first the Stafford and then Stirling, before buying the ship LaGrange in June 1850. The LaGrange was retrofitted, moored at the foot of H Street on the river and was the county's jail from 1851 to 1859, when it sank due to heavy rain.

As a result of the Gold Rush in 1852, Sacramento had grown in size until the population had reached 150,000 persons. The Police Department was also increased to six men. In addition to normal police duties, these six officers had to deal with the first Chinese Tong War to ever occur outside of China. A murder plot also occurred during this period. Three men, one of them the Public Administrator, plotted to kill 55 leading wealthy Sacramentans for their money. The Police Department identified the murderers and arrested two of them after the first killing. Both men were subsequently convicted and hanged for their crime.

The Police Department grew slowly from 1849 to 1913 when it had 36 officers. The men of the department patrolled the city on foot and on bicycles. The department had two bicycles at that time. A typical bicycle beat covered about one half of the entire city, or about 200 square blocks. In those years, the department did not have radio equipment. Communication between the Police Station and the beat officers was accomplished by telephones located in specially designated "call boxes" distributed throughout the city for this purpose.

Modern police history, as we now know it, began in 1917. The city's population had declined to just 90,000 people after the Gold Rush boom, but the department now totaled 100 men. During this period, the department moved into the new Hall of Justice building at 6th and I Streets.

During the Great Recession, the department's budget decreased by 30%, causing it to lay off 300 officers.

In 2016, two officers tried to run over and then fatally shot Joseph Mann, an African American man armed with a knife who was about 27 feet away. In 2017, the Sacramento County District Attorney cleared the two officers of any legal wrongdoing, concluding that they were justified in shooting Mann, but after an internal investigation by the Sacramento Police Department, neither Tennis nor Lozoya remained on the force.

In April 2017, a video of a Sacramento officer beating a jaywalker prompted a criminal investigation.

On March 18, 2018, two Sacramento officers shot and killed Stephon Clark. During protests following the news that the officers would not be charged, Sacramento Police arrested 80 people, including a journalist. One woman was injured by a police vehicle.

The Sacramento Police Department has around 600 sworn officers but as a capital city, the Department should have between 1,050-1,200 sworn officers. The Department admitted in May 2025 that a minimum 200 vacancies must be filled. The number of vacant sworn officer positions was given as one reason that some current officers made double to triple their salary, with overtime.

== Personnel killed in the line of duty ==
As of 2025, and since the establishment of the Sacramento Police Department, 18 officers have been recognized as deaths in the line of duty: eleven due to gunfire, plus one in an accidental gun firing, one through a heart attack, two in a motorcycle accident, one in a vehicular assault, and two in a vehicular pursuit.

Chief of Police Erskine G. Fish, who died from gunfire in 1935, was remembered by the radio series Dragnet, at the end of the 9th episode, which aired on August 4, 1949.

== See also ==
- List of law enforcement agencies in California
- Sacramento County Sheriff's Department
- 2022 Sacramento shooting
