= Scott Jones (sheriff) =

Sheriff of Sacramento County, California, U.S.

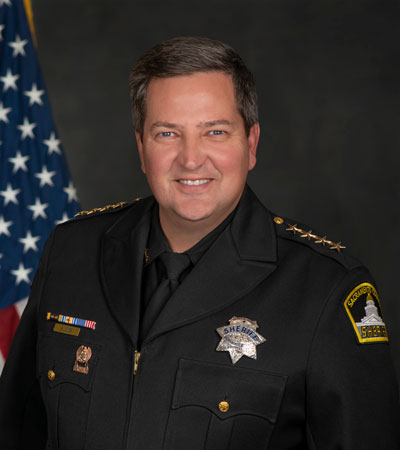

36th Sheriff of Sacramento County
- In office December 10, 2010 – December 9, 2022
- Preceded by: John McGinnis
- Succeeded by: Jim Cooper

Personal details
- Born: Scott Robert Jones; August 10, 1967 (age 58)
- Party: Republican
- Spouse: Christy
- Children: 4
- Education: California State University, Sacramento (BS); Lincoln Law School of Sacramento (JD)

Scott Robert Jones (born August 10, 1967) is an American attorney, politician, and former law enforcement officer who served as the sheriff of Sacramento County, California from 2010-2022. Jones was first elected in 2010, winning re-election to his post in 2014 and again in 2018.

== Early life and education ==
Jones was raised in Southern California and moved to Sacramento with his family as a child. He earned a Bachelor of Science degree in criminal justice from the California State University, Sacramento and a Juris Doctor from the Lincoln Law School of Sacramento in 1998.

== Career ==
Jones joined the Sacramento County Sheriff's Department in 1989. During his tenure, he has served in corrections, patrol, and legal affairs. He later served as the department's legal advisor.

=== 2016 U.S. congressional campaign ===
In November 2015, Jones announced he would run for U.S. Congress in California's 7th congressional district in 2016. Jones, a Republican, faced incumbent Democrat Ami Bera in the November 2016 general election. Bera defeated Jones in the general election, winning 51% of the vote to Jones's 49%. The margin of victory was 4,802 votes.

Jones was endorsed by the Northern California Carpenters Regional Council, a labor union for carpenters. Focuses of his campaign included economic issues, assistance for veterans and seniors, immigration, and national security.

=== 2022 U.S. congressional campaign ===
In January 2022, Jones announced that he would retire as sheriff and run for California's 3rd congressional district in the 2022 election. He was defeated in the June primary after receiving 16.2 percent of the vote.

== Political positions ==
Jones believes in a pathway to legal status for immigrants who are in the United States illegally, and he is opposed to the deportation of illegal immigrants. He is personally opposed to abortion but does not believe it should be illegal. He opposes Republican Party efforts to defund Planned Parenthood. He supports gay marriage. He is opposed to a minimum wage increase and to the legalization of recreational marijuana.

=== COVID-19 ===
In 2020, the Sacramento County Sheriff's Department received $104 million in federal coronavirus relief funds after it stated that its employees would be "substantially dedicated" to addressing COVID-19 in the form of public education and breaking up social gatherings. However, in June 2020, in response to a statewide mandate to wear masks in public to address the COVID-19 pandemic, Sheriff Jones said that his deputies would not enforce the mandate. In November 2020, hours before the state was about to announce new stay-at-home restrictions and curfews across much of the state, Jones announced that his department "would not enforce any health or emergency orders related to curfews, staying at home, Thanksgiving or other social gatherings inside or outside the home", or any other orders in effect at the time or in the future, calling emergency health orders "oppressive", "arbitrary" and "unrealistic". In an interview in late November 2020, Dr. Peter Beilenson, the Sacramento County health director, said that Jones' lack of enforcement actions had worsened the spread of the coronavirus in the county. In early December 2020, the sheriff's office announced that Jones had tested positive for the virus, and dozens of sheriff's department employees had also tested positive.

== Personal life ==
Jones is married and has four children. He has served on the Make-A-Wish Foundation Northeastern California and Northern Nevada chapter board of directors since 2014.
