= BAMN =

American far-left group

- Coalition to Defend Affirmative Action, Integration & Immigrant Rights, and Fight for Equality By Any Means Necessary
- Formation: 1995
- Founded at: California, United States
- Type: Civil rights organisation
- Legal status: Active
- Website: www.bamn.com

The Coalition to Defend Affirmative Action, Integration & Immigrant Rights, and Fight for Equality By Any Means Necessary, commonly shortened to By Any Means Necessary (BAMN), is a militant, American far-left group that participates in protests and litigation to achieve its aims. It is a front organization for the Revolutionary Workers League.

== Origins ==
BAMN was formed in 1995 to oppose the July 20, 1995, decision by Regents of the University of California to ban affirmative action as The Coalition to Defend Affirmative Action By Any Means Necessary. It ran a slate of candidates in the April 1996 Associated Students of the University of California election on a platform of defeating California Proposition 209. The proposition passed in November, prohibiting state governmental institutions from considering race, sex, or ethnicity for employment, contracting, and education.

In 1997, BAMN expanded to Michigan, where it organized student support for the affirmative action policy of the University of Michigan Law School at Ann Arbor (UMLS) as a result of a challenge to that policy via Grutter v. Bollinger.

== Campaigns ==
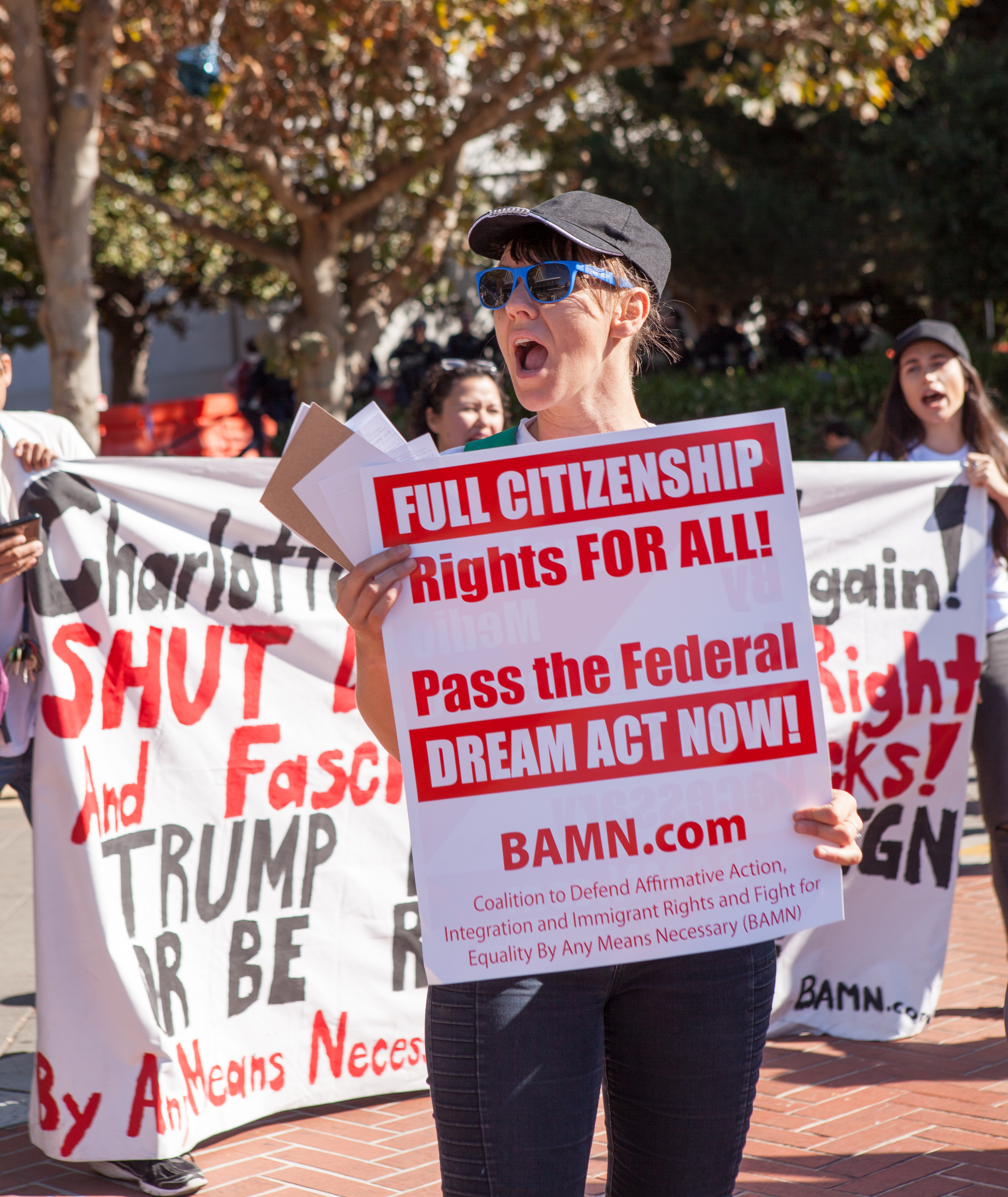
A protester at a September 2017 demonstration in Berkeley holds a BAMN sign reading "Full Citizenship Rights For All! Pass the Federal Dream Act Now!"

In December 2005, BAMN disrupted a meeting of the Michigan State Board of Canvassers in which the Board voted to put a measure that would prohibit race-based preferential treatment in higher education on the November 2006 ballot. They did so by shouting down officials and overturning chairs and tables.

In December 2014, BAMN helped to organize a week of anti-police and Black Lives Matter protest in the East Bay of the San Francisco Bay Area. One of these protests shut down a part of Interstate 80 and led to the mass arrest of 210 people. Ronald Cruz, an attorney and organizer for BAMN, said that BAMN demanded that all of the charges against the protesters be dropped. Another protest the same week resulted in violence and property damage. Cruz claimed the police were the aggressors.

== Attention by national law enforcement ==
In 2005, the American Civil Liberties Union reported that in 2002 the Federal Bureau of Investigation (FBI) identified BAMN as "thought to be involved in terrorist activities." According to the FBI, the group's protests were discussed in a meeting about alleged links to terrorist organizations.

In February 2019, the FBI opened an investigation into "domestic terrorism" against a California civil rights group whose members it called "extremists" after its 2016 alt-right protests, according to new documents to which some journalist has had access. The documents included in-person surveillance. The agency considered activism against "rape and sexual violence", and "policial brutality". The investigation started after a brawl that resulted in multiple people stabbed and beaten in a brawl in the city of Sacramento, considering it sufficient grounds to open a terrorism investigation, creating controversy about the criminalization of the civilian movements.

== Sacramento riot and recent activities ==
In June 2016, BAMN led a counter-protest against a rally held by the Traditionalist Worker Party, a white nationalist group, outside of the California State Capitol in Sacramento. Violence at the protests resulted in nine people being hospitalized, seven with stab wounds. Yvette Felarca, a BAMN spokeswoman, said their protest successfully "chased away the neo-Nazis and kept them from recruiting new members."

In July 2017, a year after the riot, authorities arrested Felarca and charged her with "inciting and participating in a riot and assault likely to cause great bodily injury." Felarca and her lawyer, BAMN's national chair Shanta Driver, say the white nationalists were the aggressors and BAMN members had the right to defend themselves. Felarca told The Guardian that she was stabbed in the arm and struck in the head which resulted in her getting stitches.

In December 2018 the group were present during the Central American migrant caravans of 2018. Various militants were present during riots and demonstrations against the security forces, in the city of Tijuana, holding back the eviction migrants in some parts of the city. Some civilian organizations distanced themselves from the group, for their violent protests and history of riots in the United States.

== See also ==
- Antifa (United States)
- Movement for Justice by Any Means Necessary
- Refuse Fascism
- Revolutionary Workers League (U.S.)
