= Internationalist Workers Party (Fourth International) =

The Internationalist Workers Party (Fourth International) (IWP or IWP(FI)) was a Trotskyist political party in the United States. IWP was the American affiliate of the Morenoist International Workers League (Fourth International) (IWLfi).

IWP was unique in that it was the first American Trotskyist organization whose membership was primarily Hispanic and Latino Americans.

== History ==
=== Origins ===
The group began as the Revolutionary Workers Front-Frente Revolucionario de los Trabajadores in March 1980. The original core included two individual members of the International, exiled Sandinistas and people who had left the Socialist Workers Party. Others were recruited during the RWF-FRTs "general political work with independent workers".

By 1982 the organization had 120 members in seven U.S. cities, fractions within ten unions and two newspapers, the Spanish El Bolschevique and the English Working Class Opposition.

=== 1982 merger ===
In 1982, the Morneoist international, International Workers League (Fourth International) (IWLfi), held a World Congress. Both the RWF-FRT and the Revolutionary Unity League (or "Turnerites") sent representatives. With the encouragement of the leadership of the International, the two groups set up a "leadership team" to co-ordinate joint strikes, demonstrations and campaigns. The two groups also had discussions where their political differences were hammered out and eventually planned a unification convention. This convention met on June 26–27, 1982 and a new organization, the Internationalist Workers Party (Fourth International) was founded.

The unity convention elected a nine-member central committee: Harry Turner, Leon Perez, Susana Fernandez, Roberto Cardenas, Loretta Sylvis, Carol Williams, Anna Gomez, Rolando Cordoba, Marc Elliott, and alternate member Fredrico De Leon. A control commission was also elected made up of Susana Fernandez, Numa Alvarez and Sonia Morales. At the central committees first meeting a political bureau was elected consisting of Turner, Perez and Gomez. Leon Perez was also named "national organizer".

The political resolution adopted at the founding conference charecrering the new organization as "an action oriented propaganda group" and favored the creation of a labor party, provided the IWP(FI) would be allowed to exist as an organized group within it and "transform it into a truly revolutionary party." In practice they worked within the Peace and Freedom Party and were able to win three PFP primaries in 1984: Sonia Cruz for state senator in Los Angeles; James Green for Congress in California's 24th congressional district; and John O'Brien for an assembly seat. In other elections it urged its members to vote, where possible for the SWP, Workers World Party, and Communist Party candidates in that order.

=== 1984 split ===
The group worked to bring together the various Trotskyist groups in the US under one banner and hosted two Emergency National Trotskyist Conferences in 1983 and 1982. It was also in talks to merge with the Revolutionary Workers League.

However, in July 1984 a severe factional crisis wracked the party with the eventual establishment of the International Socialist League (Fourth International) with Turner in the leadership.

The IWP(FI) remained the official Morenoist affiliate in the United States, though the ISL(FI) remained a "sympathizing section". The ISL(FI) began publishing a newspaper, Workers Organizer, in November 1985, stating it had branches in New York, Los Angeles, Minneapolis and Wisconsin.

== See also ==
- American Left
- Socialist Alternative (United States)
- Socialist Workers Party (United States)
- Democratic Socialists of America
- History of left-wing politics in the United States
