= Killing of Joseph Mann =

Killing by police in Sacramento, United States

- Joseph Mann
- Date: July 11, 2016
- Location: Del Paso Boulevard, Sacramento, California, U.S.; 38.60461°N 121.46208°W
- Type: Shooting
- Participants: Randy Lozoya and John Tennis
- Deaths: Joseph Mann

On July 11, 2016, Randy Lozoya and John Tennis, two Sacramento police officers, attempted to run over, and later shot and killed Joseph Mann, a 51-year-old mentally ill and homeless African-American man armed with a knife.

== Incident ==
Police received 9-1-1 calls about a man standing in the street waving a knife. Dispatchers told police that Mann had a knife and gun, and that he was acting erratically. Mann was carrying a 4-inch knife when police encountered him, but no gun was ever found.

Mann did not cooperate with the first officers who arrived at the scene. Mann's family describes him as "doing karate moves and zigzagging back and forth across the street as he tried to walk away from the officers." The initial responding officers ordered Mann to drop his knife, and get on the ground. He did not comply, and instead threw a thermos at the police cruiser, and shouted threats as he walked down Del Paso Boulevard.

When Lozoya and Tennis arrived, their cruiser's dash cam audio recorded one of them as saying, "Fuck this guy. I'm going to hit him." The other officer replies, "Okay. Go for it. Go for it." They missed Mann the first time, and attempted again to try to hit him with their cruiser. As they accelerated toward Mann, one officer said, "Watch it! Watch! Watch", as Mann jumped into the median strip to avoid the cruiser. After missing Mann the second time, the other officer said, "We'll get him. We'll get him." They stopped the cruiser, exited it, and chased Mann on foot. The officers fatally shot Mann moments later. Police fired 18 shots, 14 of which hit Mann. The Sacramento Bee suggested that Mann was about 27 feet from the officers when he was shot. Mann died at the scene.

== Aftermath ==
The shooting led to protests by local religious leaders and Black leaders. Black Lives Matter demanded the release of the dash cam videos, and criticized the police for escalating the situation. The Sacramento Police Department initially did not release the videos, but later released three dash cam videos, a surveillance camera video, and two 9-1-1 call audios after pressure from city officials, including Sacramento Mayor Kevin Johnson, as well as The Sacramento Bee, obtaining cellphone footage from a citizen showing the shooting of Mann. The audio of the dash cam videos was enhanced by The Sacramento Bee.

A toxicology report found that Mann had methamphetamine in his system.

Police spokesperson Bryce Heinlein told reporters that using a vehicle as a deadly weapon is something covered in use of force training. According to Heinlein, Lozoya and Tennis were placed on "modified duty". Mann's family has filed both a claim against Sacramento, and also a federal lawsuit. In addition to other shootings by police officers around the country, Mann's shooting prompted the Sacramento City Council to propose a use-of-force policy change which restricts the use of lethal force, and examines the use of police vehicles.

On January 27, 2017, the Sacramento County District Attorney cleared the two officers of any legal wrongdoing, concluding that they were justified in shooting Mann, but, following an internal investigation by the Sacramento Police Department, Tennis and Lozoya left the force.

Mann’s father, William Mann Sr., reached an out-of-court settlement in February 2017 that paid $719,000, sources told The Sacramento Bee. Joseph Mann's siblings were barred from suing the city of Sacramento until the 9th Circuit Federal court of appeals ruled in 2020 that their case could proceed.

== Gallery ==
External videos
- Bystander cellphone video

Police dashboard camera (#1)

Police dashboard camera (#2)

Police dashboard camera (#3)

Surveillance camera

== See also ==
- Shooting of Stephon Clark – an African-American man shot by the Sacramento Police Department
- Gidone Busch – a mentally disturbed man shot by the New York City Police Department
- List of killings by law enforcement officers in the United States
- Police brutality in the United States
