= Revolutionary Workers League (U.S.) =

- Abbreviation: RWL
- Founded: 1976
- Ideology: Trotskyism
- Political position: Far-left
- International affiliation: International Trotskyist Committee for the Political Regeneration of the Fourth International

The Revolutionary Workers League (RWL) is a Trotskyist political party in the United States. RWL formed in the late 1970s by independent Trotskyist activists who believed that none of the pre-existing Trotskyist organizations in the United States were politically healthy enough to join. The RWL still has about 20 active members, although it rarely carries out public events or produces regular statements and material.

== History ==
=== Origins ===
The RWL was founded in 1976 by Peter Sollenberger and Leland Sanderson, two former Harvard graduate students from Detroit. Although Sollenberger and Sanderson were briefly contacts of the Spartacist League, neither of them was ever a member. They organized among clerical workers at the University of Michigan, Ann Arbor as well as among LGBT rights groups.

=== International affiliation ===
In 1979, the RWL joined Alan Thornett's Trotskyist International Liaison Committee (TILC).

In October 1982, negotiations opened between RWL and the Internationalist Workers Party (Fourth International) (IWPFI) since October 1982. In 1983, the RWL participated in the IWPFI's Emergency National Trotskyist Conference. In 1984, RWL accepted the IWPFI's invitation to participate in the Morenoist IWPFI World Congress.

In summer 1984, RWL left TILC and created the International Trotskyist Committee for the Political Regeneration of the Fourth International (ITC).

=== Subsequent history ===
In 1981 they absorbed the Socialist League (Democratic-Centralist), a group of ex-adherents of Tim Wohlforth that had been expelled from the Workers League of the United States in the mid-1970s. The SL(DC), shrinking since its formation, led by Steve Zeltzer, and had its main base in San Francisco. By 1982 the RWL was credited with about 40 members.

The RWL supported anti-administration forces within the United Auto Workers. They backed the United Front Caucus in the November 1982 elections in Local 600 at River Rouge, Michigan, which secured 10% of the vote. It was unclear how many members the RWL had within Local 600.

In the 1980s, RWL worked within the Peace & Freedom Party in California. There they formed a bloc with members of the Internationalist Workers Party (Fourth International) (IWPFI) at the August 1984 convention against a majority dominated by the Communist Party USA.

In 1995, RWL created the Coalition to Defend Affirmative Action, Integration & Immigrant Rights, and Fight for Equality By Any Means Necessary (BAMN), a civil rights organization whose headquarters is in Detroit. BAMN continues to organize high-profile direct actions at UC Berkeley and elsewhere in California.

In 2006, RWL's websites ceased function.

=== 1991 split ===
In 1991, a group of RWL members, including founding member Peter Sollenberger, left to form the Trotskyist League.

== Publications ==
- Down with the Carter-Reagan war drive! Detroit, Mich.: Revolutionary Workers League; San Francisco, Calif.: Socialist League (Democratic-Centralist), 1981
- Socialism and black liberation: a statement by a black revolutionary from the Revolutionary Workers League. Detroit, Mich.: Revolutionary Workers League, 1981
- Theses on pornography: adopted by the fifth national conference of the Revolutionary Workers League/US, 27 May 1985. S.l. : The League, 1985

== See also ==
- American Left
- Socialist Alternative (United States)
- Spartacist League/U.S.
- Democratic Socialists of America
- History of left-wing politics in the United States
