= Jim Cooper (California politician) =

American politician

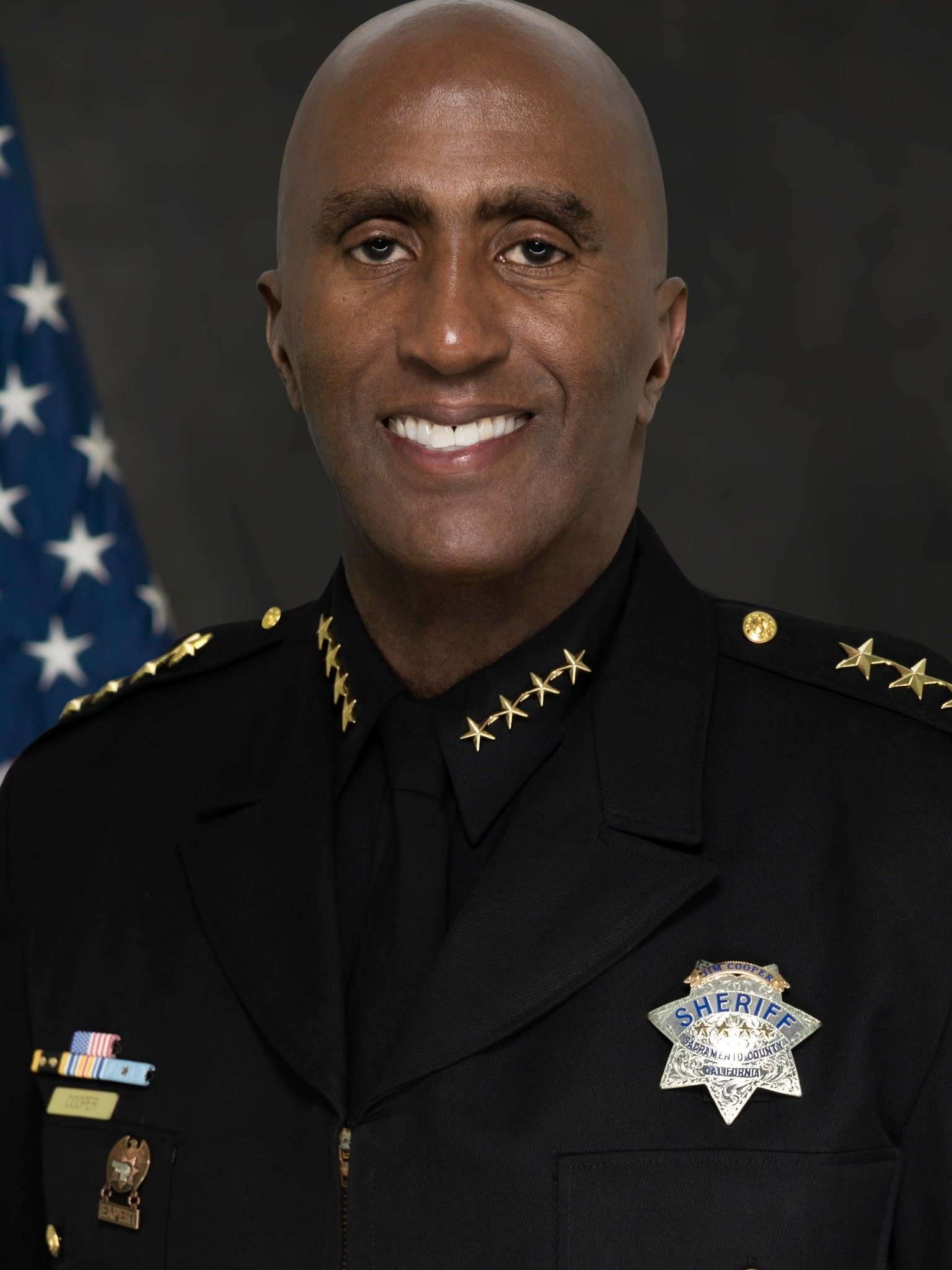
- Official portrait, 2023

37th Sheriff of Sacramento County
- Incumbent
- Assumed office December 16, 2022
- Preceded by: Scott Jones

Member of the California State Assembly from the 9th district
- In office December 1, 2014 – December 8, 2022
- Preceded by: Richard Pan
- Succeeded by: Stephanie Nguyen

Personal details
- Born: January 5, 1964 (age 62) Verdun, France
- Party: Democratic
- Education: Saint Mary's College of California (MA)

James Cooper (born January 5, 1964) is the current Sheriff of Sacramento County and politician who served in the California State Assembly. He is a Democrat who represented the 9th Assembly District, which encompassed portions of Sacramento and San Joaquin counties.

Cooper was a member of the California Legislative Black Caucus and Assistant Majority Floor Leader. Prior to being elected to the Assembly in 2014, he was an Elk Grove founding mayor and city councilmember, as well as the Sacramento County sheriff's captain.

== Political positions ==
Cooper has also been described as a "crusader against criminal justice reform". Examples of this include his opposition to Proposition 47 and support for Proposition 20.

Cooper is opposed to fossil fuel divestment and played a key role in halting the progression of SB 1173, a bill that would have forced CalPERS and CalSTRS to divest from most fossil fuel holdings.

== Sacramento County sheriff ==
Cooper unsuccessfully ran for Sheriff of Sacramento County, California in 2010 and lost against Scott Jones. Before running, he had a thirty-year career in various positions at the Sheriff's office.

On March 15, 2022, Cooper announced that he would be a candidate for Sacramento County Sheriff. In the election, he defeated his opponent, undersheriff Jim Barnes with 54.48% of the vote.

== Electoral history ==
California's 9th State Assembly district election, 2014
Primary election
Party	Candidate	Votes	%
Democratic	Jim Cooper	18,923	31.1
Democratic	Darrell Fong	17,752	29.2
Republican	Tim Gorsulowsky	10,938	18.0
Republican	Manuel J. Martin	8,111	13.3
Democratic	Diana Rodriguez-Suruki	5,080	8.4
Total votes		60,804	100.0
General election
Democratic	Jim Cooper	50,188	55.5
Democratic	Darrell Fong	40,220	44.5
Total votes		90,408	100.0
Democratic hold			

California's 9th State Assembly district election, 2016
Primary election
Party	Candidate	Votes	%
Democratic	Jim Cooper (incumbent)	64,879	69.9
Republican	Timothy Scott Gorsulowsky	27,924	30.1
Total votes		92,803	100.0
General election
Democratic	Jim Cooper (incumbent)	109,979	66.8
Republican	Timothy Scott Gorsulowsky	54,729	33.2
Total votes		164,708	100.0
Democratic hold			

California's 9th State Assembly district election, 2018
Primary election
Party	Candidate	Votes	%
Democratic	Jim Cooper (incumbent)	49,675	67.8
Democratic	Harry He	11,927	16.3
Democratic	Mario Garcia	11,643	15.9
Total votes		73,245	100.0
General election
Democratic	Jim Cooper (incumbent)	92,951	68.3
Democratic	Harry He	43,225	31.7
Total votes		136,176	100.0
Democratic hold			

2020 California's 9th State Assembly district election
Primary election
Party	Candidate	Votes	%
Democratic	Jim Cooper (incumbent)	50,609	43.8
Republican	Eric M. Rigard	33,997	29.4
Democratic	Tracie Stafford	27,974	24.2
Democratic	Mushtaq A. Tahirkheli	3,015	2.6
Total votes		115,595	100.0
General election
Democratic	Jim Cooper (incumbent)	142,088	65.8
Republican	Eric M. Rigard	73,742	34.2
Total votes		215,830	100.0
Democratic hold			

Sacramento County Sheriff
Party	Candidate	Votes	%
Nonpartisan	Jim Cooper	168,374	54.5
Nonpartisan	Jim Barnes	140,803	45.5
Total votes		309,177	100.0
