= Cora Woodbridge =

California woman politician (1862-1948)

Cora Woodbridge (September 1862-1948) was a civic leader and state legislator in California. In 1922 she became the first woman legislator chosen from the Ninth Assembly District. She was a Republican.

Cora May Utte was born in Sacramento County. She married Dr. Bradford Woodbridge in Stockton. They had a daughter who sang opera.

Woodridge led various civil projects. She was president of the Women's Improvement Club, which she founded in 1910. Woodbridge was elected to the California Assembly in 1922, 1924, and 1926.

== See also ==
- Enoch Woodbridge
- Florence P. Kahn
- Eleanor Miller
