= Carlos Petroni =

Argentine political activist and writer

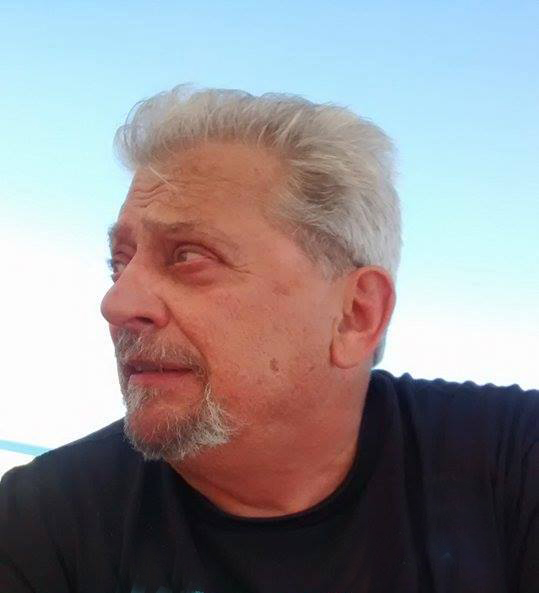
- Born: August 8, 1947; Buenos Aires, Argentina
- Died: April 13, 2025 (aged 77)
- Writing career
- Pen name: Leon Perez, Nicholas Kramer, and Simon Morales
- Website: Izquierda.info

Carlos Petroni (August 8, 1947 – April 13, 2025) was an Argentine political activist, and writer.

== Biography ==
Petroni was a leader of the Morenoist tendency of Latin American Trotskyism from 1973 to 1988 and was a close collaborator of the founder of this movement, Nahuel Moreno. Petroni contributed to, edited or published more than 30 political newspapers, magazines and websites around the world and is the author of half a dozen books on politics, Marxist theory and political organizing. He is also known at times by some of his pen names: Leon Perez, Nicholas Kramer, and Simon Morales.

Petroni was a founder of and/or leading participant in numerous Trotskyist groups in Latin America, Europe and the United States, he had extensive organizing skills and experience in working class struggles. Petroni was a member and leader of the Argentine Partido Socialista de los Trabajadores (PST) from 1973 to 1976, and during the beginning of the military dictatorship was part of its underground continuation. As an elected leader of unions representing printers, metal workers, meatpackers, social workers and others, he led strikes, organized unions and support, ran for public office and was involved in various working class struggles for almost four decades.

Petroni went into exile in 1978. From 1978 to 1985 he was responsible for the North, Caribbean and Central American Secretariat of the Morenoist tendency.

He participated in the Nicaraguan and Salvadoran Revolutions in the late 1970s, helped found the Nicaraguan section of the IWL, and helped develop other Central American organizations and the Mexican section of the Morenoists. He was a delegate and member of the Presidium of the Morenoist international tendency in its different stages: Bolshevik Tendency of the Fourth International (1976–1980), Fourth International (International Committee) (1981) and International Workers League (Fourth International)—Liga Internacional de los Trabajadores (Cuarta Internacional or LIT-CI) from 1981 to 1988. After the collapse of the military dictatorship he travelled extensively around the Americas and Europe then became a leader of the Movement for Socialism (Argentina), from 1985-1988.

Prior to that he (as well as Nahuel Moreno) worked as a member of the International Committee of the LIT-CI and its International Secretariat from 1982 until the death of Moreno in 1986. He was also a founding member of its US section, eventually called the Internationalist Workers Party (IWP). He was expelled with the IWP from the LIT-CI in 1988 after Nahuel Moreno's death. Petroni then continued his political work in the USA. In the late 1990s he became a member of the Committee for a Workers' International (CWI) and its affiliate in the USA, Socialist Alternative (US), and after leaving the CWI in 2002, he helped found a group called the Left Party in the USA.

Petroni lived on and off in the US since 1978. He founded SF-Frontlines newspaper in 1997, worked with the Immigrant Rights Movement or Movimiento por los Derechos de los Inmigrantes (MDI), worked on Matt Gonzalez's campaign for mayor in 2003, and was active in the San Francisco elections. For example, he ran for the Board of Supervisors in 1998 obtaining 16,293 votes (2%). In 2001 he ran for City Treasurer and obtained 13% of the votes. In 2000, he wrote and managed Proposition F, considered a historical reparation Act for African American City residents, which obtained more than 45% of the vote. He ran for different offices from the mid-1990s until he returned to Argentina after the 2004 election. He also supported, organized and managed other campaigns and significant local ballot initiatives. Most recently he edited the online and print versions of Izquierda.info.

Petroni died on April 13, 2025 at the age of 77.

== Trial ==
As a result of his trade union and political work in Argentina, he was the target of three assassination attempts during 1974 and 1975 by death squads organized by the Argentine Anticommunist Alliance (Triple A). The Triple A operated under the protection and support of Peronist governments from 1973 to 1976. Many members of the Triple A collaborated with the military dictatorship after 1976.

In 2006, Argentine Judge Norberto Oyarbide ruled the Triple A had committed "crimes against humanity," which meant their crimes were exempt from statutes of limitations. Suspects can be prosecuted for actions committed in the 1970s and early 1980s. Petroni emerged as an official witness in this trial. Petroni introduced into the federal court proceedings motions asking Judge Oyarbide to order the arrest of more than a dozen members, mostly union officials from Mar de Plata, Argentina, of the right wing terrorist organization CNU (which became part of the Triple A) and to question in court the knowledge of their crimes by their associate and present day General Secretary of the CGT, Hugo Moyano, who is now also vice president of the Peronist Justicialist Party.

The 2010 documentary film Parapolicial Negro: Apuntes para una prehistoria de la Triple A features interviews with Petroni about the assassination attempts.
