= 2017 Berkeley protests =

Political protests in Berkeley, California

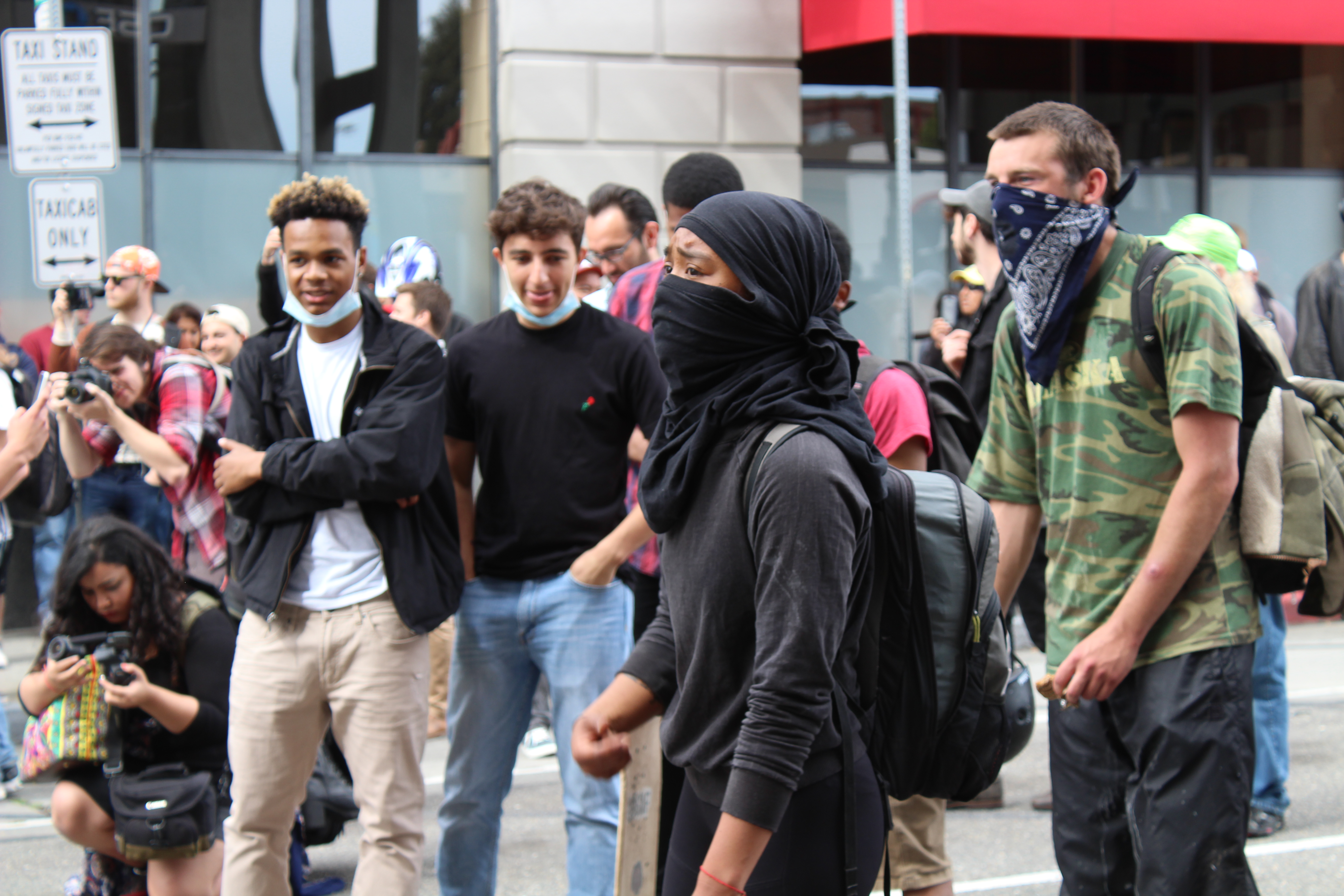
- Protesters of the April 15 pro-Trump rally
- Date: February–September 2017
- Location: Berkeley, California, US
- Caused by: Invitation of Milo Yiannopoulos and other right wing individuals to University of California, Berkeley
- Goals: Banning of right wing individuals from University of California campuses
- Methods: Protests, demonstrations, riots, looting, vandalism, civil disobedience, civil resistance, strike action

Parties
Antifa; Socialists; Anarchists; BAMN; International Socialist Organization; Refuse Fascism	Rise Above Movement; Oath Keepers; Patriot Prayer; Tea Party movement; Identity Evropa; Proud Boys; Latinos for Trump	State of California; Berkeley Police Department; University of California; University of California, Berkeley; University of California Police Department

Casualties
- Injuries: 18
- Arrested: 71+

The 2017 Berkeley protests were a series of protests and clashes between organized groups that occurred in the city of Berkeley, California, in the vicinity of the University of California campus. Violence occurred predominantly between protesters opposed to then-President Donald Trump, including activists such as antifa groups and socialists; and pro-Trump groups such as Republicans, members of the alt-lite and alt-right, neo-Nazis, and white nationalists. Most participants were peaceful.

The first event occurred on February 1, when Trump supporter Milo Yiannopoulos was scheduled to give a speech at the university. Two later incidents on March 4 and April 15, were pro-Trump rallies met by protesters. Another rally occurred on April 27, hosted by Kyle "Based Stickman" Chapman, Brittany Pettibone, Lauren Southern, and others at Martin Luther King Jr. Civic Center Park. This was scheduled after a planned speech by Ann Coulter was canceled. A "Say No to Marxism" rally planned to be held in the same park on August 27 was officially canceled by the organizers in the aftermath of the Unite the Right rally, but still drew both Trump supporters and protesters.

Protests and clashes continued into the month of September, with a campus visit from conservative radio host Ben Shapiro and the return of Yiannopoulos for "Berkeley Free Speech Week". Security for the September events, though "Free Speech Week" was officially canceled by the organizers, cost the university hundreds of thousands of dollars.

== Timeline ==
=== February 1 ===
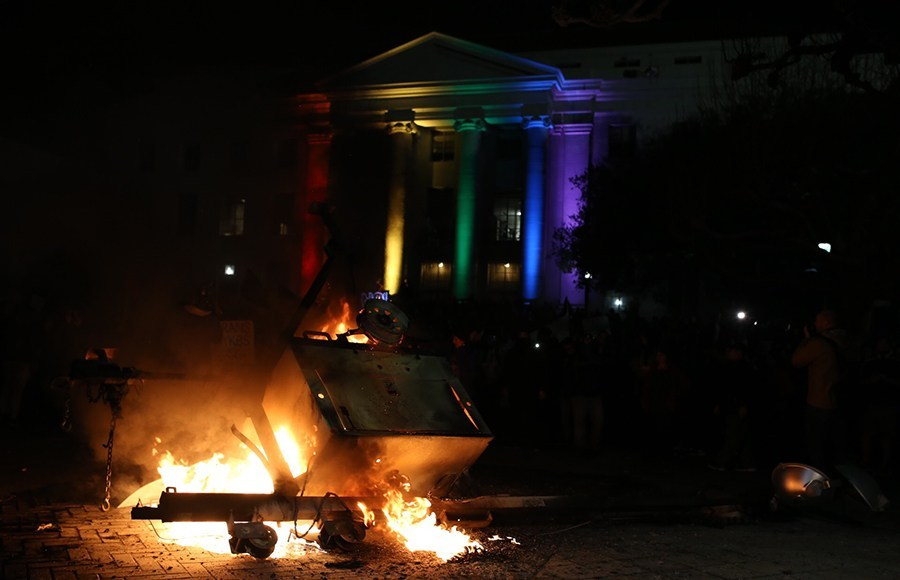
Property damage in Sproul Plaza resulting from the protest

On February 1, Milo Yiannopoulos was scheduled to make a speech at the University of California, Berkeley at 8 p.m. Prior, more than 100 UC Berkeley faculty signed a petition urging the university to cancel the event.

Over 1,500 people gathered on the steps of Sproul Hall to protest the event. The protest had been a non-violent, student gathering until a group of 150 black bloc protesters slowly entered the crowd and interrupted the protest. The interrupting protesters claimed to be antifa activists and members of the left-wing group By Any Means Necessary. The group of interrupting protestors set fires, damaged property, threw fireworks, attacked members of the crowd, and threw rocks at the police. Within twenty minutes of the start of the violence, the Yiannopoulos event was officially canceled by the university police department due to security concerns, and protesters were ordered to disperse. The interrupting protesters continued for several hours afterwards, with some protesters moving into downtown Berkeley to break windows at several banks, a Starbucks, a Target, a Sprint store, and a T-Mobile store. Among those assaulted were a Syrian Muslim, who was pepper sprayed and hit with a rod by an interrupting protester who said "You look like a Nazi", and Kiara Robles, who was pepper sprayed while being interviewed by a TV reporter. One person was arrested for failure to disperse, and there was an estimated $100,000 in damage.

=== March 4 ===
A march in support of then-President Donald Trump in Berkeley on March 4 billed as "March 4 Trump" resulted in seven injuries and ten arrests after confrontations with protesters. Police confiscated several weapons from attendees of the rally, including baseball bats, bricks, metal pipes, pieces of lumber, and a dagger.

=== April 15 ===
On April 15, several groups, including approximately 50 members of the right-wing group Oath Keepers, held a pro-Trump rally and were met by protesters, including antifa activists. Planned speakers included Brittany Pettibone and Lauren Southern. The event was organized as a free speech rally by Rich Black, who also organized the March 4 Trump event.

At Martin Luther King Jr. Civic Center Park a "large number of fights" broke out, smoke bombs and fireworks were thrown into the melee, and pepper spray was used in the crowd. According to the Los Angeles Times, "Both groups threw rocks and sticks at each other and used a large trash bin as a battering ram as the crowd moved around the perimeter of the park." Eleven people were injured, six of whom were hospitalized, including one person who was stabbed. Police "seized a handful of cans of peppers [sic] spray, some knives, and dozens of sign and flag poles, skateboards, and other blunt objects" from members of the crowd. Twenty people were arrested.

A Reuters reporter estimated that between 500 and 1,000 people were in the park at the peak of the rally. Various far-right activists in the crowd held up antisemitic signs, and some made Nazi salutes and used Nazi symbolism such as the Black Sun The Rise Above Movement (RAM) also attended and some of their members were arrested.

During the event, Nathan Damigo—a 30-year-old California State University, Stanislaus student and the founder of the white supremacist, alt-right group Identity Evropa punched a female protester in the face and then ran into the crowd. The attack was captured on video and prompted calls for Damigo's arrest or expulsion. Cal State Stanislaus stated that they would investigate Damigo.

Also during the event, a man covering his face with a bandanna attacked three rally attendees with a bike lock, hitting one of them on the head and causing "significant injuries". He was later identified by 4chan's /pol/ users as a former Diablo Valley College professor, named Eric Clanton, and subsequently arrested on three counts of assault with a deadly weapon, and ultimately sentenced to probation after pleading no contest to all charges.

=== April 27 ===
On April 18, 2017, administrators at UC Berkeley canceled a planned April 27 appearance on the campus by conservative columnist Ann Coulter, citing safety concerns. Coulter tweeted on April 19 that she would be coming to Berkeley to speak on that date regardless. On April 20, the University stated that they would host Coulter on May 2 at a "protected venue" that would be disclosed at a later date. Coulter declined to reschedule, noting that she was unavailable on May 2 and that UC Berkeley had no classes scheduled for that week, and said she would hold her speech on April 27 with or without the university's consent. She later said that she did not intend to speak, but said she might attend the April 27 event. Right-wing activist Brittany Pettibone delivered remarks promising that conservatives will refuse to stand down, which was met with applause from the crowd. Vice and Proud Boys co-founder Gavin McInnes read Ann Coulter's planned speech at the event. Other speakers at the rally included the conservative-libertarian writer Lauren Southern. There was concern the gathering would turn violent based on "social media feeds of militant left-wing and right-wing activists abuzz with plans to proceed with demonstrations over the Coulter-Berkeley controversy."

The International Socialist Organization organized an "Alt-Right Delete" rally at Sproul Plaza. About 150 people attended the rally and 70 police officers monitored the situation. Several hundred attended a "Freedom of Speech" rally at the Martin Luther King Jr. Civic Center Park in Berkeley. The demonstrations were relatively peaceful; however, there was some tension as five were arrested, one for a weapons violation and another for drug possession.

=== August 27 ===
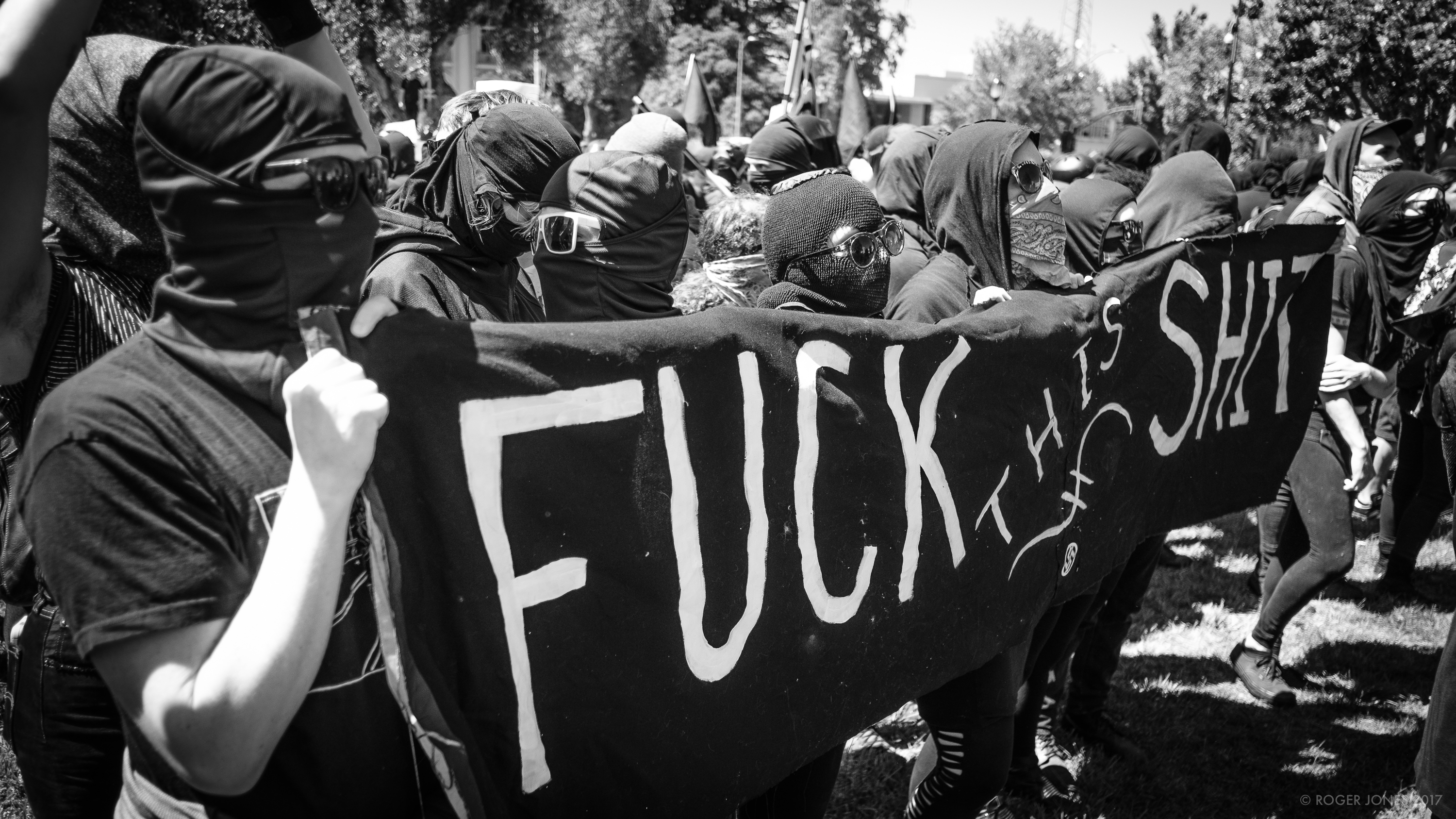
Anti-fascist black block rally at Berkeley protests

Between 2,000 and 4,000 people attended a "Rally Against Hate" protest against a far-right "Say No to Marxism" rally scheduled for Martin Luther King Civic Center Park in Berkeley on August 27. The protest was part of a larger nationwide backlash against far-right movements in the aftermath of a deadly white supremacist rally in Charlottesville, Virginia, earlier that month. The "Say No to Marxism" rally was cancelled due to safety concerns and only a small number of anti-Marxist protestors attended. Scheduled attendees at the far-right rally included Augustus Invictus, Jack Posobiec, and Kyle Chapman (none of whom attended), Johnny Benitez, organizer of an "America First" rally in Laguna Beach, and Irma Hinojosa of Latinos for Trump. The rally followed a largely peaceful protest held the day before in nearby San Francisco, in response to a rally that was organized then later cancelled by Patriot Prayer.

The Berkeley protest drew supporters mostly from area labor unions, churches, and liberal activist groups, as well as antifa activists. Five hundred police officers were present. Police banned weapons and projectiles, and set up a barricade of dump trucks to protect the crowd from vehicles.

The protest was initially peaceful until about 100 masked black-clad anti-fascists carrying shields and sticks broke through police lines, bypassing security checks. The Berkeley police chief had ordered his officers to abandon the park, arguing that confronting the antifa activists would have led to more violence. The masked protesters targeted the small number of right-wing activists attending the announced rally, in some cases pepper-spraying and chasing them away, or beating them.

African American journalist Al Letson of Reveal, who was covering the event, saw five masked protesters beating an unarmed man with sticks. Fearing for the man's life, Letson used his body as a human shield and encouraged the protesters to discontinue their attacks. Joey Gibson of Patriot Prayer, also present at this rally, was escorted out by the police after being attacked, and Hinojosa and others required police escorts to exit safely. Anti-fascists threatened to break the cameras of journalists who recorded them. Afterwards, the demonstrators marched to the nearby Ohlone Park where they dispersed. Thirteen people were arrested on various charges, including assault with a deadly weapon and felony assault. One officer and six other people were injured with two taken to local hospitals for treatment.

=== September ===
Berkeley Mayor Jesse Arreguin asked UC Berkeley in August 2017 to cancel conservatives' speech plans slated for September 24–27 in prevention of violent civil unrest. In September 2017, Cal Chancellor Carol Christ said: "Call toxic speech out for what it is, don't shout it down, for in shouting it down, you collude in the narrative that universities are not open to all speech. Respond to hate speech with more speech"; and, president of the University of California system, Janet Napolitano, said: "I think some of these speakers are coming deliberately to provoke ... a response. But nonetheless they're coming to speak, they're coming to put forward controversial and noxious ideas. Colleges and universities are places where noxious ideas are expressed. So how you ... protect that value, that's the challenge that we face."

==== September 14 ====
On September 14, conservative radio host Ben Shapiro gave a speech at the campus, which was covered by a crew for the political documentary No Safe Spaces. No one wearing masks or with weapons was allowed on campus, and the Berkeley City Council authorized the police to use pepper spray, a weapon that had been banned in the city for twenty years. The campus also set up concrete barriers and metal detectors, with a UC spokesman stating that about $600,000 was spent on security for Shapiro's speech. Hundreds gathered off campus at a "Refuse Fascism" rally to protest the event. Police made nine arrests; there was no major violence.

==== September 24–27 ====
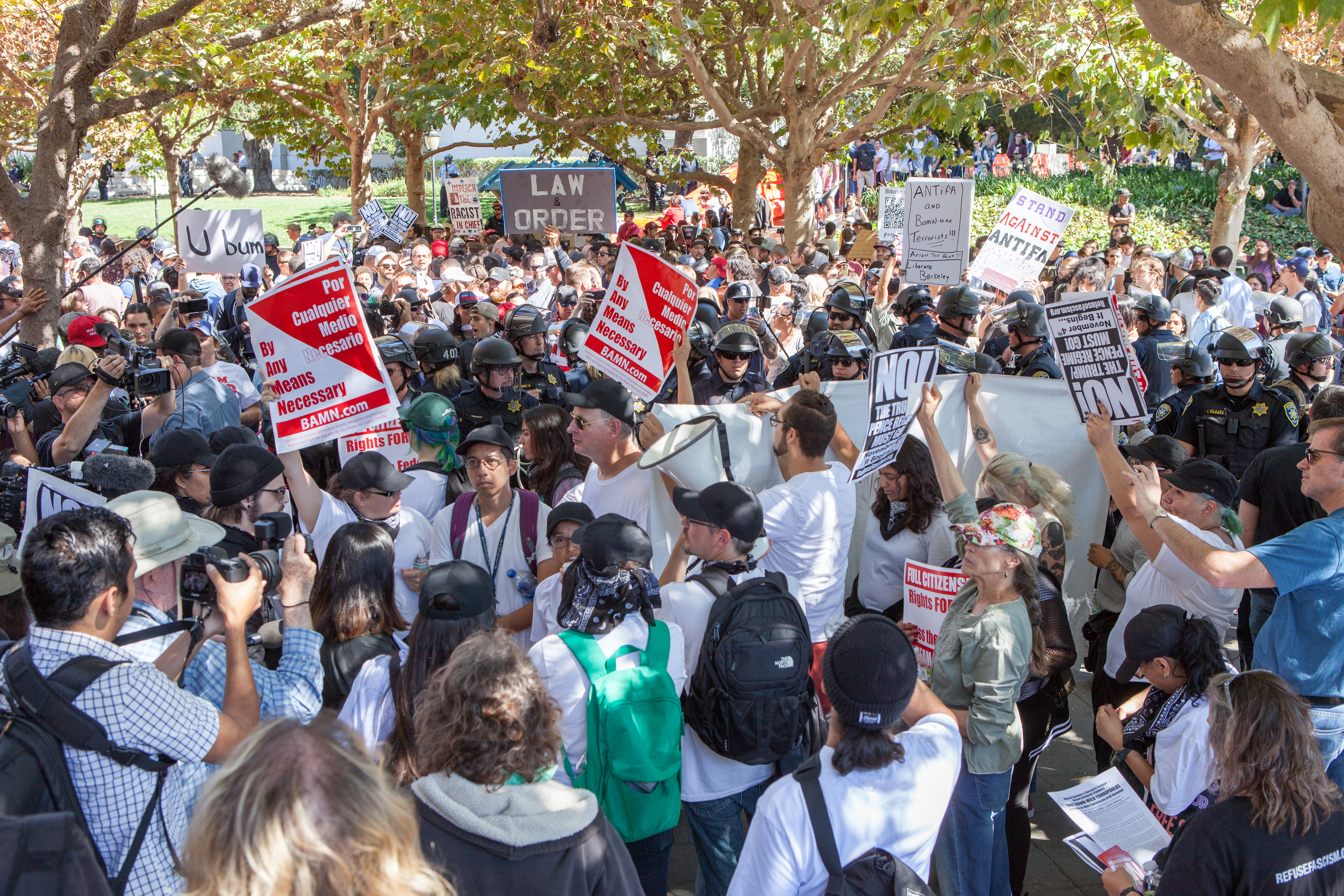
Protesters and police officers fill Sproul Plaza on September 24, 2017

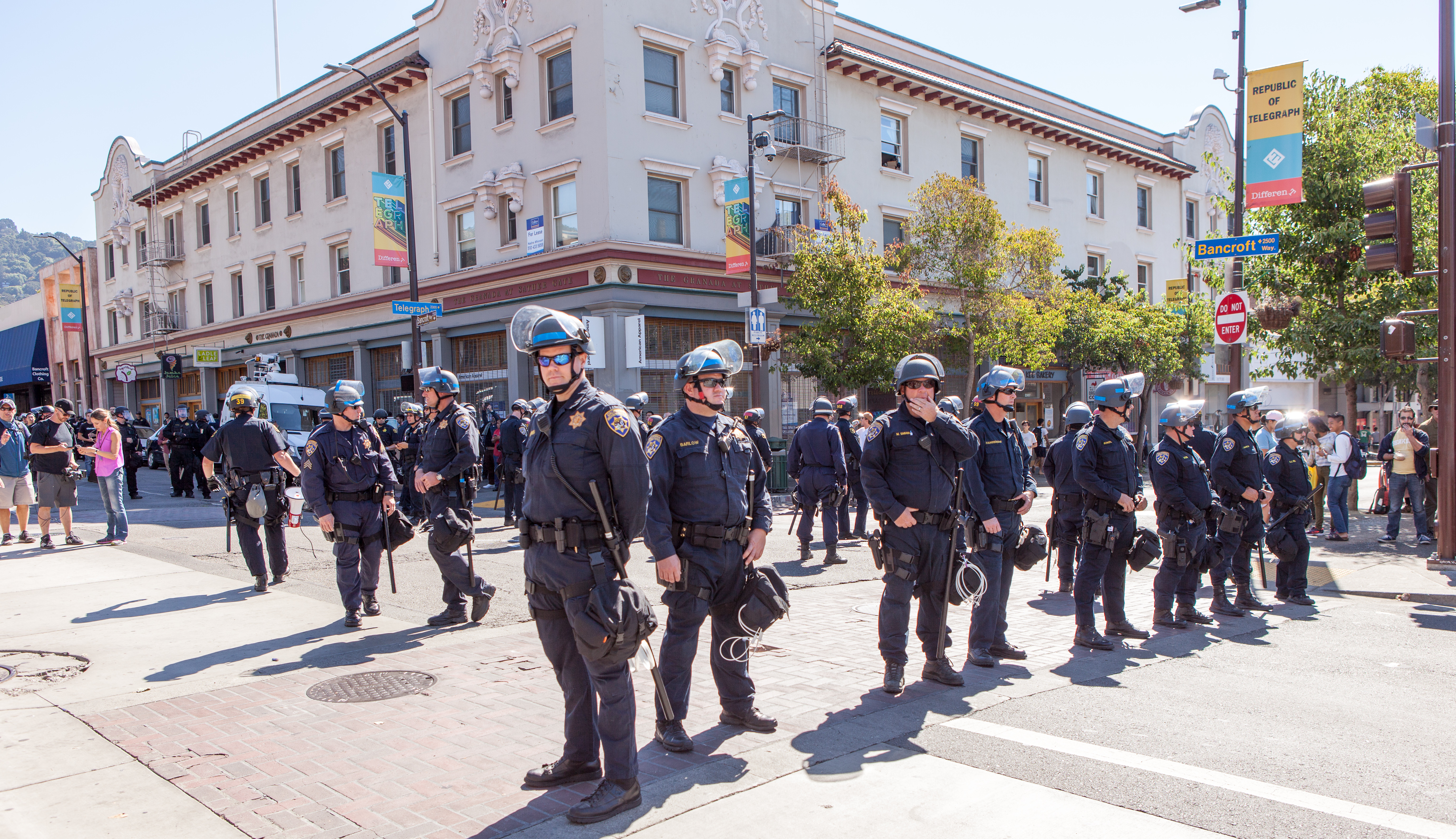
Police wearing riot helmets fill the intersection of Bancroft and Telegraph

A dozen commentators with right-wing political leanings, including Milo Yiannopoulos, Steve Bannon, Ann Coulter, Pamela Geller, David Horowitz, and Erik Prince, were extended invitations by the UC Berkeley student group Berkeley Patriot to participate in what it terms "Free Speech Week" in Berkeley September 24–27. Nearly two hundred professors and graduate students signed the open letter "Boycott the Alt-Right @UCBerkeley" calling for a boycott of campus for the four days of the planned events to ensure community members' "physical and mental safety". A UC Berkeley spokesman stated that the cost of security for Free Speech Week will exceed $1 million.

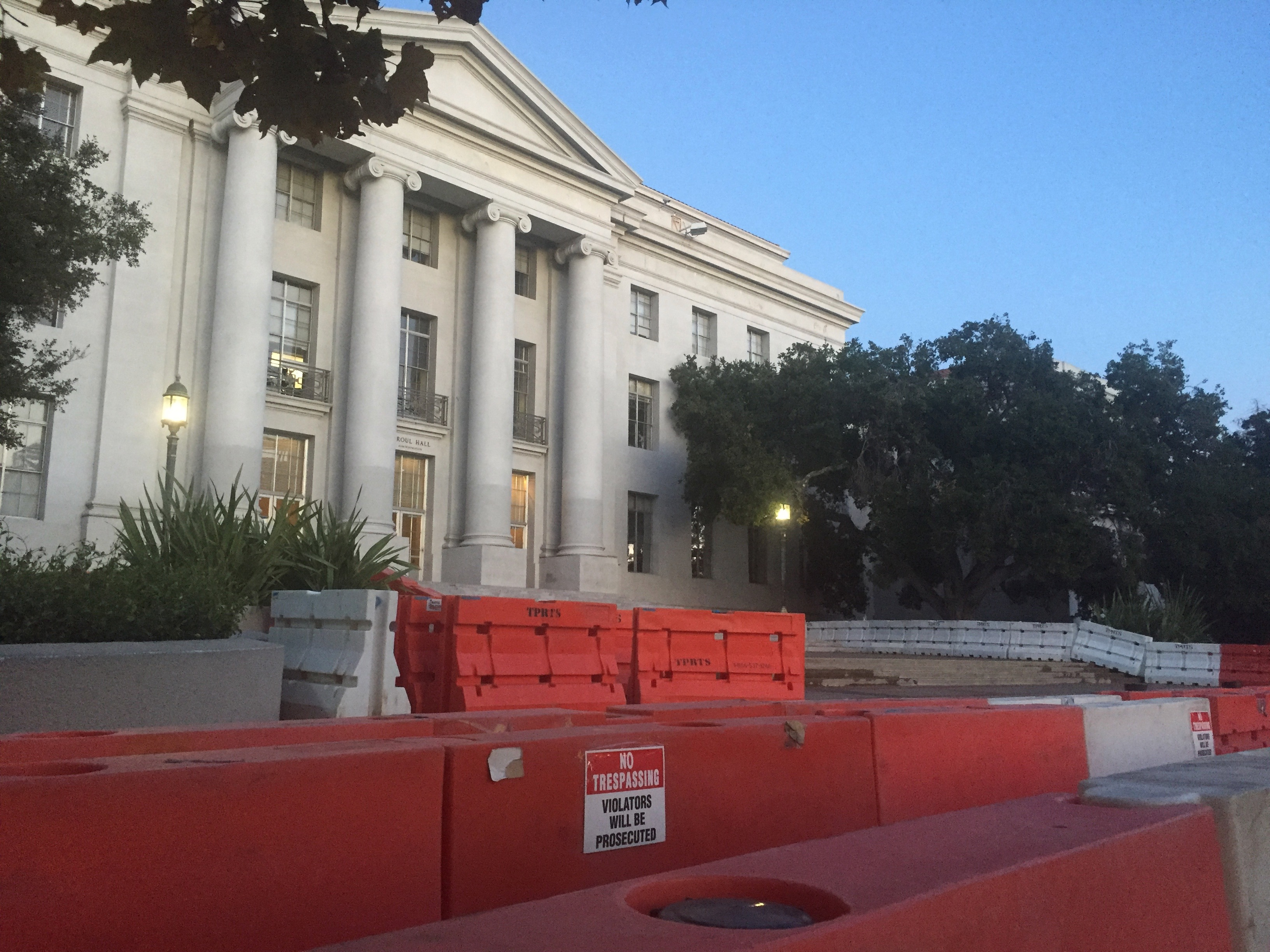
Sproul locked down during Free Speech Week

Prior to the slated event, some students members of Berkeley Patriot filed a complaint with to the US Department of Justice alleging, among other things, that the university had "arbitrary and irrational bureaucratic hurdles on student groups which seek to exercise their First Amendment rights by holding public debates."

Having not signed contracts with various invitees for them to appear and having already backed out of its only reserved, indoor venues, on September 23, Berkeley Patriot officially notified the campus that they were canceling all Free Speech Week activities. Milo Yiannopoulos stated that afternoon that he and other speakers would still come to campus and hold a "March for Free Speech" at noon on Sunday. About 300 protesters, including former US Army soldier Chelsea Manning, participated in a peaceful march to the campus on Saturday.

On September 24, Yiannopoulos, Cernovich and Geller arrived outside Sproul Hall and Yiannopoulos spoke very briefly without a sound system and sang the US national anthem. Hundreds of protesters and supporters surrounded the police barricades that were erected that morning around Sproul Plaza. Attendees were permitted into the plaza only after passing through a single metal detector; approximately 150 people saw Yiannopoulos speak, while hundreds more waited in line. An "unprecedented" number of police officers were brought in, costing the university an estimated $800,000. Police banned weapons and face masks. Afterward, anti-Trump protesters, mocking Yiannopoulos's speech, chanted, "Immigrants are here to stay, Milo had to run away." Berkeley police reported at least 11 arrests, but no injuries or damage to buildings.

UC Berkeley spokesman Dan Mogulof said afterwards that the media event amounted to "the most expensive photo op in the university's history."

On September 25, protesters holding a rally against white supremacy demonstrated at Wheeler Hall on the Berkeley campus. One person was arrested for wearing a mask to conceal his identity.

On September 26, fights broke out near Sproul Plaza between right-wing and left-wing groups, including Patriot Prayer and By Any Means Necessary (BAMN). The groups fought inside an "empathy tent" and then began marching to People's Park, where Kyle "Stickman" Chapman and others from Patriot Prayer spoke about a war on whites and a "battle for Berkeley". Police made three arrests, among them BAMN spokeswoman Yvette Felarca.

== Aftermath ==
Following the February 1 protest, a lawyer representing a local police union criticized the police administration for their "hands off" policy which prevented officers from preventing crime or making arrests. A police representative responded that they did not want to further escalate violence, and that the campus police were inexperienced in dealing with black bloc tactics. According to Berkeley Police chief Margo Bennett, they were waiting for reinforcements to come from Oakland Police and the Alameda County Sheriff before dispersing the crowds.

Following the February events, Trump criticized UC Berkeley on Twitter, asserting that it "does not allow free speech" and threatening to de-fund the university.

After the April events, several news organizations noted that the fighting demonstrated an increasing use of violence between members of both the far right and the far left.

On June 6, 2017, Larry Klayman filed a lawsuit on the behalf of Robles, who alleges the university and others violated her First Amendment rights when she was attacked with pepper spray while being interviewed. In July 2017, Robles voluntarily dismissed her lawsuit.

After the August events, Jesse Arreguin, the mayor of Berkeley, suggested classifying the city's antifa as a gang. The US House Minority Leader and Californian congressperson Nancy Pelosi condemned the violence allegedly perpetrated by antifa protesters, writing that "the perpetrators should be arrested and prosecuted."

In January 2018, four people who were attacked while trying to attend a speech due to be given by Yiannopoulos filed a federal civil-rights lawsuit against the University of California, Berkeley. The lawsuit alleged that campus and city officials failed to prepare for the rioting despite sufficient warning, and as a result would-be attendees were left vulnerable to assault by left-wing protest groups.
