= Sacramento County Sheriff's Office =

Law enforcement agency in California

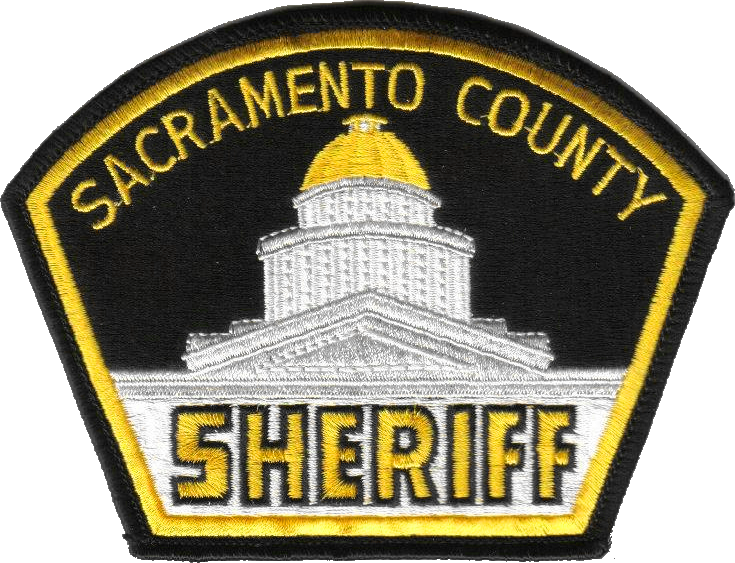
- Patch of the Sacramento County Sheriff's Department

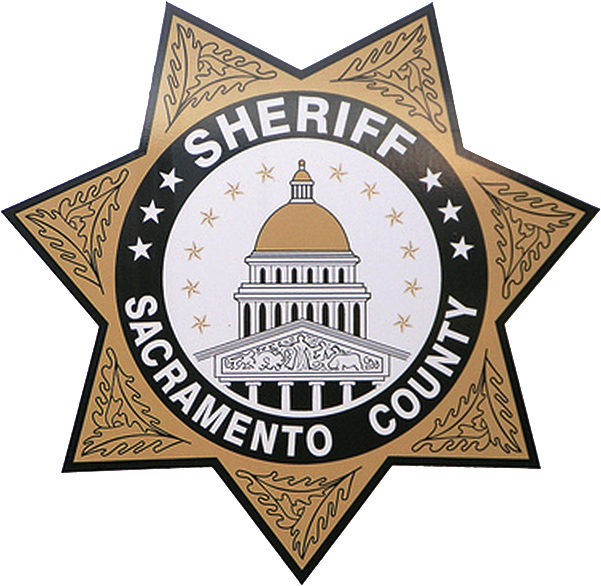
- Seal of the Sacramento County Sheriff's Office
- Abbreviation: SSO
- Motto: "Service with Concern!"

Agency overview
- Formed: 1850; 176 years ago
- Annual budget: $403 million (2011-2012)

Jurisdictional structure
- Operations jurisdiction: Sacramento, California, U.S.
- Jurisdiction of Sacramento County Sheriff's Department
- Area: 995 square miles (2,580 km^{2})
- Population: 2,000,000
- General nature: Local civilian police

Operational structure
- Headquarters: Sacramento, California
- Agency executive: Jim Cooper, Sheriff

Facilities
- Stations: 6
- Jails: 2
- Helicopters: 4

Website
- Official website

The Sacramento County Sheriff's Office (SSO), is a local law enforcement agency that serves Sacramento County, California. It provides general-service law enforcement to unincorporated areas of Sacramento County, as well as incorporated cities within the county that have contracted with the agency for law-enforcement services. Currently only Rancho Cordova and Isleton have such a contract with the department since the Citrus Heights and Elk Grove Police Departments assumed all police authority and responsibility for their communities in 2006. It also holds primary jurisdiction over facilities operated by Sacramento County, such as local parks, marinas, and government buildings; provide marshal service for the Sacramento County Superior Court; operate the Sacramento County Jail and the Rio Cosumnes Correctional Center in Elk Grove; and provide services such as laboratories and academy training to other law-enforcement agencies within and nearby Sacramento County. The county sheriff is currently Jim Cooper.

== Weapons ==
The Sacramento Sheriff's Office currently issues versions of the 9mm Glock. Deputies also have less lethal items that are issued to them including but not limited to an X26 taser, expandable baton, and OC spray.

== Organization ==
=== Correctional Services ===
==== Main Jail ====
The Main Jail provides custodial and security services for incarcerated and detained individuals for the Sacramento County Sheriff's Office and other outside agencies. In doing so, the Main Jail is responsible for the health, safety, care and welfare of those individuals housed in the facility, as well as for the safety of those sworn and civilian employees who provide services within the Main Jail Division.

==== Rio Cosumnes Correctional Center ====
The Rio Cosumnes Correctional Center (RCCC) is the primary custody facility for inmates sentenced to County Jail from the Sacramento County Courts. An increasing percentage of the inmates are pre-sentence detainees housed at RCCC to keep the population at the Main Jail below the limit set by Federal decree. In addition, the Correctional Center houses inmates en route to other jurisdictions, federal prisoners under a contract with the U.S. Bureau of Prisons, and reciprocal prisoners from other counties. RCCC is the primary reception point for parole violators who are being held pending revocation hearings and the central transportation point for all defendants sentenced to State Prison. Classified as a Type II facility, RCCC accepts newly arrested persons booked by law enforcement agencies in the south part of Sacramento County. A staff of over 180 Sheriff's Office employees provides supervision to all inmates to ensure they live in a safe, secure and healthy environment. Several support services activities augment the custody staff and provide needed services and programs for inmate housing.

==== Work Release ====
The Work Release Division is Sacramento County's alternative to incarceration or in lieu of the payment of certain traffic fines for those convicted of a criminal or traffic offense in Sacramento County.

Our Work Project and Home Detention programs allow qualified inmates to serve their criminal sentence at their own home on the electronically monitored Home Detention Program, or by participating in community service projects on Sheriff’s Work Project. The Alternative Sentencing Program allows those who are referred directly by the Traffic Court to perform community service hours in lieu of court imposed fines or criminal sentences.

Since 1979, these programs have provided a more constructive and beneficial way for low-risk offenders to serve their court-ordered commitments. Participation has typically ranged from 500-800 active inmates on Work Project and our Home Detention program averages approximately 250 enrolled inmates. The Alternative Sentencing Program, on average, has 1100 active participants.

As alternatives to incarceration, Home Detention and Sheriff’s Work Project allow inmates to maintain employment and family relationships and continue to be productive members of society. The community benefits from inmate labor provided to groups such as school and park districts, churches, civic groups, and other non-profit organizations. The County of Sacramento benefits from a reduced jail population, helping to alleviate potential jail overcrowding, as well as the reduction of associated incarceration costs.

Alternative Sentencing Program participants benefit the entire community by completing many tasks for local nonprofit and public organizations (including but not limited to) veteran’s assistance programs, homeless assistance organizations, and community food banks.

Alternative Sentencing Program
Child Support Revenue Recovery Detail
Home Detention
Power Program
Sheriff's Work Project
Toy Project

=== Contract and Regional Services ===
==== Airport ====
Source:

==== Civil Bureau ====
The Civil Bureau serves Civil process in the manner prescribed by law. Civil process includes summons and complaints, small claims documents for a civil lawsuit, restraining orders, bench warrants, evictions and any other notice or order from the courts. The bureau also levies on wages, bank accounts, vehicles or any asset of the judgment debtor.

==== Court Security ====
The Court Security Division insures the safety and security of the court buildings and of the people who appear and work in them. Court Security facilitates and maximizes the efficiency of all judicial and other courthouse functions. The Court Security Division also delivers all in-custody defendants to and from the courthouse in a safe and secure manner.

==== Security Services ====
Security Services include Parking Enforcement Detail which enforces laws, codes, and ordinances that protect the rights of the disabled, ensures that public roadways and parking facilities are open and accessible to vehicles, pedestrians, and emergency equipment and improves the quality of life for citizens by identifying and taking action to correct unsafe conditions and ensuring the orderly flow of traffic.

=== Field and Investigations Services ===
==== Central Division ====
Central Division provides law enforcement services for the unincorporated areas of South Sacramento, the Delta and Galt as well as Rancho Murieta, Herald, Wilton, Walnut Grove and the City of Isleton.

==== Centralized Investigations ====
Source:

==== East Division ====
East Division comprises Rancho Cordova, Rosemont, Gold River, Lincoln Village, Mather, Butterfield-Riviera East.

Rancho Cordova Police Department

==== Impact Division ====
Hi-Tech Crimes Task Force

The Sacramento Valley Hi-Tech Crimes Task Force is part of the Centralized Investigations Division of the Sacramento Sheriff's Office. First organized in the mid-1990's, the Task Force currently comprises more than 60 local, state, and federal law enforcement agencies. The Task Force consists of non-sworn personnel and full-time investigators from the Sacramento County Sheriff’s Office, California Highway Patrol, Sacramento Police Department, San Joaquin County Sheriff and Sacramento County Probation. In addition to numerous affiliate agencies throughout the Central Valley and Northern California work with the Task Force on a part time basis. Investigators are cross designated as United States Marshals and are Task Force Officers (TFOs) with the Federal Bureau of Investigation's Child Exploitation Task Force.

The Hi-Tech Crimes Task Force consists of three specialty teams: Identity Theft, Internet Crimes Against Children (ICAC) and Hi-Tech Crimes. Identity Theft Detectives conduct investigations of crimes which involve the theft and fraudulent use of a victim’s personal identifying information. Internet Crimes Against Children (ICAC) detectives work to protect children from sexual predators by investigating crimes involving child exploitation on the internet and pursue those involved with child pornography. Hi-Tech Crimes Detectives investigate other cyber related crimes such as the unauthorized access to computer systems.

In addition to the investigative teams, Task Force members also conduct forensic examinations of computers, cell phones and various other types of digital media seized in investigations of other crimes, such as homicide, upon request by detectives from other bureaus or affiliate agencies. Task Force members also assist outside agencies with training in the abovementioned areas.

==== North Division ====
The North Division provides law enforcement services to the northern portion of Sacramento County, and serves the following communities: Antelope, Arden-Arcade, Carmichael, Elverta, Fair Oaks, Foothill Farms, McClellan Park, North Highlands, Rio Linda, and Orangevale.

==== Off-Duty Program ====
The Off-Duty Program is administered by the Sacramento Sheriff's Office. It allows citizens and businesses to hire deputy sheriffs for law enforcement services. Officers wear their sheriff's uniform and must abide by the practices, policies, and procedures of the Sacramento Sheriff's Office.

==== Volunteer Services ====
Sheriff's Amateur Radio Program (SHARP)

The Sheriff's Amateur Radio Program (SHARP) is a 501(c)(3) non-profit formed in 1977 in response to a rash of theft crimes and heightened citizen participation in the apprehension of the East Area Rapist. SHARP is composed of volunteer amateur radio operators who are licensed by the Federal Communications Commission (FCC).

The members of SHARP have the responsibility of assisting the Sacramento County Emergency Operations Center with any emergency requiring auxiliary communication. Emergencies include extended power outages, flooding, and other types of disasters that disable land based power supplies where amateur radio specialists can continue to operate.

Sacramento County Sheriff's Explorers

The Sacramento County Sheriff's Office Explorer Program is for teenagers and young adults, 14–20 years of age. The program is a well rounded P.O.S.T. approved curriculum that prepares the Explorers for a future in law enforcement and other community service-based careers. Explorers receive hands-on training in self-defense tactics, arrest, search and seizure laws, and other Law Enforcement related subjects. Additional life building skills, such as public speaking, resume building, grooming standards, work ethic, and teamwork complete the curriculum.

Explorers perform community services in the greater Sacramento area such as traffic control, security, decoy operations, and fingerprinting.

This program provides youth, interested in a career in Law Enforcement, the opportunity to work side-by-side with Sacramento County Sheriff's Deputies. These deputies work in a variety of assignments including patrol, corrections, traffic, Problem Oriented Policing, and Crime Scene Investigation.

Using the skills they are taught, they are able to successfully compete against other Explorer Programs throughout the state.

Volunteer Reserve Officer

The Sacramento County Sheriff's Office has a Volunteer Reserve Force of approximately 164 reserve officers, Level III through Level I. Working alongside regular officers, reserve officers can participate in warrant sweeps, DUI checkpoints, prisoner transportation, boating and water safety programs, academy training, firearms training and other related activities.

Volunteers in Partnership with the Sheriff (V.I.P.S.)

Since 1993, the Sacramento County Sheriff's Office is proud to have a volunteer work force that helps foster the partnership between the Sheriff's Office and the community in working toward improving the quality of life for the residents of Sacramento County.

Search and Rescue

The Sheriff's Search and Rescue Unit was started in 1992 and consists of all volunteer members who are registered Disaster Services Workers with the State Office of Emergency Services. The unit has over 50 qualified members that are trained in search management techniques including foot, equestrian, and canine searches. The canine teams are qualified in trailing, tracking, water, and cadaver search.

Unit members are trained in urban, suburban, and rural searches for missing persons. They are also available for evidence and article searches and large animal rescue. The unit plays a regional mutual-aid role in assisting search and rescue efforts with outside jurisdictions. The members are equipped to respond 24 hours a day 7 days a week to department needs.

=== Support Services ===
==== Field Support ====
Communications Bureau - The Communications Bureau is a Public Safety Answering Point (PSAP) for the unincorporated areas of Sacramento County and the City of Rancho Cordova. All 911, 7-digit emergency and non-emergency telephone calls to the Sacramento County Sheriff’s Office from the unincorporated areas of Sacramento County, and the City of Rancho Cordova, are routed to the Communications Bureau.

Live Scan Unit - The Live Scan unit assists the public with fingerprinting for criminal background checks required for employment, licensing, or securing a position that places them in a position of trust. Applicants needing Live Scan services must provide an acceptable primary form of photo identification. Those include a current and valid: California driver’s license, California Department of Motor Vehicles (DMV) identification card, or out-of-state driver’s license.

Property Warehouse - Custodians for all safekeeping, found and evidentiary items booked by Sacramento Sheriff's Office, sends all unclaimed cleared property to PropertyRoom.com

Records and Warrants - provides crucial information to both internal and external customers.

==== Internal Affairs ====
Source:

=== Leadership ===
==== Command Staff ====
Source:

==== Media and Public Affairs ====
Source:

== Training ==
Professional Standards Division

Emergency Vehicle Operations Course (EVOC)
Employee Relations
Fair Employment
Training and Education Division

Academy
Emergency Vehicle Operations Course (EVOC)
Firearms Training Unit

Kenneth Royal Firearms Range

In-Service Training

Internal Affairs
Legal Affairs
Pre-Employment
Recruiting

== History ==
The first elected sheriff of Sacramento County was Joseph McKinney. In 1850, McKinney and his deputies were involved in a series of confrontations with Gold Rush-era squatters around the city of Sacramento. On August 15, 1850, Sheriff McKinney, who narrowly escaped the barrage of bullets the day before, rounded up twenty deputies and rode to Brighton, a settlement several miles outside of Sacramento, where squatters had barricaded themselves in a house. As the Sheriff and his deputies entered the house, the Sheriff ordered the armed squatters to lay down their weapons. A volley of gunfire erupted, killing the young sheriff who stood in the foreground of the confrontation.

Sheriff Don Cox approved the formation of a Sheriff's Air Squadron in the late 1930s or early 1940s, prior to the attack on Pearl Harbor. The Squadron was inactive during World War II as a result of restrictions on civil aviation near the California coast. After the war ended, it became active again and began to undertake support activities for the Sheriff's Department, including prisoner transfers and search and rescue activities.

The Sheriff's Department underwent significant changes in the 1970s. In the 1970 Sheriff's election, the Deputy Sheriff's Association voiced support for challenger Duane Lowe against incumbent John Misterly, following disagreements regarding deputies' training and pay. Lowe was elected in a run-off election, and during the next six years oversaw efforts to modernize the Sheriff's Department, extend new services to the community, and improve pay and working conditions for deputies.

The Sheriff's Department's canine detail was created in 1979.

In 1998, Theodore Kaczynski was held by the Sacramento Sheriff's Department on suicide watch during pre-trial interviews to determine his competency to stand trial and act as his own lawyer during criminal proceedings.

In 2001, multiple-murderer Nikolay Soltys, one of the FBI's Ten Most Wanted, was captured by the Sacramento Sheriff's Department following one of the largest manhunts in Sacramento history.

=== 1991 Sacramento hostage crisis ===
The 1991 Sacramento Hostage Crisis occurred on April 4, 1991, when four people took hostages at a Good Guys! Electronics store located at the Florin Mall. The Sacramento County Sheriff's Department Special Enforcement Detail (SED) and Critical Incident Negotiations Team (CINT) handled the incident.

The local media broadcast the crisis during which hostage takers lined up some of the hostages in front of the entrance as human shields. After which a twenty-year-old male hostage was shot in the leg released to deliver the gang's message and plight to the local media. They claimed they were trying to draw attention to the troubles of their home country and that they were on a suicide mission. During the rescue attempt three hostages as well as three of the four hostage-takers were killed and fourteen hostages were injured. The situation was the largest hostage rescue operation in U.S. history, with over 50 hostages being held at gunpoint.

== Fallen officers ==
Since the establishment of the Sacramento County Sheriff's Office, 22 officers have died in the line of duty.

Officer	Date of death	Details
Sheriff Joseph McKinney	Thursday, August 15, 1850	Gunfire
Captain Charles J. Ogle	Monday, February 12, 1951	Automobile accident
Deputy Sheriff William L. Littlejohn	Friday, June 3, 1955	Vehicular assault
Deputy Sheriff Roger L. Bauman	Tuesday, December 12, 1961	Gunfire
Deputy Sheriff Kenneth B. Royal	Friday, June 7, 1968	Gunfire
Corporal Bruce Roger Verhoeven	Tuesday, December 4, 1973	Gunfire
Deputy Sheriff Stewart Porter Baird	Sunday, June 13, 1976	Assault
Christopher W. Boone	Thursday, October 25, 1979	Gunfire
Deputy Sheriff Eugene M. Luther	Friday, April 25, 1980	Gunfire
Detective David E. Miller	Sunday, January 2, 1983	Vehicle pursuit
Sergeant Richard Earl Deffner	Thursday, January 21, 1988	Gunfire
Deputy Sheriff Sandra Lee Larson	Tuesday, December 8, 1998	Automobile accident
Deputy Sheriff Joseph Michael Kievernagel	Wednesday, July 13, 2005	Aircraft accident
Deputy Sheriff Kevin Patrick Blount	Wednesday, July 13, 2005	Aircraft accident
Deputy Sheriff Jeffrey Vaughn Mitchell	Friday, October 27, 2006	Gunfire
Deputy Sheriff Vu Nguyen	Wednesday, December 19, 2007	Gunfire
Deputy Sheriff Paul William Derouen	Saturday, March 29, 2008	Struck by vehicle
Deputy Sheriff Lawrence William Canfield	Wednesday, November 12, 2008	Motorcycle accident
Deputy Sheriff Danny Oliver	Friday, October 24, 2014	Gunfire
Deputy Sheriff Robert French	Wednesday, August 30, 2017	Gunfire
Deputy Sheriff Mark Stasyuk	Monday, September 17, 2018	Gunfire
Deputy Sheriff Adam Gibson	Monday, January 18, 2021	Gunfire

== Misconduct ==
Multiple credible allegations of brutality, abuse, mismanagement, and cover-ups by deputies and leadership have been levelled against the department under the supervision of multiple department heads, including current Sheriff Jim Cooper, previous Sheriff Scott Jones, and many at the Sacramento County Jail while under the supervision of then Undersheriff John McGinness and then Officer Jim Cooper in his previous position with the department. The Sacramento Bee has documented many such cases in its Watchdog Reports.

=== Marshall Miles ===
On October 27, 2019 Marshall Miles was found unresponsive on the floor minutes after he was hogtied while he was being booked and then left facedown, with his wrists still tied to his ankles behind him, on the floor of a Sacramento County Jail cell.

Sacramento Sheriff Scott Jones refused to release video from the jail for months, finally doing so after ongoing public pressure. It showed that Miles had struggled with the officers who subdued him, shouting "I can't breathe". He died on November 1.

The coroner listed his official cause of death as “complications of cardiopulmonary arrest during restraint and mixed drug intoxication,” noting the presence of narcotics in his system and blunt force injuries to his body.

Miles was arrested for erratic behavior, including jumping on cars, and resisting arrest.

=== Mykel McIntyre ===
On May 8, 2017, Sacramento County Sheriff's deputies shot at McIntyre 28 times, hitting him with 7 bullets, after he threw rocks at an officer and a police dog. Three hours earlier, they had responded to his mother's call for help with a mental health check for her son. McIntyre suffered from mental illness, and was in crisis at the time of his killing.

The Inspector Generals report found the killing to be legal because 8 armed officers and the canine were in credible danger from the otherwise unarmed man.

Ellis' family claimed they shot him while he was running away. Sheriff Scott Jones refused to release body or camera footage to the family or the public, and had a notoriously hostile relationship with the Inspector General.

=== Ryan Ellis ===
On May 5, 2017 Ryan Ellis died in the hospital under deputy's custody due to injuries suffered while being arrested for a parole violation the day before. While detained in a police vehicle, Ellis kicked out a back window of the moving vehicle. The deputy driving the vehicle did not stop the car for over half a mile, when Ellis went through the open window.

The Inspector General reported that the deputies had not fastened Ellis' seatbelt nor turned on the in- car camera - two violations of department policy for which they received written reprimands - but determined that Ellis had jumped out of the window as opposed to being thrown from the vehicle, partially because methamphetamine was present in his system.

=== Adriene Ludd ===
On October 11, 2015, Adriene Ludd was shot 13 times, including while lying on the ground, by Sacramento County deputies after fleeing in his vehicle during a traffic stop for expired registration tags on his car. Deputies claimed Ludd had a weapon that he pointed at the deputies, instigating a shootout. They recovered an Intratec Tec-22 semi-automatic pistol with a clear plastic high-capacity magazine at the scene. Ludd's family disputed that he owned any guns, however, the county Inspector General cleared three deputies of misconduct charges, citing that the dash cam footage showed Ludd aiming the gun at the deputies therefore they were in legitimate fear for their lives.

Black Lives Matter staged a peaceful protest after Sheriff Scott Jones declined to release dashcam and body-camera footage or the coroner’s report, citing the ongoing investigation.

=== Branden Johnson ===
On October 29, 2005, Branden Johnson was arrested on suspicion of drunk driving and taken to Sacramento County Jail. He told the Sacramento Bee that during his incarceration, "deputies beat him when he was shackled hand and foot, repeatedly slamming him to the ground." The department denied the allegations and provided an 11-minute video clip from Johnson's 14-hour incarceration, showing Johnson allegedly banging his head against the wall. Johnson stated that he'd like to see the whole video but Undersheriff John McGinness, in charge of operations at the jail, declined to immediately provide the rest of the footage.

=== Don Anthony Antoine ===
On June 19, 2004, Don Antoine was arrested by Sacramento Police officers on charges of assaulting a firefighter, driving under the influence of alcohol, and possession of nunchucks after he ran his car off the Arden-Garden Connector in the Gardenland neighborhood of Sacramento and started a fight with firefighters who responded to the accident. He accused deputies of using excessive force when he says they kicked, punched, beat, and choked him while shackling him to the floor grate in a Sacramento County Jail cell, an event that the deputies deny even took place. On April 16, 2008, a federal grand jury awarded Antoine $170,000 after they found the deputies acted maliciously when they beat him, and one of the jurors was quoted saying the deputies "chained him to a grate like a dog."

=== Jafar Afshar ===
On June 7, 2003, ex-Marine Jafar Afshar was arrested for public intoxication, charges that were dropped the next morning. During booking, his handcuffs were taken off and he was immediately thrown to the ground, splitting his head open and leaving a pool of blood on the floor. A year later, Afshar filed a federal lawsuit (Afshar v. County of Sacramento) alleging violations of 42 U.S.C. § 1983. The only officer named in the lawsuit, Officer Spaid, said in his incident report that Afshar "swung toward him." Afshar received two sets of videotape, the first showing no incident and the second with missing video, which Afshar's attorney called a cover-up.

=== Mihaita Constantin ===
Mihaita Constantin, a 33-year-old Romanian immigrant, was arrested on July 14, 2003, on suspicion of drunk driving. While in one of the holding cells, he refused to sit. Five deputies rushed in, handcuffed Constantin, and scuffled with him for well over 5 minutes, putting a towel over his head. Constantin was left semi-conscious, towel still over his head, with a broken hand, fractured nose, and severe bruises; no officers were injured. On June 29, 2004, Constantin filed a federal lawsuit against the department alleging violations of his civil rights; he was later found dead in a crashed car on a mountain slope near Blue Canyon. His wife has returned to Europe but is continuing the lawsuit.

=== Darryl O'Brien ===
In 2002, 52-year-old Darryl O'Brien, a woman with no previous criminal record, was "dropped," fracturing her knee. After her handcuffs were removed, her arm was yanked so hard behind her back that her shoulder was fractured. Her claim against the county was later settled for $7,500.

=== Michael Hay ===
On December 22, 2000, Sacramento State student Michael Hay was drunk in his apartment when Sheriff's Deputy Rebecca Eubanks came to his apartment about loud music. Hay stated he would keep it down and told Eubanks "You know, you're kind of cute." Eubanks left the apartment. Within a few minutes, Sheriff's Deputy Robert Book arrived at the apartment door. Book said Hay was belligerent toward him and interfered with him finding out what was going on, so Book "handcuffed him and walked him downstairs." Book and Eubanks arrested him for being drunk in public; the charges were later dropped and Book was reprimanded because his "arrest of Michael Hay was without legal authority." While Hay was being booked at the Sacramento County Jail, staff made repeated comments about what his stay was going to be like. Eubanks said, "We're really, really bored and we need somebody to play with, so you're it, OK?" Later the staff nurse warned him that "they like to hurt people around here" and an unidentified officer made a shadow-boxing motion. When Hay was searched, Deputy Santos Ramos and another deputy twisted both arms with such force that Hay's right arm broke. After spending the night with a broken arm and no medical attention, he was released and sought medical care three days later. In 2002, Hay settled a lawsuit against the department for $147,500. Deputies at the jail were counseled for failing to report the injury, but not the injury itself.

=== Troy Zwierzynski ===
In 1999, Troy Zwierzynski had surrendered himself at the jail to complete a work project as part of a misdemeanor sentence. While in a holding cell, he said, he heard a man screaming and turned to look. A deputy ordered Zwierzynski to look away, and "slammed him against the wall violently twisting back his wrists and arms," the complaint states. "The deputies asked (him) if he was going to look the next time. ... Plaintiff, in tears, responded that he would not look again." His wrist was broken, and he later received a settlement of $35,000.

=== Judson King ===
In 1998, a deputy at the jail ordered Judson King to move faster, to which he replied, "I am." King claimed that his elbow was immediately fractured, and later received a settlement of $35,000.

== See also ==
- List of law enforcement agencies in California
- 1991 Sacramento hostage crisis
