= Kevin Johnson (basketball player) =

American basketball player and politician (born 1966)

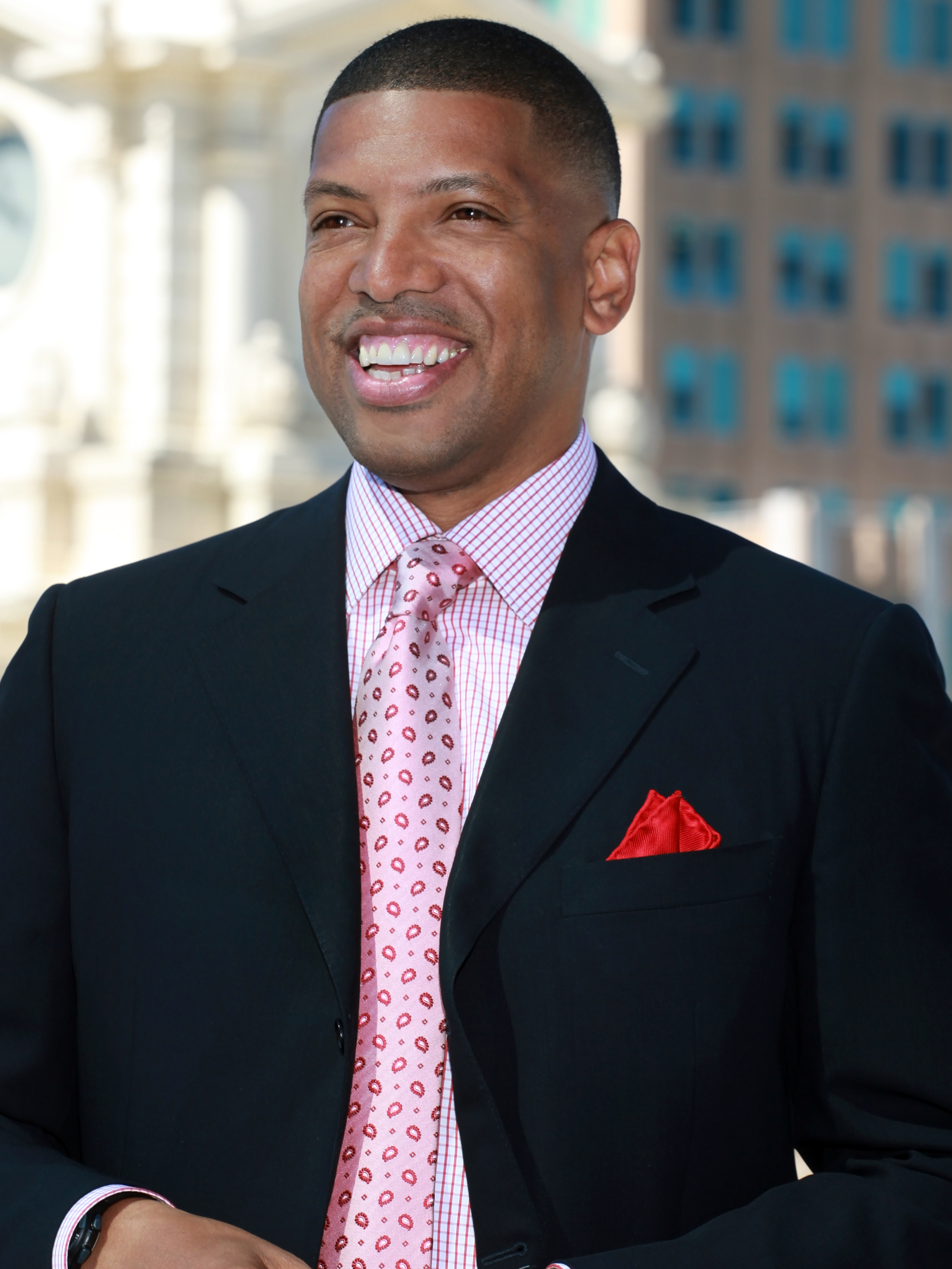

55th Mayor of Sacramento
- In office December 2, 2008 – December 13, 2016
- Preceded by: Heather Fargo
- Succeeded by: Darrell Steinberg

72nd President of the United States Conference of Mayors
- In office 2014–2015
- Preceded by: Scott Smith
- Succeeded by: Stephanie Rawlings-Blake

Personal details
- Born: Kevin Maurice Johnson; March 4, 1966 (age 60) Sacramento, California, U.S.
- Party: Democratic
- Spouse: Michelle Rhee (m. 2011)
- Education: University of California, Berkeley (BA)
- Basketball career

Personal information
- Listed height: 6 ft 1 in (1.85 m)
- Listed weight: 190 lb (86 kg)

Career information
- High school: Sacramento (Sacramento, California)
- College: California (1983–1987)
- NBA draft: 1987: 1st round, 7th overall pick
- Drafted by: Cleveland Cavaliers
- Playing career: 1987–1998, 2000
- Position: Point guard
- Number: 11, 7

Career history
- 1987–1988: Cleveland Cavaliers
- 1988–1998; 2000: Phoenix Suns

Career highlights
- 3× NBA All-Star (1990, 1991, 1994); 4× All-NBA Second Team (1989–1991, 1994); All-NBA Third Team (1992); NBA Most Improved Player (1989); No. 7 retired by Phoenix Suns; 2× First-team All-Pac-10 (1986, 1987); No. 11 retired by California Golden Bears

Career NBA statistics
- Points: 13,127 (17.9 ppg)
- Assists: 6,711 (9.1 apg)
- Steals: 1,082 (1.5 spg)
- Stats at NBA.com
- Stats at Basketball Reference
Medals
Men's basketball
Representing United States
FIBA World Championship
Gold medal – first place	1994 Canada	Team competition

Kevin Maurice Johnson (born March 4, 1966), also known by his initials KJ, is an American former professional basketball player and politician who served as the 55th mayor of Sacramento, California, from 2008 to 2016. Before entering politics, he played 12 seasons in the National Basketball Association (NBA), primarily with the Phoenix Suns.

Johnson played college basketball at the University of California, Berkeley, where he was named a two-time All-Pac-10 Conference player and an honorable-mention All-American by the Associated Press. A point guard, he was selected by the Cleveland Cavaliers in the first round of the 1987 NBA draft as the seventh overall pick. Before the end of his first season, Johnson was traded to Phoenix. During his 11-year tenure with the Suns, Johnson was a five-time All-NBA Team selection, a three-time NBA All-Star, and helped lead the team to the 1993 NBA Finals. Johnson initially retired from the NBA following the 1997–98 season, but returned in 2000 to play several games for the Suns during their playoff run before retiring again. The Suns retired his number 7 on March 7, 2001.

Following his initial retirement, Johnson earned a B.A. in political science from U.C. Berkeley. A member of the Democratic Party, he founded St. HOPE in 1989 and has been active in education reform. He was elected mayor of Sacramento in 2008 and reelected in 2012, becoming the first African American to serve as mayor of Sacramento. As mayor, Johnson launched two education initiatives: Stand UP and Sacramento READS!, to benefit students in Sacramento. Johnson also helped to deter the Sacramento Kings basketball team from moving to Anaheim, and, later, to Seattle, Washington.

== Early life ==
Johnson, the son of Georgia West and Lawrence Johnson, was born March 4, 1966, in Sacramento. After his father died in a boating accident when he was three, Johnson was raised by his grandparents, the Peat family. He attended Sacramento High School, where he starred in both baseball and basketball. In his senior year, Johnson led the state of California in scoring (32.5 ppg) and was named the Northern California Player of the Year.

== College career ==
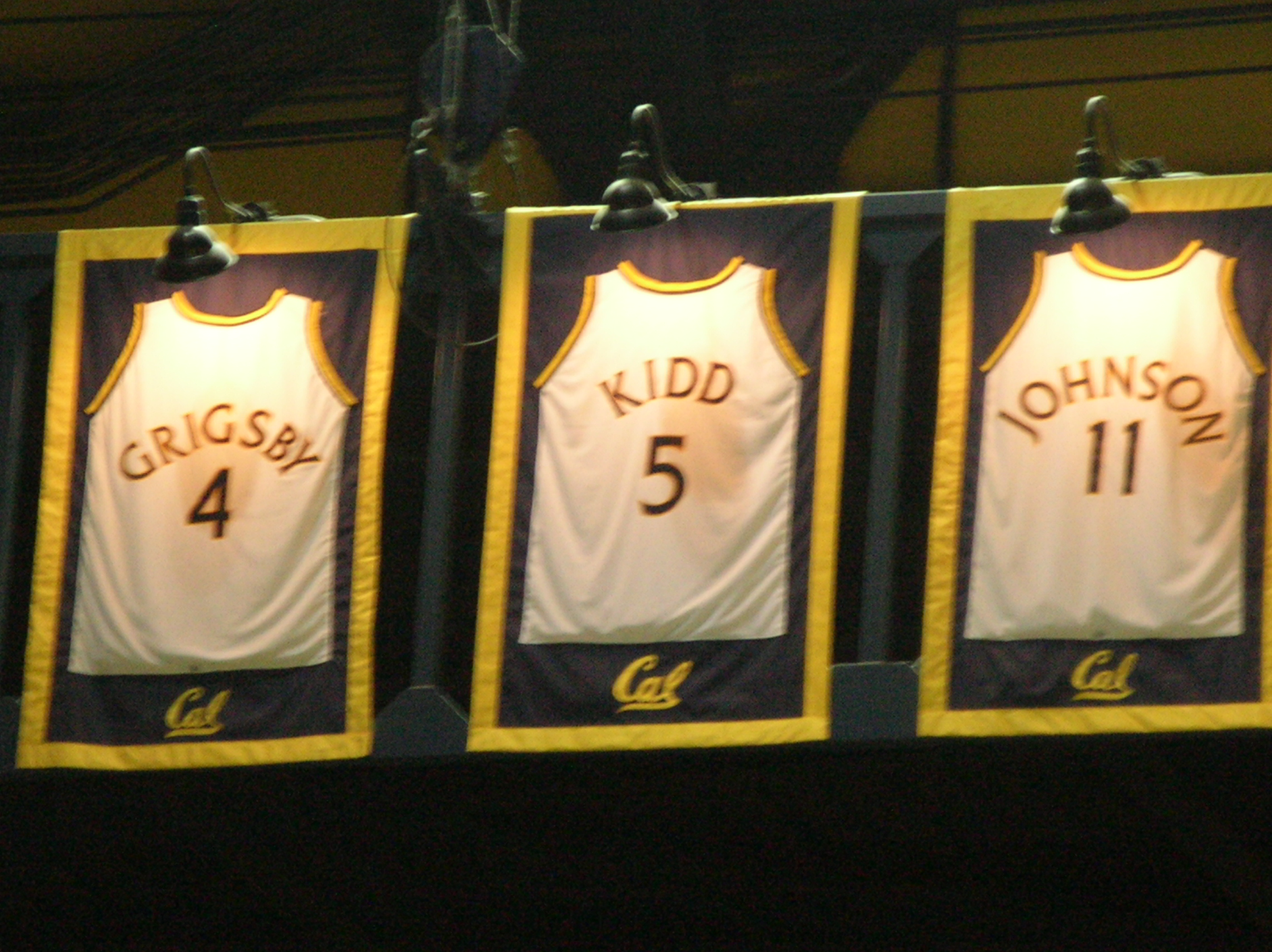
Johnson's jersey (No. 11) is retired by California Golden Bears in 1992.

Johnson accepted a scholarship to play basketball for the University of California, Berkeley. As a four-year starter, Johnson ended his college career in 1987 as the school's all-time leader in assists (since eclipsed by Jason Kidd), steals, and scoring (since eclipsed by Lamond Murray, Sean Lampley, Patrick Christopher, Joe Shipp and Jerome Randle). Johnson was named to the Pac-10's All-Conference First Team in his junior and senior seasons, averaging 17.2 points and 5 assists in his final year. He led Cal to the program's first post-season appearances in 26 seasons with NIT bids in 1986 and 1987 and was the first player in the Pac-10 Conference to post a triple-double. In 1992, Johnson became the first Golden Bear to have his jersey (No. 11) retired.

Johnson briefly played for Cal's baseball team and the Oakland Athletics drafted him as a shortstop in the 23rd round of the 1986 MLB draft. After playing a couple games with Oakland's minor-league team in Modesto, California during the summer of 1986, Johnson ended his baseball career, finding the road to professional baseball more arduous and risky compared to basketball.

== Professional career ==
=== Cleveland Cavaliers (1987–1988) ===
Following his senior season of college basketball, the Cleveland Cavaliers selected Johnson with the seventh pick in the 1987 NBA draft. Originally drafted by Cleveland to challenge the incumbent point guard Mark Price for the starting spot, Johnson found himself playing limited minutes as Price's backup during the 1987–88 NBA season.

=== Phoenix Suns (1988–2000) ===
==== Early years (1988–1990) ====
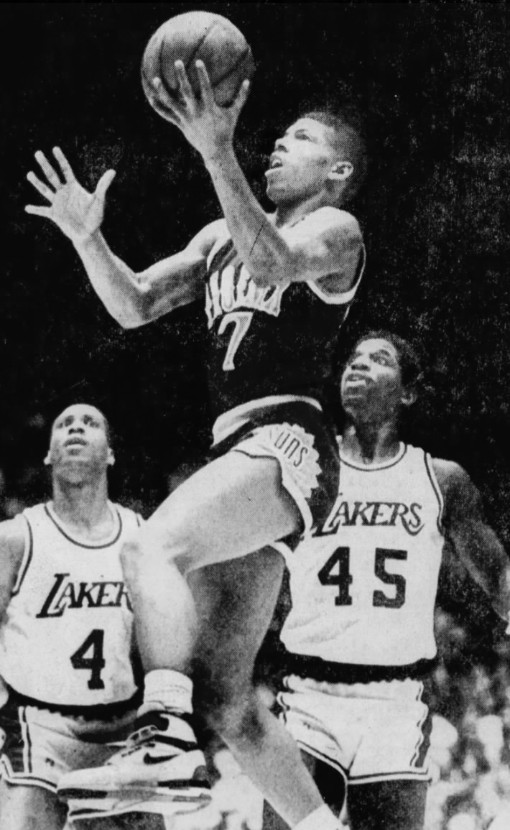
Johnson beats Byron Scott and A. C. Green to the ball on December 6, 1988

On February 28, 1988, Johnson, Mark West, Tyrone Corbin, and a future draft pick were traded to the Phoenix Suns in exchange for forward Larry Nance, Mike Sanders, and a future draft pick. Adjusting quickly to the change of scenery and much-increased playing time, Johnson excelled and the league named him the NBA Rookie of the Month for April 1988 as he averaged 15.1 points, an 86.4% free throw percentage, 10.6 assists, and 5.6 rebounds.

In his first full season with Phoenix, Johnson grew into one of the game's elite players, averaging 20.4 points, 12.2 assists, a 50.5% field goal percentage, and an 88.2% free-throw percentage. With those numbers, Johnson joined Magic Johnson and Isiah Thomas as the only players in NBA history to average at least 20 points and 12 assists in a season. His rapid improvement earned him the 1988–89 NBA's Most Improved Player Award. The 1988–89 season was the first of three straight seasons in which Johnson averaged at least 20 points and 10 assists, joining Oscar Robertson and Isiah Thomas as the only players in league history to accomplish that feat. It also represented the beginning of a new era for the previously moribund Suns' franchise. In Johnson's first seven full seasons in Phoenix from 1989 to 1995, the Suns won the most regular season games in the NBA (394, an average of 56 and never fewer than 53), constituting the only club to win at least 50 every year during that span, and they won the second-most playoff games (46), trailing only the Chicago Bulls.

==== All-Star and international competition (1990–1995) ====
Johnson received berths to the NBA All-Star Team in 1990, 1991, and 1994. In the 1991 All-Star Game in Charlotte, Johnson wore number 41 instead of his familiar number 7. NBC announcers Bob Costas and Mike Fratello speculated that the decision represented Johnson's quiet way of honoring teammate Mark West, the Suns' stoic, largely unrecognized center who thanklessly executed the dirty work on the glass and in the paint.

In the 1991 NBA All-Star Game, Johnson started alongside Magic Johnson in the Western Conference backcourt. In anticipation of the game, the Sporting News asked whether Johnson may have surpassed Magic as the best player on the court. The previous spring in the 1990 Western Conference Semifinals, Johnson led the Suns past Magic's league-best, 63-win Los Angeles Lakers, four games to one. Over the last two games, Johnson closed out the series by averaging 33.5 points and a dozen assists as the Suns won both Game Four and Game Five, with Johnson. vastly outplaying Magic Johnson in the fourth quarter of both contests. Indeed, Johnson's clutch performances led Hall of Fame center and NBC commentator Bill Walton to later remark, "Kevin Johnson ... really came to the top of this league in the 1990 playoffs when he waxed Magic Johnson and the Lakers in the early rounds. Kevin Johnson—and the Suns—taking care of business in 1990, four to one over the Lakers ... Kevin Johnson just totally outplaying Magic." Johnson's performance during the 1990 playoffs led the Suns to a second consecutive berth in the Western Conference Finals as Phoenix became the only team to ever defeat John Stockton's Jazz (55 wins) and Magic Johnson's Lakers (63 wins) in the same postseason.

Johnson made the playoffs every year of his career after his rookie season, reversing the fortunes of the perennially losing Phoenix Suns. The 1992–93 Suns, led by Johnson and new teammate Charles Barkley, posted an NBA-best 62–20 record and made it to the NBA Finals, where they lost to the Michael Jordan-led Chicago Bulls four games to two. Johnson averaged 17.8 points and 7.9 assists in the playoffs and established an NBA record for Finals minutes played by logging 62 minutes in Game 3 (a 129–121 triple-OT victory) vs. the Bulls. But even before Johnson played his first regular season game with Charles Barkley, he suffered an undiagnosed sports hernia in October 1992 when he attempted to lift heavy-set rookie teammate Oliver Miller off the ground during warmups before a preseason game. Despite the undiagnosed hernia problems, Johnson continued to thrive in the postseason. In 1994, he averaged 26.6 points and 9.6 assists in the postseason, scoring 38 points three different times in ten games and averaging 11.0 assists in those three contests.

In the summer of 1994, Johnson played with the U.S. national team, otherwise known as Dream Team II, in the 1994 FIBA World Championship, reuniting with old teammate and point guard rival Mark Price to win the gold medal. Johnson led Dream Team II in both total assists (31) and assists per game (3.9), while shooting 47.1% (16–34) from the field and 50.0% (16–32) on two-point field goal attempts. The U.S. head coach, Don Nelson, stated, "I really like having KJ on the court. The thing that stood out is how he sacrificed his scoring to be a distributor of the ball and make his team win. We didn't need his offense on this team. We did need his defense, penetration and assists. He gave us all three."

==== Injuries and initial retirement (1995–1998) ====
In 1995, after an injury-riddled regular season, Johnson returned to form in the postseason. He averaged 24.8 points on 57.3% shooting from the field and 9.3 assists in ten games, including 43 points (18–24 FG) with 9 assists, 6 rebounds, 3 steals, and just 1 turnover in Game Four of the Western Conference Semifinals at Houston and 46 points (21–22 FT) with 10 assists against only 1 turnover in Game Seven. During that series, Johnson sank more three-pointers (5) than he had hit in the entire 1994–95 regular season (4). In game four of the previous year's series with Houston, Johnson completed a remarkable play, driving the baseline and dunking over Rockets' center Hakeem Olajuwon. The shot became an oft-played highlight for the ages and was part of a second consecutive 38-point, 12-assist effort by the point guard.

By the middle of the 1995–96 season, Johnson had suffered a second undiagnosed sports hernia. Primarily due to the groin, hamstring, quadriceps, and other muscle strains stemming from these undiagnosed hernias, Johnson missed 109 regular season games during his four seasons with Barkley from 1992–93 through 1995–96 (although he only missed one playoff game during his entire career). When diligent off-season workouts during the summer of 1996 failed to erase the abdominal and groin pain that had been plaguing Johnson since the middle of the last season, the Suns' doctors finally diagnosed the second hernia just before the start of training camp in the fall of 1996. Then, during surgery to repair the sports hernia, the Phoenix doctors discovered the second, "hidden" hernia that had existed for four years.

After the 1997–98 season, the Suns announced they would not re-sign Johnson in what was called a mutual decision. Thereafter, Johnson turned down several offers from other teams and officially announced his retirement on October 12, 1999.

==== Comeback (2000) ====
In March 2000, Johnson re-signed with the Suns after receiving a call from his former coach and friend Cotton Fitzsimmons to replace the injured Jason Kidd during the playoff run. Johnson played his first game on April 4, scoring 14 points along with four assists, three rebounds, and one steal; the Suns ultimately lost to the Los Angeles Lakers 84–83. Two days later, the Suns were defeated by the Utah Jazz 105–85. The Suns eventually managed to defeat the Sacramento Kings 102–97 on April 9, with Johnson racking up three points and nine assists.

As the Suns entered the 2000 playoffs, they beat the San Antonio Spurs 3–1 in the best-of-five series — the first playoff series since 1995 in which the team advanced beyond the first round. In their first game against the Lakers, Johnson made the team's first two free-throws in the second quarter when the Lakers were already 7 of 8. Despite the return of Kidd, the Suns were defeated by the Lakers 4–1.

=== Final retirement ===
After Phoenix lost in the second round to the Lakers, Johnson retired for the second and final time.

On March 7, 2001, Johnson's No. 7 was retired by the Suns and he was inducted into their Ring of Honor.

== NBA career statistics ==
Legend
GP	Games played	GS	Games started	MPG	Minutes per game
FG%	Field goal percentage	3P%	3-point field goal percentage	FT%	Free throw percentage
RPG	Rebounds per game	APG	Assists per game	SPG	Steals per game
BPG	Blocks per game	PPG	Points per game	**Bold**	Career high

=== Regular season ===
Year	Team	GP	GS	MPG	FG%	3P%	FT%	RPG	APG	SPG	BPG	PPG
1987–88	Cleveland	52	3	20.1	.460	.222	.821	1.4	3.7	1.2	.3	7.3
1987–88	Phoenix	28	25	31.2	.463	.200	.859	**4.3**	8.7	1.5	.3	12.6
1988–89	Phoenix	**81**	**81**	**39.2**	.505	.091	.882	4.2	**12.2**	1.7	.3	20.4
1989–90	Phoenix	74	74	37.6	.499	.195	.838	3.6	11.4	1.3	.2	**22.5**
1990–91	Phoenix	77	76	36.0	.516	.205	.843	3.5	10.1	**2.1**	.1	22.2
1991–92	Phoenix	78	78	37.2	.479	.217	.807	3.7	10.7	1.5	.3	19.7
1992–93	Phoenix	49	47	33.5	.499	.125	.819	2.1	7.8	1.7	**.4**	16.1
1993–94	Phoenix	67	67	36.6	.487	.222	.819	2.5	9.5	1.9	.1	20.0
1994–95	Phoenix	47	35	28.8	.470	.154	.810	2.4	7.7	1.0	**.4**	15.5
1995–96	Phoenix	56	55	35.8	.507	.368	.859	3.9	9.2	1.5	.2	18.7
1996–97	Phoenix	70	70	38.0	.496	.441	.852	3.6	9.3	1.5	.2	20.1
1997–98	Phoenix	50	12	25.8	.447	.154	.871	3.3	4.9	.5	.2	9.5
1999–00	Phoenix	6	0	18.8	**.571**	**1.000**	**1.000**	2.7	4.0	.3	.0	6.7
Career		735	623	34.1	.493	.305	.841	3.3	9.1	1.5	.2	17.9
All-Star		3	1	17.0	.500	–	.333	1.0	4.3	1.3	.3	4.3

=== Playoffs ===
Year	Team	GP	GS	MPG	FG%	3P%	FT%	RPG	APG	SPG	BPG	PPG
1989	Phoenix	12	12	41.2	.495	.300	**.927**	4.3	**12.3**	1.6	.4	23.8
1990	Phoenix	16	16	36.4	.479	.182	.821	3.3	10.6	1.6	.0	21.3
1991	Phoenix	4	4	36.5	.302	.143	.600	3.3	9.8	.5	.3	12.8
1992	Phoenix	8	8	41.9	.484	**.500**	.861	4.1	11.6	1.5	.3	23.6
1993	Phoenix	**23**	**23**	39.7	.480	.000	.795	2.7	7.9	1.5	**.6**	17.8
1994	Phoenix	10	10	**42.7**	.458	.300	.852	3.5	9.6	1.0	.1	**26.6**
1995	Phoenix	10	10	37.1	**.573**	**.500**	.845	4.1	9.3	.9	.4	24.8
1996	Phoenix	4	4	37.8	.474	.250	.824	4.3	10.8	.5	.5	17.3
1997	Phoenix	5	5	41.6	.295	.136	.879	**4.4**	6.0	**2.6**	.0	16.8
1998	Phoenix	4	1	30.5	.548	.250	.667	2.3	4.8	.5	.3	13.8
2000	Phoenix	9	0	14.3	.324	.000	.833	1.4	2.6	.3	.1	3.2
Career		105	93	36.9	.469	.244	.833	3.3	8.9	1.3	.3	19.3

== Off the court ==
=== St. HOPE ===
In 1989, while still an NBA player, Johnson founded St. HOPE (Helping Others Pursue Excellence) as an after-school program for kids in his native Oak Park neighborhood of Sacramento, California. St. HOPE eventually expanded to run as a nonprofit umbrella organization that consisted of three divisions: St. HOPE Academy, St. HOPE Public Schools, and St. HOPE Development Corporation. This encompassed the new vision to be a nonprofit community development corporation whose mission is to "revitalize communities through public education, civic leadership, economic development, and the arts." Johnson served as CEO of St. HOPE until January 2008.

The St. HOPE Development Corporation, founded in 1994, has focused its efforts on Oak Park. The Development Corporation has enabled the renovation of a number of projects including a historic bank building that is now a local U.S. Bank branch, a Victorian house that has been converted to office space, and a 25,000 square foot art gallery and retail complex that includes the Guild Theater and 40 Acres Art Gallery.

St. HOPE Public Schools is a pre-K-through-12th-grade independent charter school system that provides education to nearly 2,000 students in seven small schools. One of the schools St. HOPE impacted was Sacramento High School (colloquially known as Sac High and now the Sacramento Charter High School), where three generations of Johnson's family including him attended. In October 2002, Sac High was at risk of being shut down and restricted into five smaller schools due to low test scores. But by January 2003, Johnson had raised seed money from the Gates Foundation and drafted a petition to reopen Sac High as an independent charter school. On September 2, 2003 Sac High reopened as Sacramento Charter High School, a charter school with 1,450 students. Since St. HOPE's involvement with Sac High, student performance has improved. In 2010 Sac High's API score improved to 719, compared to 610 in 2006. The number of students who completed all courses required for University of California or California State University Admission also rose between those years from 84% to 90.6%.

These improved test scores attracted the attention of a school in New York and St. HOPE eventually expanded into Harlem at the St. HOPE Leadership Academy Charter School which opened in 2008. Since 2007, the decision to expand St. HOPE to New York has been taught as a case study in the Entrepreneurship in Education Reform class at Harvard Business School. Following presentation of the case study, Johnson discusses it over lunch with the Harvard students and faculty. The class works as a feeder program for students to participate in the Mayoral Fellowship Program in Sacramento.

On April 9, 2009, Acting U.S. Attorney Lawrence G. Brown announced that St. HOPE Academy had agreed to pay $423,836.50 over ten years in settlement of allegations that it did not appropriately spend AmeriCorps grants and education awards and did not adequately document spending of grants. The settlement amount represented one half of the $847,673 in AmeriCorps funds received by St. HOPE Academy over three years from 2004 to 2007. Johnson, St. HOPE Academy's founder and former CEO, agreed to pay $72,836.50 of St. HOPE Academy's $73,836.50 initial payment. In settlement, St. HOPE Academy acknowledged not adequately documenting a portion of its AmeriCorps grant expenditures, and the Corporation for National and Community Service terminated its September 24, 2008 suspension of St. HOPE Academy and Johnson from receiving federal funds, ending questions about Sacramento's eligibility to receive federal stimulus funds.

=== Real estate criticism ===
In 2007, The Sacramento Bee investigated Johnson's real estate holdings in the Oak Park neighborhood of Sacramento and found that more than half the properties owned by Johnson and his entities had been cited for various code violations, including fire risk from overgrown vegetation, dead animals, junk and debris on the properties, as well as decaying and fire-damaged buildings. A local group, Oak Park United against Slumlords (OPUS), complained that Johnson was "stopping progress" in the neighborhood by refusing to develop some of its key properties.

== Mayor of Sacramento ==
=== Elections ===
==== 2008 ====
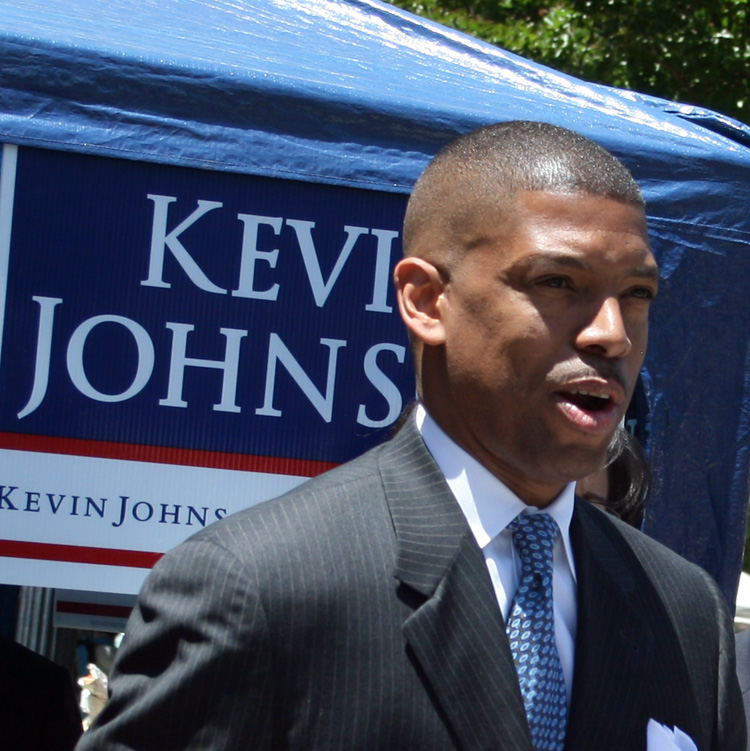
Johnson at a mayoral rally in May 2008

On March 5, 2008, Johnson announced he would run for mayor of Sacramento, his hometown, challenging incumbent Heather Fargo. Election day was June 3, 2008. Since no candidate received a majority of the vote in the nonpartisan election, there was a runoff.

Johnson garnered the endorsement of the Sacramento Police Officers Association (SPOA), the Region Builders, the Chamber of Commerce, Realtors' Association and Labor Council, among others. Johnson was also endorsed by Sacramento City Council members Steve Cohn (Vice Mayor) and Sandy Sheedy, and by former Sacramento Mayor Jimmie Yee.

On June 4, 2008, Johnson, who led by 8 percentage points, forced a runoff election for mayor versus the two-term incumbent. 374 of 378 precincts were reported, and Johnson was ahead of Mayor Heather Fargo 47% to 40%. Five other candidates split the rest of the vote. The candidates needed more than 50% to win the election. Third place finisher Leonard Padilla endorsed Mayor Fargo on June 4, 2008. Johnson, by late May, loaned his campaign $500,000 and raised $490,000, while Fargo raised $340,000 despite having started fundraising in 2005.

Candidate	Votes	Outcome
Kevin Johnson	32,160 (46.58%)	Runoff
Heather Fargo	27,472 (39.36%)	Runoff
Leonard Padilla	4,231 (6.06%)	Defeated
Shawn D. Eldredge	2,462 (3.53%)	Defeated
Muriel Strand	2,104 (3.01%)	Defeated
Richard Jones	679 (0.97%)	Defeated
Adam Daniel	407 (0.58%)	Defeated
Write-in	280 (0.40%)	Defeated

Johnson and Fargo had a runoff election in November, won by Johnson.

Candidate	Votes	Outcome
Kevin Johnson	92,288 (57.4%)	Winner
Heather Fargo	67,348 (41.9%)	Defeated

==== 2012 ====
Johnson announced he would run for reelection for Mayor of Sacramento on September 14, 2011. Election day was June 5, 2012. Johnson was challenged by three individuals: Jonathan Michael Rewers, Leonard Padilla, and Richard Jones. Since Johnson received a majority of the vote (more than 50% of the vote), no run-off was required. Johnson raised at least $841,394 in his reelection bid and spent $500,000 of that on the race.

Johnson was endorsed by Sacramento City Council members Angelique Ashby (Vice Mayor), Steve Cohn, and Jay Schenirer. Johnson also received support from the Sacramento Police Officers Association, the Sacramento Area Firefighters Local 522, and the Sacramento Metro Chamber along with California Senate pro Tem President Darrell Steinberg, Governor Jerry Brown, and Senator Dianne Feinstein.

Candidate	Votes	Outcome
Kevin Johnson	40,823 (58.74%)	Winner
Jonathan Michael Rewers	16,551 (23.81%)	Defeated
J. Leonard Padilla	8,989 (12.93%)	Defeated
Richard L. Jones	2,679 (3.85%)	Defeated
Write-in	459 (0.66%)	Defeated

Johnson defeated the three other candidates with 58.74% of the votes.

=== Tenure ===
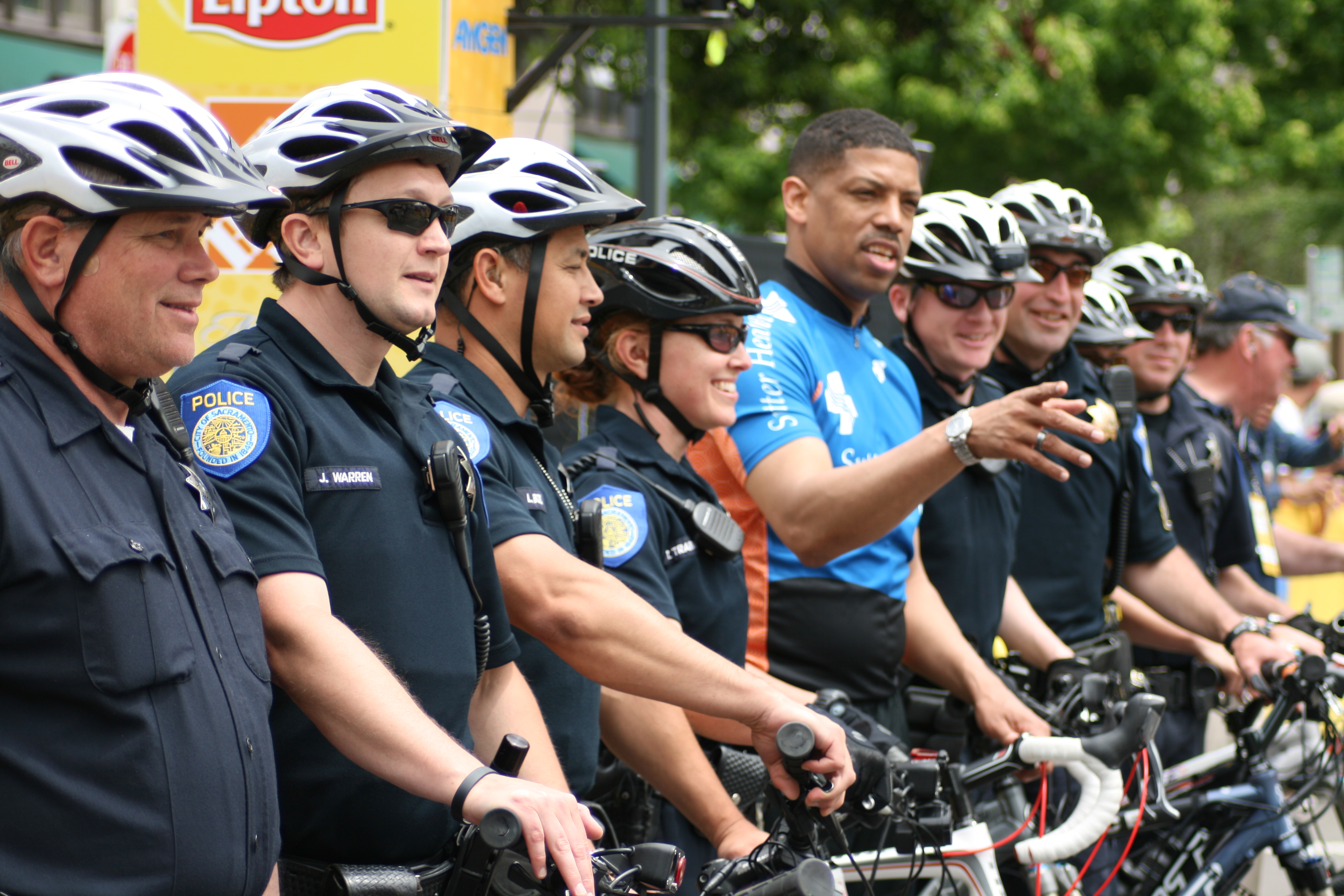
Mayor Kevin Johnson at the 2010 Sacramento Grand Prix bike race

Johnson launched nine initiatives in his first term as Mayor.

Volunteer Sacramento was launched alongside Cities of Service, a bipartisan coalition of mayors founded in 2009 to encourage public service. As one of the founding cities, Sacramento logged 1.7 million hours of service and created $22 million in economic impact in 2009. In 2010, 3 million hours of service were logged, adding a $70 million economic impact in the region. For these efforts, Sacramento was awarded a City of Service Leadership Grant.

For Arts' Sake was launched to increase interest and support of Sacramento's local art. In response to this commitment, Sacramento was chosen by the John F. Kennedy Center for the Performing Arts in Washington, D.C. as the first city in the nation to pilot the "Any Given Child" program. The program is designed to bring equal access to arts programming for children K-8. It currently operates in Sacramento City Unified School District and Twin Rivers Unified School District.

Sacramento Steps Forward is an initiative launched to end chronic homelessness in Sacramento. Johnson assumed leadership as Chair of the regional Policy Board to End Homelessness and joined the U.S. Conference of Mayors' Task Force on Hunger and Homelessness in 2009. By 2011, 2,350 households were moved into permanent housing and Sacramento was awarded approximately $6 million through the Homelessness Prevention and Rapid Re-housing Program.

Johnson launched the STAND UP education initiative to increase student achievement in Sacramento schools with $6 million being raised to bring education reform and innovative programming to Sacramento.

In 2010, Johnson was the founding chair of the U.S. Conference of Mayors' Public Schools Task Force and the Co-Chair of U.S. Secretary of Education Arne Duncan's Mayoral Advisory Council.

The Greenwise initiative was launched to diversify economic development, go green, and promote Sacramento as the "Emerald Valley." Sacramento was selected by President Obama to participate in the Better Buildings Challenge which provides federal investment to achieve energy efficiency. Sacramento committed to reducing energy use 20% by 2020 in 12 million square feet of building space. The Greenwise initiative works to establish programs to achieve this commitment.

Think Big was launched to facilitate the economic development of Sacramento, including the construction of a new entertainment and sports complex. Think Big oversees progress at the downtown Railyards, an area that has been left unutilized since the 1980s and is currently one of the largest urban infill project in the country.

In 2011 Johnson launched another education initiative, Sacramento READS!, in response to the "literacy crisis in Sacramento." Beginning in 2011, Sacramento READS! was designed as a 10-year initiative to ensure all children in Sacramento can read at grade level by the end of 3rd grade by focusing on school readiness, attendance, and limiting summer learning loss.

The City-Schools Collaborative was launched to better align city services with school districts to maximize resources to support public education.

The Gang Prevention Task Force was launched to form a three-year city-county partnership to reduce gang violence through school-based and job-training programs. Johnson acquired over $17 million in federal and state stimulus dollars for law enforcement and community policing.

== Affiliations and awards ==
In June 2012 Johnson was elected the second vice president of the United States Conference of Mayors (USCM). He became the first Sacramento mayor to be elected to the second vice president position and became the first Sacramento mayor to serve as president, which he was set to assume in 2014. This was the second national leadership position Johnson assumed in 2012, as he was previously elected to the first vice president of the National Conference of Black Mayors, where he assumed the presidency in 2013. After becoming president of the National Conference of Black Mayors (NCBM), Johnson took steps that resulted in the dissolution of the organization.

Johnson has served on the board of directors for the University of California Alumni Association, Phoenix Suns Charities, Christian Athlete Ministries, Phoenix Symphony, the School House Foundation, Jobs for America's Graduates (JAG), and on the advisory board for the Caring Institute.

In 1991, Former President George H. W. Bush honored Johnson with as the 411th Point of Light recipient in recognition of Johnson's concern and compassion for children and education. In addition to being selected as one of the "15 Greatest Men on Earth" by McCall's, Johnson has received the NBA's J. Walter Kennedy Citizenship Award, the John R. Wooden Lifetime Achievement Award 2008, the Good Morning America Award from Sports Illustrated, the "Most Caring American" award by the Caring Institute, and induction into the World Sports Humanitarian Hall of Fame in Boise, Idaho.

== Personal life ==
Johnson married Michelle Rhee, the former Chancellor of the District of Columbia School System, on September 3, 2011, in front of 40 people at Tennessee mountain resort Blackberry Farm. They had originally planned to get married the year before, but decided to postpone it in the wake of a large amount of press attention to their nuptials.

=== Sexual misconduct allegations ===
A teenager told Phoenix police in 1996 that Johnson had allegedly molested her in his home during the summer of 1995, when she was sixteen years old. During a phone conversation secretly recorded by detectives, Johnson apologized to the girl after she confronted him with the accusation. However, he also stated that "what you're saying happened, I'm not entirely agreeing happened." The Sacramento Bee stated that they had received a copy of a proposed settlement agreement, under which Johnson would have paid the girl's family $230,000. After conducting an investigation, the Maricopa County Attorney's Office declined to prosecute, on the grounds that there was not a reasonable likelihood of conviction. On October 8, 2015, press accounts surfaced of a 1996 police video which showed detectives saying there was a likely chance that he was abusing her and others.

On April 16, 2008, rival mayoral candidate Leonard Padilla distributed a 2007 report of similar allegations made against Johnson at St. HOPE Sacramento High School; these accusations were investigated by local police, but no charges were filed. On April 29, 2008, a group of female civic leaders that included former Sacramento Mayor Anne Rudin, Sacramento Municipal Utility District board member Genevieve Shiroma, and former State Senator Deborah Ortiz demanded the release of the police report on the matter.

The teacher to whom the student initially brought the complaint subsequently resigned over the incident, claiming, "St. HOPE sought to intimidate the student through an illegal interrogation and even had the audacity to ask me to change my story." Two classmates and a school counselor confirmed the teacher's version of events. Sacramento Police Chief Rick Braziel responded, saying, "I think the allegations at the school were handled in the way that you would want them handled. Immediately they followed all the normal protocols that they were supposed to follow. I think it was pretty clear there was nothing there... We did ask the young lady whether anyone had influenced her—her answer was no." The Sacramento County Sheriff John McGinness said on May 30, 2008, that Johnson's actions, though ill-advised, were not illegal.

== See also ==
- List of NBA franchise career scoring leaders
- List of NBA career assists leaders
- List of NBA career playoff assists leaders
- List of NBA single-game assists leaders
- List of NBA single-game steals leaders
- List of first African-American mayors
- African American mayors in California

Political offices
Preceded by Heather Fargo	Mayor of Sacramento; 2008–2016	Succeeded by Darrell Steinberg
