= 2000 Sacramento mayoral election =

Sacramento mayoral election, 2000
- March 7, 2000 (first round); November 7, 2000 (runoff)
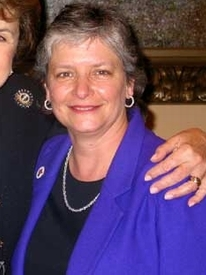

Candidate	Heather Fargo	Rob Kerth	Robbie Waters
Party	Democratic	Nonpartisan	Nonpartisan
First-round vote	20,583	17,095	17,247
First-round percentage	21.8%	18.2%	18.2%
Second-round vote	66,332	56,343
Second-round percentage	54.1%	45.9%
Candidate	Joe Genshlea	Julie Padilla	Steve Cohn
Party	Nonpartisan	Nonpartisan	Nonpartisan
First-round vote	13,890	11,047	8,586
First-round percentage	14.7%	11.7%	9.1%
Mayor before election
Jimmie R. Yee
Democratic
Elected mayor
Heather Fargo
Democratic

The 2000 Sacramento mayoral election was held on March 7, 2000 and November 7, 2000 to elect the mayor of Sacramento, California. It saw the election of Heather Fargo.

== Results ==
=== First round ===
First round results
Candidate	Votes	%
Heather Fargo	20,583	21.8
Rob Kerth	19,095	20.2
Robbie Waters	17,095	18.2
Joe Genshlea	13,890	14.7
Julie Padilla	11,047	11.7
Steve Cohn	8,586	9.1
Nathan Barry	1,738	1.8
Rowland R. Reeves	1,067	1.1
Ronald E. Anderson	732	0.8
Albert Estrada	613	0.6

=== Runoff results ===
Runoff results
Candidate	Votes	%
Heather Fargo	66,332	54.1
Rob Kerth	56,343	45.9
