= Darrell Steinberg =

American politician and attorney (born 1959)

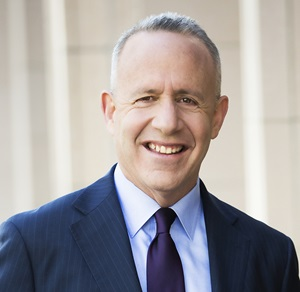

56th Mayor of Sacramento
- In office December 13, 2016 – December 10, 2024
- Preceded by: Kevin Johnson
- Succeeded by: Kevin McCarty

49th President pro tempore of the California Senate
- In office December 1, 2008 – October 15, 2014
- Preceded by: Don Perata
- Succeeded by: Kevin de León

Member of the California Senate from the 6th district
- In office December 4, 2006 – November 30, 2014
- Preceded by: Deborah Ortiz
- Succeeded by: Richard Pan

Member of the California State Assembly from the 9th district
- In office December 7, 1998 – November 30, 2004
- Preceded by: Deborah Ortiz
- Succeeded by: Dave Jones

Member of the Sacramento City Council from the 6th district
- In office 1992–1998
- Preceded by: Kimberly J. Mueller
- Succeeded by: Dave Jones

Personal details
- Born: Darrell Steven Steinberg; October 15, 1959 (age 67) San Francisco, California, U.S.
- Party: Democratic
- Spouse: Julie Steinberg
- Children: 2
- Education: University of California, Los Angeles (BA); University of California, Davis (JD)

Darrell Steven Steinberg (born October 15, 1959) is an American politician and attorney who was the 56th mayor of Sacramento, California from 2016 to 2024. He was elected to be mayor on June 7, 2016 (avoiding a runoff). Previously, he was California Senate President pro Tempore and the leader of the majority party in the California State Senate from 2008 to 2014.

Steinberg was a Democratic member of the California State Senate representing the 6th District. He had also previously served as a member of the California State Assembly (1998–2004) and as a member of the Sacramento City Council (1992–1998).

== Early life, education and early career ==
Born in San Francisco to a Jewish family, Steinberg graduated from Capuchino High School in Millbrae-San Bruno, California, and from University of California, Los Angeles where he earned a Bachelor of Arts in economics. He then earned a Juris Doctor from the University of California, Davis School of Law.

He served as an employee rights attorney for the California State Employees Association for 10 years before his work as an Administrative Law Judge and mediator. He has continued to mediate disputes of public interest during his tenure as mayor. In 2022, he mediated a dispute between the National Union of Healthcare Workers and Kaiser Permanente, and was appointed to mediate between the University of California and the United Auto Workers during the 2022 University of California academic workers' strike. He also was once a UAW member.

== California State Assembly ==
Steinberg was a member of the California State Assembly from 1998 until he was termed out in 2004. During his time in the Assembly he served as chair of the Assembly Committees on Budget, Appropriations, Judiciary, Labor and Employment, and the Select Committee on High Priority Schools. He authored 80 bills that were signed into law in areas that included mental health, K-12 education, foster care, and workplace safety. Steinberg is considered a strong advocate for children and mental health issues. He opposed mandatory arbitration clauses.

Steinberg authored legislation to focus additional educational resources on high-poverty schools and make them more accountable for improvement. He authored several laws to improve the state's foster care system, including measures to improve system accountability and educational stability. His legislation in foster care included AB 408, which mandated steps to help older foster youth find permanent homes and families. He also passed AB 34, the first significant expansion of community mental health programs in more than a decade.

Steinberg also authored AB 1127, a landmark bill to give stronger prosecutorial power to district attorneys to address serious and willful violations of Cal/OSHA regulations that result in worker injuries and deaths. Some supporters called this legislation "the Tosco bill" because of an accident that occurred at the Tosco Refinery near Martinez, California in 1999. The accident, which resulted in four deaths, was held up as an example of insufficient penalties for dangerous workplace-safety violations.

== State Senate ==
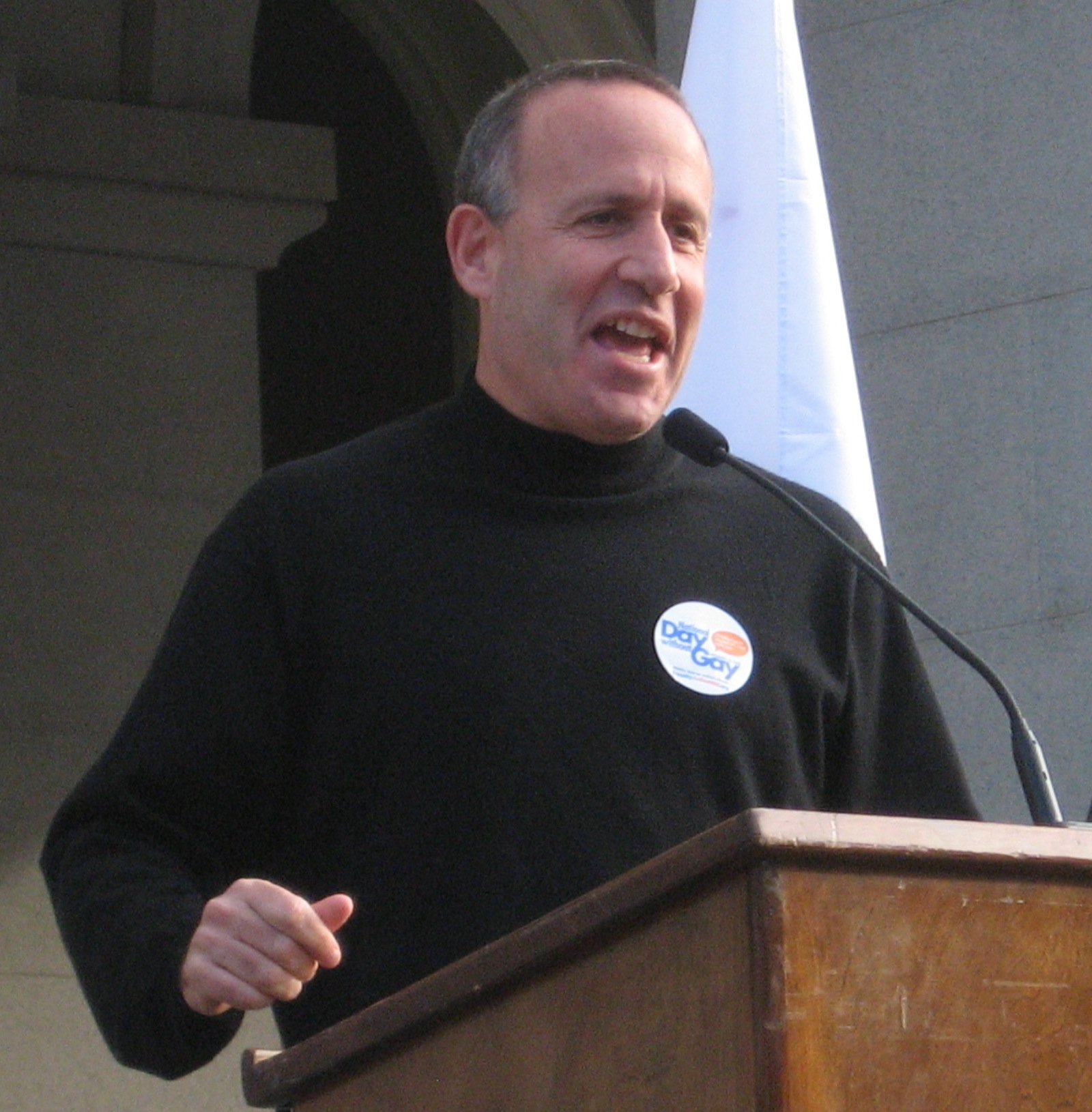
Steinberg in 2008

Steinberg was the President pro Tempore of the California State Senate from 2008 to 2014. In February 2008, he was selected by Senate Democrats to become Pro Tem in the next legislative session, when the incumbent would be termed-out. He took office in November 2008 as the first Senate leader from Sacramento since 1883.

Before being elevated to Pro Tem, he was Chair of the Senate Natural Resources and Water Committee. He also chaired the Senate Select Committee on High School Graduation., the Mental Health Services Oversight and Accountability Commission, and the Legislative Blue Ribbon Commission on Autism.

As a member of the State Senate, Steinberg continued many of the same causes he had undertaken as a member of the Assembly. He continued his work on improving test scores, aiding under performing schools, lowering dropout rates, and improving the state's mental health system. In 2007, Steinberg introduced a bill to cap at 20 the number of hours high school students can work after school if their grade point average is not 2.5 or higher.

On November 13, 2013, State Sen. Ron Calderon lashed out at Federal authorities claiming that they wanted him to record conversations between Sen. Steinberg and fellow Sen. Kevin De Leon in a sting operation targeting Steinberg and De Leon.

=== Mental healthcare advocate ===
Throughout his legislative career, Steinberg has been a strong advocate for mental health care. He has called it "the under-attended issue in our time and in our society". He is known within the mental health community as a long time champion.

Steinberg became passionate about mental health during his time on the Sacramento City Council. In 1997, the City of Sacramento engaged in a lawsuit against Loaves and Fishes, a private charity providing food to the homeless. The free lunches began to draw thousands of homeless people which had become a nuisance to local business near the shelter in North Sacramento. Former Mayor Joe Serna and then Councilmember Steinberg were the only two members to vote against the lawsuit. Upon further investigation into the rapidly increasing homeless population, Steinberg discovered that an overwhelming portion of homeless suffered from mental illness and did not have access to proper mental health care. He took up working on ways to help solve this issue.

==== AB 34 pilot projects ====
During his first year in the State Assembly, Steinberg authored AB 34, which began three pilot projects that provided integrated services to the homeless in Stanislaus, Los Angeles and Sacramento counties. The pilot was so successful in lowering hospitalization, incarceration and homeless episodes the program was expanded to more than 30 counties in late 2000 as AB 2034. Data collection by the pilot programs demonstrated the success of the services being provided.

==== Mental Health Services Act ====
Steinberg authored Proposition 63, the California Mental Health Services Act, approved by California voters on the November 2004 statewide ballot. The act imposes a 1% tax on incomes of $1,000,000 or more for mental health funding. He co-authored "Prop 63" with advocate Sherman Russell Selix Jr. In the first five years, the program has provided mental health care to 400,000 Californians.

The Mental Health Services Act includes a "whatever-it-takes" approach to support services for people with severe mental illness and is the first of its kind in the United States. Services can include providing a safe place to live, a job, help in school, physical health care, clothing, food, or treatment when a mental illness and a substances abuse disorder are combined. These are examples of full service partnerships which have been proven to be effective in helping people with severe mental illness transition successfully to independent living situations.

The Act also provides Prevention and Early Intervention services (PEI). PEI improves mental health care treatment by creating programs in places where mental health services are not traditionally given, such as schools, community centers and faith-based organizations. The intent of PEI programs is to engage individuals before the development of serious mental illness or serious emotional disturbance or to alleviate the need for additional or extended mental health treatment.

The Mental Health Services Act has proven to be a cost-effective way to address mental health care. A 2012 report found that every dollar spent of mental health services in California saved roughly $0.88 in costs to criminal justice and health, and housing services by reducing the number of arrests, incarcerations, ER visits, and hospitalizations.

== Mayor of Sacramento (2016–2024) ==
=== Tenure ===
In 2021, Steinberg backed a legislative proposal that would make Sacramento the first city in California to end zoning that permits only the construction of one single-family home on a property. The proposal was intended to deal with the housing shortage and skyrocketing rents in California.

In June 2021, Steinberg was one of 11 U.S. mayors to form Mayors Organized for Reparations and Equity (MORE), a coalition of municipal leaders dedicated to starting pilot reparations programs in their cities.

== Personal life ==
Steinberg is married to his wife Julie and has two children: daughter Jordana and son Ari. They live in the Pocket-Greenhaven neighborhood of Sacramento.

== Electoral history ==
=== State Assembly ===
1998

1998 California's 9th Assembly district Democratic primary
Party	Candidate	Votes	%
Democratic	Darrell Steinberg	14,992	63.20
Democratic	Robert Pernell	11,501	20.69
Democratic	Alice Huffman	7,379	13.27
Democratic	Frances Gracechild	7,238	13.02
Democratic	Leslie J. Cochren	4,597	8.27

1998 California's 9th Assembly district election
Party	Candidate	Votes	%
Democratic	Darrell Steinberg	66,867	72.32
Republican	Mike Dismukes	25,591	27.68

2000

2000 California's 9th Assembly district Democratic primary
Party	Candidate	Votes	%
Democratic	Darrell Steinberg (incumbent)	55,705	100

2000 California's 9th Assembly district election
Party	Candidate	Votes	%
Democratic	Darrell Steinberg	75,953	70.2
Republican	Charles Hargrave	24,572	22.8
Green	Jan Louis Bergeron	5,698	5.2
Natural Law	Bruce B. Saunders	2,012	1.8

2002

2002 California's 9th Assembly district Democratic primary
Party	Candidate	Votes	%
Democratic	Darrell Steinberg (incumbent)	33,311	100

2002 California's 9th Assembly district election
Party	Candidate	Votes	%
Democratic	Darrell Steinberg (incumbent)	58,883	69.90
Republican	David A. Pegos	22,146	26.20
Libertarian	Douglas M. Poston	3,322	3.90

=== State Senate ===
2006

2006 California's 6th State Senate district Democratic primary
Party	Candidate	Votes	%
Democratic	Darrell Steinberg	51,252	81.6
Democratic	Sam J. Hawkins	11,615	18.4

2006 California's 6th State Senate district election
Party	Candidate	Votes	%
Democratic	Darrell Steinberg (incumbent)	115,628	58.7
Republican	Paul R. Green, Jr.	71,051	36.1
Peace and Freedom	C.T. Weber	5,573	2.8
Libertarian	Alana N. Garberoglio	4,774	2.4

2010

2010 California's 6th State Senate district Democratic primary
Party	Candidate	Votes	%
Democratic	Darrell Steinberg (incumbent)	64,965	100

2010 California's 6th State Senate district election
Party	Candidate	Votes	%
Democratic	Darrell Steinberg (incumbent)	137,012	61.0
Republican	Marcel Weiland	71,051	31.5
Libertarian	Steve Torno	11,236	4.9
Peace and Freedom	Lanric Hyland	5,916	2.6

=== Mayor ===
2016 Sacramento mayoral election
Candidate	Votes	%
Darrell Steinberg	62,000	54.52
Angelique Ashby	29,519	25.96
Tony "The Tiger" Lopez	9,519	8.37
Marlene Andrade	2,132	1.88
Michael Edwards	1,814	1.60
Russell Rawlings	1,344	1.18
Richard Jones	751	0.66
Aaron Carranza	312	0.27
Charles Frazier (write-in)	4	0.00
Other write-ins	134	0.12
Total votes	113,728	100
Turnout	{{{votes}}}	47.54%

2020 Sacramento mayoral election
Candidate	Votes	%
Darrell Steinberg (incumbent)	89,048	77.25
Mac Arteaga	15,821	13.73
Jamar Jefferson	10,399	9.02
Total votes	115,268	100

== See also ==
- List of mayors of the 50 largest cities in the United States

California Senate
Preceded by Don Perata	President pro tempore of the California Senate; 2008–2014	Succeeded by Kevin de León
Political offices
Preceded by Kevin Johnson	Mayor of Sacramento; 2016–2024	Succeeded by Kevin McCarty
