= Marc Levine (California politician) =

American politician

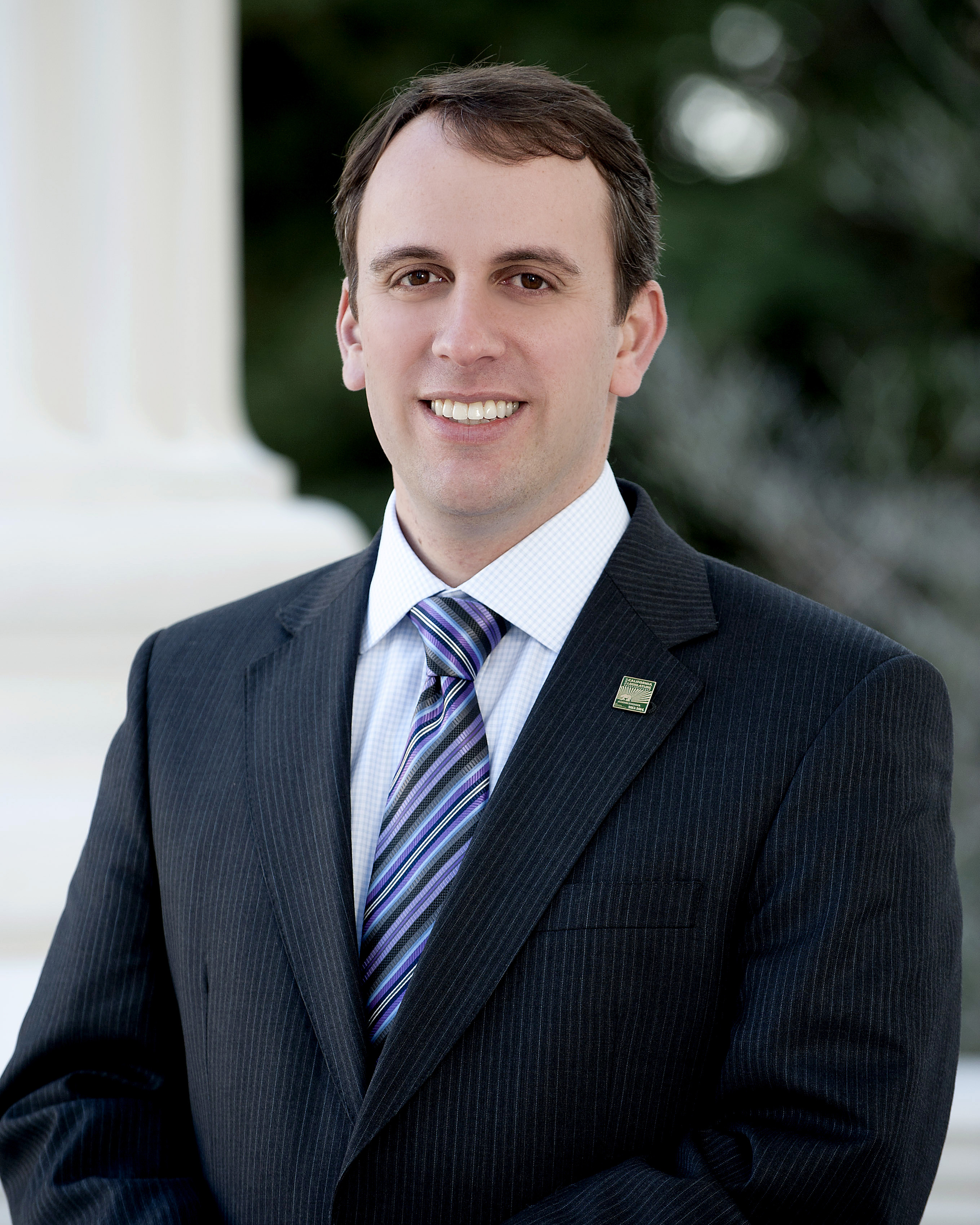
- Official portrait, 2013

Member of the California State Assembly from the 10th district
- In office December 3, 2012 – November 30, 2022
- Preceded by: Alyson Huber
- Succeeded by: Stephanie Nguyen

Personal details
- Born: April 26, 1974 (age 52) Los Angeles, California, U.S.
- Party: Democratic
- Spouse: Wendy
- Children: 2
- Education: California State University, Northridge (BA); Naval Postgraduate School (MS)

Marc Levine (born April 26, 1974) is an American politician, who served in the California State Assembly representing the 10th district between 2012 and 2022. A member of the Democratic Party, Levine is the former chairman of the California Legislative Jewish Caucus. A former member of the San Rafael City Council, Levine previously worked as a technology entrepreneur.

Levine was a candidate for California Insurance Commissioner in the 2022 election.

== Early life, education, and career ==
Marc Levine was born in Los Angeles, California. He graduated from California State University, Northridge with a bachelor's degree in Political Science and went on to Naval Postgraduate School to earn his master's degree.

Before elected office, Levine worked as a senior product manager for Benetech, a social enterprise technology company, executive director of a web site promoting tsunami relief, and a business development strategy manager for a software company.

== California State Assembly ==
=== Elections ===
Levine served on the San Rafael City Council. Levine's election to the California State Assembly in 2012 was an upset. He was outspent five-to-one by a fellow Democrat, state Assemblyman Michael Allen. Levine was reelected in 2014 with 105,636 votes and received more votes than any other member of the State Assembly.

=== Tenure ===
==== Immigration ====
Levine has stated: "Immigrants are welcome and we will do everything we can to help them achieve legal status." In 2015, authored two immigration bills— both of which were signed by Governor Brown.

AB 899 safeguards the privacy of immigrant children by requiring federal immigration officials to obtain a court order before accessing juvenile records. AB 900 helps unaccompanied minor immigrants who are escaping violence and exploitation to receive humanitarian relief through the Special Immigrant Juvenile Status visa process.

In 2014, Levine worked with legislative leaders and Governor Brown to pass legislation providing $3 million in legal aid for undocumented immigrants.

== California Insurance Commissioner primary Election 2022 ==
Marc Levine ran unsuccessfully in the June 2022 Democratic Statewide Primary for California State Insurance Commissioner gaining 18% of the votes (1,208,645 votes) losing to the incumbent Ricardo Lara with 35.9% of the votes (2,414,714 votes). Ricardo Lara went on to win reelection in the November 8, 2022 General Election against Republican Candidate Robert Howell.

== Personal life ==
Levine is Jewish. He lives in Marin County with his wife Wendy and their two children.

== Electoral history ==
=== 2012 California State Assembly ===
California State Assembly election, 2012
Primary election
| Party | Candidate | Votes | % |
|---|---|---|---|
| Democratic | Michael Allen (incumbent) | 32,922 | 31.0 |
| Democratic | Marc Levine | 25,920 | 24.4 |
| Republican | Peter J. Mancus | 22,708 | 21.4 |
| Democratic | Connie Wong | 11,371 | 10.7 |
| Democratic | Alex Easton-Brown | 6,563 | 6.2 |
| No party preference | Joe Boswell | 4,544 | 4.3 |
| Democratic | H. Christian Gunderson | 2,323 | 2.2 |
| Total votes | | 106,351 | 100.0 |
General election
| Democratic | Marc Levine | 96,421 | 51.2 |
| Democratic | Michael Allen (incumbent) | 91,973 | 48.8 |
| Total votes | | 188,394 | 100.0 |
| Democratic hold | | | |

=== 2014 California State Assembly ===
California's 10th State Assembly district election, 2014
Primary election
| Party | Candidate | Votes | % |
|---|---|---|---|
| Democratic | Marc Levine (incumbent) | 45,597 | 49.2 |
| Republican | Gregory Allen | 18,705 | 20.2 |
| Democratic | Diana M. Conti | 16,644 | 18.0 |
| Democratic | Erin Carlstrom | 7,092 | 7.7 |
| Democratic | Veronica "Roni" Jacobi | 4,593 | 5.0 |
| Total votes | | 92,631 | 100.0 |
General election
| Democratic | Marc Levine (incumbent) | 105,636 | 74.6 |
| Republican | Gregory Allen | 35,999 | 25.4 |
| Total votes | | 141,635 | 100.0 |
| Democratic hold | | | |

=== 2016 California State Assembly ===
California's 10th State Assembly district election, 2016
Primary election
| Party | Candidate | Votes | % |
|---|---|---|---|
| Democratic | Marc Levine (incumbent) | 100,578 | 65.4 |
| Democratic | Veronica "Roni" Jacobi | 27,232 | 17.7 |
| Republican | Gregory Allen | 26,081 | 16.9 |
| Total votes | | 153,891 | 100.0 |
General election
| Democratic | Marc Levine (incumbent) | 140,207 | 68.2 |
| Democratic | Veronica "Roni" Jacobi | 65,355 | 31.8 |
| Total votes | | 205,562 | 100.0 |
| Democratic hold | | | |

=== 2018 California State Assembly ===
California's 10th State Assembly district election, 2018
Primary election
| Party | Candidate | Votes | % |
|---|---|---|---|
| Democratic | Marc Levine (incumbent) | 97,186 | 80.4 |
| Democratic | Dan Monte | 23,637 | 19.6 |
| Total votes | | 120,823 | 100.0 |
General election
| Democratic | Marc Levine (incumbent) | 139,050 | 71.7 |
| Democratic | Dan Monte | 54,758 | 28.3 |
| Total votes | | 193,808 | 100.0 |
| Democratic hold | | | |

=== 2020 California State Assembly ===
2020 California's 10th State Assembly district election
Primary election
| Party | Candidate | Votes | % |
|---|---|---|---|
| Democratic | Marc Levine (incumbent) | 112,683 | 62.0 |
| Democratic | Veronica "Roni" Jacobi | 32,663 | 18.0 |
| Republican | Ron Sondergaard | 31,284 | 17.2 |
| Democratic | Ted Cabral | 5,192 | 2.9 |
| Total votes | | 181,822 | 100 |
