= Urban redevelopment in Sacramento, California =

The City of Sacramento, which serves as the state capital of California, was founded in December 1848 by John Sutter. The following year, California's Gold Rush brought an influx of "forty-niners" and, shortly thereafter, goods, services, and industry to meet the needs of the booming population. Throughout the late 19th and early 20th centuries, Sacramento's commercial, industrial, government, and residential uses flourished, creating a vibrant urban downtown.

By the middle of the 20th century, however, much of historic downtown Sacramento had fallen into disrepair and neglect. This decline was driven by several factors, including disinvestment, white flight, redlining, and inadequate maintenance of infrastructure. Residents began moving further east into the growing suburbs along the American River. Between 1950 and 1970, Sacramento experienced significant changes in its residential and commercial landscape due to urban renewal efforts and highway development.

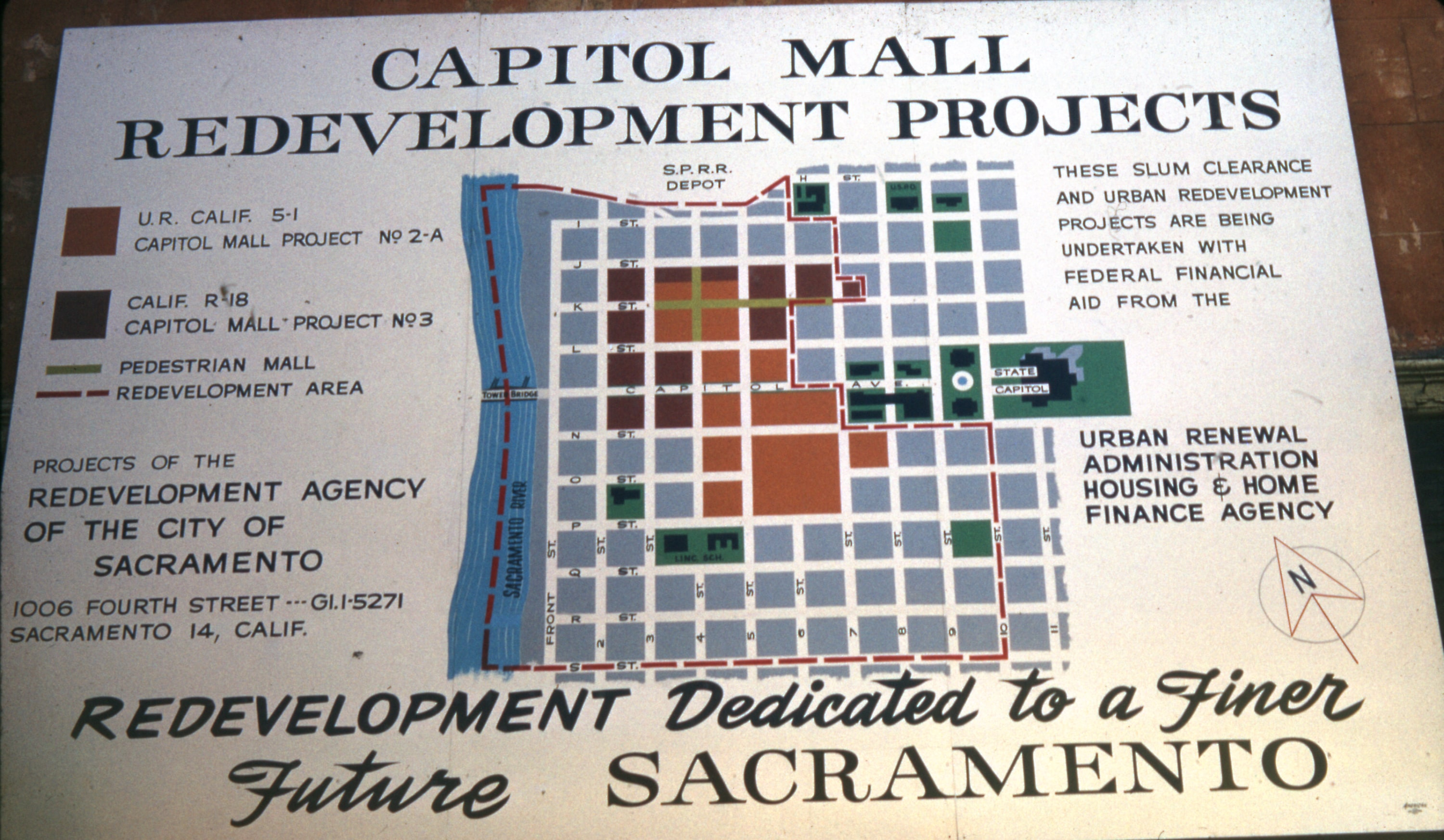
Capitol Mall Redevelopment Project

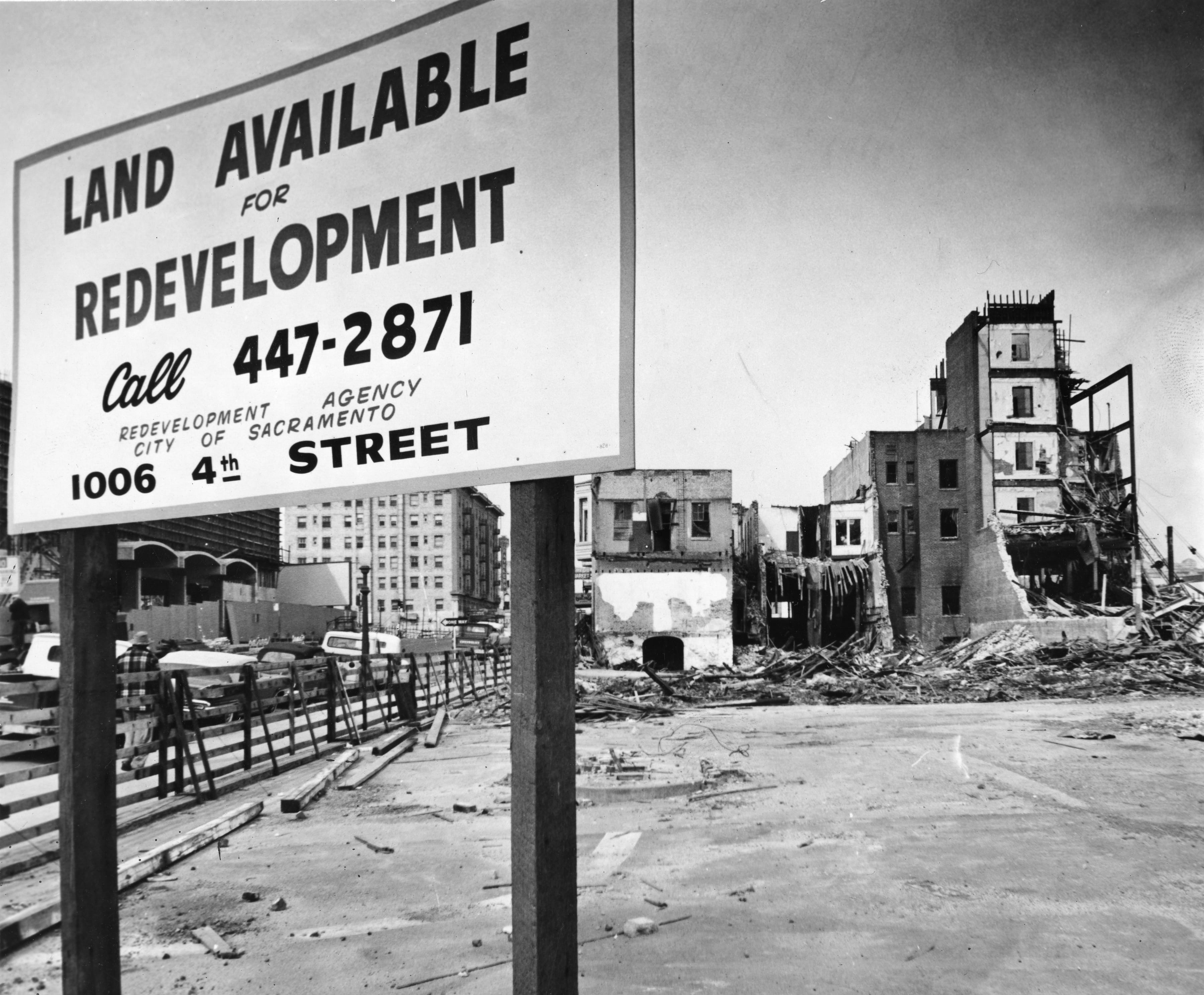
Sacramento Redevelopment Agency Advertisement.

The Federal Housing Act of 1949 aimed to eliminate substandard living conditions and provided subsidies for urban renewal projects. Initially focused on improving residential areas, amendments in 1954 shifted the emphasis to commercial development. Sacramento city planners capitalized on these changes to transform the West End into a commercial district. By 1950, almost 70 percent of the city's minority population lived in the West End with 87 percent of the city's Mexican residents, 75 percent of the city's Asian population (many of them Japanese returning from relocation camps), and 60 percent of the city's Black population residing there (Hernandez 2009). In addition to these redevelopment efforts, the construction of interstate highways further shaped the city's landscape and demographic patterns. The development of Interstate 5 and Interstate 80, along with U.S. Route 50, created physical barriers that isolated certain neighborhoods, particularly those with high concentrations of minority residents. According to the 1950 U.S. Census, approximately 7,900 or 75 percent of the city's 10,700 non-White residents resided in census tracts directly affected by redevelopment and freeway construction (City of Sacramento). In the span of two years, urban renewal initiatives completely razed 15 city blocks, primarily in the West End, while highway construction claimed over 100 city blocks in central Sacramento over a span of 20 years. In 1950, 48% of West End residents were non-White, but by 1970, non-White residents accounted for only 5% of the West End population.

Interest in urban redevelopment and historic preservation grew in the 1970s and began to take shape in the 1980s with the publicly financed renewal of Old Sacramento and the private development of several office buildings along the Capital Mall. After a slight lull in development due to the recession of the early 1990s, Mayor Heather Fargo made the downtown a pillar of her program in 2001. Since then, the increase in population, traffic, and housing values has increased interest in downtown living among metropolitan residents, making high-rise condominium living financially viable. A multitude of private and government developments have emerged in the capital city over the past two years.
