= 2016 Sacramento mayoral election =

Sacramento mayoral election, 2016
- June 7, 2016
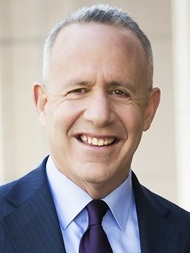

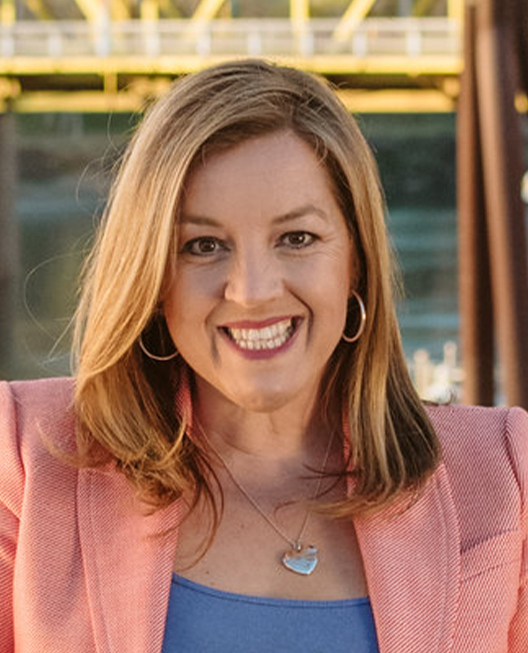

Candidate	Darrell Steinberg	Angelique Ashby	Tony "The Tiger" Lopez
Popular vote	62,000	29,519	9,519
Percentage	54.52%	25.96%	8.37%
Mayor before election
Kevin Johnson
Elected mayor
Darrell Steinberg

The 2016 Sacramento mayoral election was held on June 7, 2016, to elect the mayor of Sacramento, California. It saw the election of Darrell Steinberg. Since Steinberg won a majority in the first round, no runoff was required.

Municipal elections in California are officially non-partisan.

== Results ==
In the June 7, 2016 elections, voter turnout in Sacramento County, in which Sacramento is located, was 47.54%. Coinciding elections included the California presidential primaries.

Sacramento mayoral election, 2016
Candidate	Votes	%
Darrell Steinberg	62,000	54.52
Angelique Ashby	29,519	25.96
Tony "The Tiger" Lopez	9,519	8.37
Marlene Andrade	2,132	1.88
Michael Edwards	1,814	1.60
Russell Rawlings	1,344	1.18
Richard Jones	751	0.66
Aaron Carranza	312	0.27
Charles Frazier (write-in)	4	0.00
Other write-ins	134	0.12
Total votes	113,728	
