= 2020 Sacramento mayoral election =

Sacramento mayoral election, 2020
- March 3, 2020
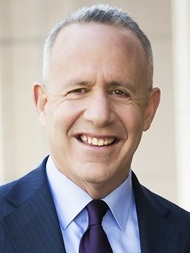

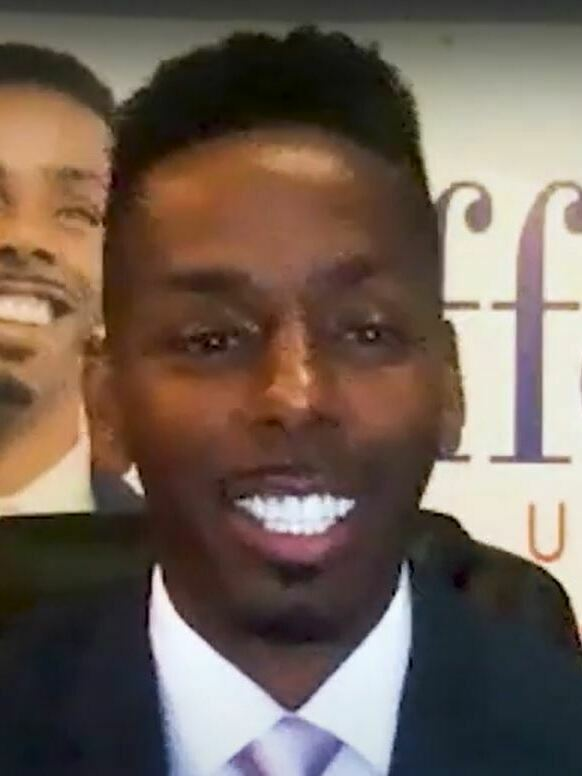
Candidate	Darrell Steinberg	Mac Arteaga	Jrmar Jefferson
Popular vote	89,048	15,821	10,399
Percentage	77.25%	13.73%	9.02%
- Results by precinct Steinberg: 60–70% 70–80% 80–90% Arteaga: 60–70% >90% Jefferson: 60–70% No Data
Mayor before election
Darrell Steinberg
Elected mayor
Darrell Steinberg

The 2020 Sacramento mayoral election was held on March 3, 2020 to elect the mayor of Sacramento, California. It saw the reelection of Darrell Steinberg. Since Steinberg won a majority in the first round, no runoff was required.

Municipal elections in California are officially non-partisan.

== Results ==
Sacramento mayoral election, 2020
Candidate	Votes	%
Darrell Steinberg (incumbent)	89,048	77.25
Mac Arteaga	15,821	13.73
Jrmar Jefferson	10,399	9.02
Total votes	115,268	100
