= Deborah Ortiz =

American politician

Deborah V. Ortiz

Member of the California Senate from the 6th district
- In office December 7, 1998 – November 30, 2006
- Preceded by: Leroy F. Greene
- Succeeded by: Darrell Steinberg

Member of the California State Assembly from the 9th district
- In office December 2, 1996 – November 30, 1998
- Preceded by: Phillip Isenberg
- Succeeded by: Darrell Steinberg

Member of the Sacramento City Council from the 5th district
- In office March 1993 – November 1996
- Preceded by: Joe Serna Jr.
- Succeeded by: Lauren Hammond

Personal details
- Born: March 19, 1957 (age 69) Sacramento, California, U.S.
- Party: Democratic
- Education: University of California, Davis; University of the Pacific (J.D.)

Deborah V. Ortiz (born March 19, 1957, in Sacramento) is an American politician from Sacramento, California. A Democrat, she served in both chambers of the California State Legislature. A then-member of Sacramento City Council, Ortiz was elected to the California State Assembly in 1996 and served a single two-year term representing the 9th Assembly district. In 1998, she was elected to the California State Senate from the 6th Senate district with 55% of the vote and won re-election in 2002 with 70.8% of the vote. Term limits prevented her from seeking a third Senate term in 2006; she instead ran unsuccessfully for Secretary of State.

== Sacramento City Council ==
=== Election ===
Ortiz was first elected to public office in a special election in March 1993 when she was elected to the Sacramento City Council. In a field of six candidates, Ortiz received 36% of the vote and was elected to the seat of Joe Serna who had been elected Mayor of Sacramento in November 1992. Prior to that she had served as Chief of Staff to then State Assemblyman Richard Polanco and as a leader at the Latino Coalition for Fair Sacramento Redistricting.

Ortiz had also served on the Sacramento County Planning Commission, the Oak Park Project Area Committee and the UC Davis Medical Center Community Advisory Board.

=== Accomplishments ===
Ortiz was known as a major advocate for Oak Park, the neighborhood where she lived and was raised. Oak Park had a long history as one of the most blighted and crime ridden neighborhoods in the City of Sacramento. Ortiz authored ordinances to hold absentee landlords accountable by imposing penalties on neglected vacant properties and she established a cash reward program for reporting of illegal dumping in neighborhoods. Ortiz also authored an ordinance that required gun dealers to register with the police department and precluded them from locating near schools and day care centers. In 1995, Ortiz managed to have US Bank open the first new bank in Oak Park in thirty years.

== 1996 Assembly bid ==
After nearly four years on the city council, Ortiz decided to run for the Assembly seat that Phil Isenberg, a former Mayor of Sacramento was vacating due to term limits. In the Democratic primary, she faced County Supervisor Roger Dickinson and Bill Camp. In a three-way race, Ortiz defeated Dickinson and Camp by over 50%. Ortiz was easily elected in the November general election against token opposition.

== Legislative issues ==
Ortiz focused on health and passed the first law in the nation protecting embryonic stem cell research. She was the first legislator to ban sodas from primary and middle schools when she passed SB 677 in 2003. Ortiz passed laws that created the California Biomonitoring Program, established the California Lead Abatement standards program, established the standards for Chromium 6 in drinking water, and created the California Department of Public Health. Ortiz also authored the historic Cal Grant Scholarship Program that guarantees college grants for poor and working class students who attend California schools.

Ortiz is well known for authoring the California Freedom of Access to Clinic and Church Entrances Act (or California FACE Act) and the Reproductive Rights Law Enforcement Act in 2001. Passed by the Legislature and signed into law by Governor Davis, the law protects reproductive health care clients, providers and assistants and also worshipers and places of worship. Motivated by attacks on abortion patients, providers, clinics, and clinic escorts, it targets crimes, not First Amendment-protected speech.

She also authored laws that required criminal background checks for school employees after the death of Michelle Montoya at Rio Linda High School. Michelle Montoya was brutally raped and murdered on a school campus by a janitor that had been released from prison for manslaughter. Montoya was the daughter of a friend of Ortiz.

Ortiz also passed laws to create funding for ovarian cancer research and laws to ensure access to emergency contraception.

Ortiz also authored SB 400 that allowed public employees to receive more generous pensions and provided local government the authority to vote to increase public employee pensions. Many argue that changes enacted by the bill have contributed to fiscal crisis in the State of California.

== 2006 bid for Secretary of State ==
Ortiz was termed out of office in 2006 having served two terms in the Senate. Thus, she decided to run for Secretary of State against incumbent Bruce McPherson. However, Ortiz lost the June 6, 2006 Democratic primary to fellow State Senator Debra Bowen (D-Marina del Rey) who ended up defeating McPherson in November.

== Personal ==
Ortiz was born and raised in the Oak Park neighborhood of the City of Sacramento. Ortiz attended UC Davis for her undergraduate studies and received her Juris Doctor degree from McGeorge School of Law. Ortiz was elected to the Los Rios Community College Board of Trustees in 2010 and reelected in 2014.

== Offices held ==
Los Rios Community College Board of Trustees, Area 6, elected in 2010 and reelected in 2014

Political offices
Preceded by Leroy F. Greene	California State Senator, 6th District; 1998 – 2006	Succeeded by Darrell Steinberg
Preceded by Phil Isenberg	California State Assemblywoman, 9th District; 1996 – 1998	Succeeded by Darrell Steinberg
