= Larry Bowler =

American politician

Member of the California State Assembly from the 10th district
- In office December 7, 1992 – November 30, 1998
- Preceded by: Phillip Isenberg
- Succeeded by: Anthony Pescetti

Personal details
- Born: July 30, 1939 (age 86) Sacramento, California, U.S.
- Party: Republican
- Spouse: Melva (after 1973)
- Children: 3
- Profession: Sheriff's Lieutenant

Larry Bowler (born July 30, 1939) was a Republican politician from the State of California. He represented suburban Sacramento in the California State Assembly from 1992 until 1998.

== Pre political career ==
Bowler was in the Sacramento County Sheriff's office, rising to the rank of lieutenant, for 30 years prior to becoming an assemblyman.

== 1988 election ==
Bowler originally made an unsuccessful run for the state assembly in 1988, losing to then-Assemblyman Phil Isenberg by a margin of 57 percent to 43 percent. More than $1.3 million was spent on the race.
