= California's 10th State Assembly district =

American legislative district

Current assemblymember
Stephanie Nguyen; D–Elk Grove
- Population (2010) • Voting age • Citizen voting age: 465,830; 364,547; 307,078
- Demographics: 68.67% White; 2.54% Black; 20.76% Latino; 5.93% Asian; 0.95% Native American; 0.31% Hawaiian/Pacific Islander; 0.39% other; 0.45% remainder of multiracial
- Registered voters: 278,002
- Registration: 54.07% Democratic; 15.32% Republican; 25.77% No party preference

California's 10th State Assembly district is one of 80 California State Assembly districts. It is represented by Democrat Stephanie Nguyen of Elk Grove.

== District profile ==
The district is composed of the Sacramento metropolitan area.

Sacramento County – (32.71%)

- Elk Grove
- Sacramento – (39.55%)

== Election results from statewide races ==
Year	Office	Results
2021	Recall	No 78.7 – 21.3%
2020	President	Biden 79.4 – 18.4%
2018	Governor	Newsom 77.1 – 22.9%
2018	Senator	Feinstein 61.5 – 38.5%
2016	President	Clinton 75.7 – 18.0%
2016	Senator	Harris 76.2 – 23.8%
2014	Governor	Brown 78.1 – 21.9%
2012	President	Obama 73.8 – 23.3%
2012	Senator	Feinstein 78.2 – 21.8%

== List of assembly members representing the district ==
Due to redistricting, the 10th district has been moved around different parts of the state. The current iteration resulted from the 2021 redistricting by the California Citizens Redistricting Commission.

Assembly members	Party	Years served	Counties represented	Notes
Robert Barnett	Democratic	January 5, 1885 – January 3, 1887	Colusa	
Thomas J. Hart	Democratic	January 3, 1887 – January 7, 1889	Colusa	
J. C. Campbell	Republican	January 7, 1889 – January 5, 1891	Colusa	
H. P. Eakle	Democratic	January 5, 1891 – January 2, 1893	Colusa	
William A. Vann	People's Party	January 2, 1893 – January 7, 1895	Colusa, Glenn, Lake	
William H. Ash	Republican	January 7, 1895 – January 4, 1897	Colusa, Glenn, Lake	
E. A. Bridgeford	Democratic	January 4, 1897 – January 2, 1899	Colusa, Glenn, Lake	
F. B. Glenn	Democratic	January 2, 1899 – January 1, 1901	Colusa, Glenn, Lake	
Thomas J. Sheridan	Democratic	January 1, 1901 – January 5, 1903	Colusa, Glenn, Lake	
Frank A. Duryea	Republican	January 5, 1903 – January 7, 1907	El Dorado, Placer	
E. S. Birdsall	Republican	January 7, 1907 – January 4, 1909	El Dorado, Placer	
Patrick Henry Johnson	Democratic	January 4, 1909 – January 2, 1911	El Dorado, Placer	
Edwin C. Gaylord	Republican	January 2, 1911 – January 6, 1913	El Dorado, Placer	
W. S. Killingsworth Sr	Democratic	January 6, 1913 – January 4, 1915	Solano	
H. J. Widenmann	Progressive	January 4, 1915 – January 8, 1917	Solano	
Oscar W. Hilton	Republican	January 8, 1917 – January 3, 1921	Solano	
Robert B. McPherson	Republican	January 3, 1921 – January 7, 1929	Solano	
Ernest C. Crowley	Democratic	January 7, 1929 – January 2, 1933	Solano, Lake, Napa	
Clifford C. Anglim	Democratic	January 2, 1933 – January 7, 1935	Contra Costa	
Truman H. DeLap	Republican	January 7, 1935 – January 4, 1937	Contra Costa	
Harold F. Sawallisch	Democratic	January 4, 1937 – January 6, 1947	Contra Costa	
George Miller Jr.	Democratic	January 6, 1947 – January 3, 1949	Contra Costa	
Robert Condon	Democratic	January 3, 1949 – January 3, 1953	Contra Costa	
Donald D. Doyle	Republican	January 5, 1953 – January 5, 1959	Contra Costa	
Jerome Waldie	Democratic	January 5, 1959 – June 16, 1966	Contra Costa	Resigned due to winning a special election in California's 14th congressional district.
Vacant		June 16, 1966 – January 2, 1967	Contra Costa	
James W. Dent	Republican	January 2, 1967 – January 1, 1973	Contra Costa	
Daniel Boatwright	Democratic	January 1, 1973 – November 30, 1980	Contra Costa	
William P. Baker	Republican	December 1, 1980 – November 30, 1982	Contra Costa	
Phillip Isenberg	Democratic	December 6, 1982 – November 30, 1992	Contra Costa, Sacramento, San Joaquin	
Larry Bowler	Republican	December 7, 1992 – November 30, 1998	Sacramento, San Joaquin	
Anthony Pescetti	Republican	December 7, 1998 – November 30, 2002	Sacramento, San Joaquin	
Alan Nakanishi	Republican	December 2, 2002 – November 30, 2008	Amador, El Dorado, Sacramento, San Joaquin	
Alyson Huber	Democratic	December 1, 2008 – November 30, 2012	Amador, El Dorado, Sacramento, San Joaquin	
Marc Levine	Democratic	December 3, 2012 – November 30, 2022	Marin, Sonoma	
Stephanie Nguyen	Democratic	December 5, 2022 – present	Sacramento	

== Election results (1990–present) ==
=== 2024 ===
2024 California State Assembly 10th district election
Primary election
Party	Candidate	Votes	%
Democratic	Stephanie Nguyen (incumbent)	59,646	67.6
Republican	Vinaya Singh	28,630	32.4
Total votes		88,276	100.0
General election
Democratic	Stephanie Nguyen (incumbent)	124,509	67.6
Republican	Vinaya Singh	59,665	32.4
Total votes		184,174	100.0
Democratic hold			

=== 2022 ===
2022 California State Assembly 10th district election
Primary election
Party	Candidate	Votes	%
Democratic	Stephanie Nguyen	26,652	29.9
Democratic	Eric Guerra	26,193	29.4
Republican	Eric Rigard	24,293	27.3
Democratic	Tecoy Porter	7,632	8.6
Democratic	Ben Thompkins	4,291	4.8
Total votes		89,061	100.0
General election
Democratic	Stephanie Nguyen	63,570	53.8
Democratic	Eric Guerra	54,595	46.2
Total votes		118,165	100.0
Democratic hold			

=== 2020 ===
2020 California State Assembly 10th district election
Primary election
Party	Candidate	Votes	%
Democratic	Marc Levine (incumbent)	112,683	62.0
Democratic	Veronica "Roni" Jacobi	32,663	18.0
Republican	Ron Sondergaard	31,284	17.2
Democratic	Ted Cabral	5,192	2.9
Total votes		181,822	100.0
General election
Democratic	Marc Levine (incumbent)	158,263	65.7
Democratic	Veronica "Roni" Jacobi	82,638	34.3
Total votes		240,901	100.0
Democratic hold			

=== 2018 ===
2018 California State Assembly 10th district election
Primary election
Party	Candidate	Votes	%
Democratic	Marc Levine (incumbent)	97,186	80.4
Democratic	Dan Monte	23,637	19.6
Total votes		120,823	100.0
General election
Democratic	Marc Levine (incumbent)	139,050	71.7
Democratic	Dan Monte	54,758	28.3
Total votes		193,808	100.0
Democratic hold			

=== 2016 ===
2016 California State Assembly 10th district election
Primary election
Party	Candidate	Votes	%
Democratic	Marc Levine (incumbent)	100,578	65.4
Democratic	Veronica "Roni" Jacobi	27,232	17.7
Republican	Gregory Allen	26,081	16.9
Total votes		153,891	100.0
General election
Democratic	Marc Levine (incumbent)	140,207	68.2
Democratic	Veronica "Roni" Jacobi	65,355	31.8
Total votes		205,562	100.0
Democratic hold			

=== 2014 ===
2014 California State Assembly 10th district election
Primary election
Party	Candidate	Votes	%
Democratic	Marc Levine (incumbent)	45,597	49.2
Republican	Gregory Allen	18,705	20.2
Democratic	Diana M. Conti	16,644	18.0
Democratic	Erin Carlstrom	7,092	7.7
Democratic	Veronica "Roni" Jacobi	4,593	5.0
Total votes		92,631	100.0
General election
Democratic	Marc Levine (incumbent)	105,636	74.6
Republican	Gregory Allen	35,999	25.4
Total votes		141,635	100.0
Democratic hold			

=== 2012 ===
2012 California State Assembly 10th district election
Primary election
Party	Candidate	Votes	%
Democratic	Michael Allen (incumbent)	32,922	31.0
Democratic	Marc Levine	25,920	24.4
Republican	Peter J. Mancus	22,708	21.4
Democratic	Connie Wong	11,371	10.7
Democratic	Alex Easton-Brown	6,563	6.2
No party preference	Joe Boswell	4,544	4.3
Democratic	H. Christian Gunderson	2,323	2.2
Total votes		106,351	100.0
General election
Democratic	Marc Levine	96,421	51.2
Democratic	Michael Allen (incumbent)	91,973	48.8
Total votes		188,394	100.0
Democratic hold			

=== 2010 ===
2010 California State Assembly 10th district election
Party	Candidate	Votes	%
Democratic	Alyson Huber (incumbent)	83,177	52.0
Republican	Jack Sieglock	68,395	42.7
Libertarian	Janice Marlae Bonser	5,286	3.2
Peace and Freedom	Albert R. Troyer	3,368	2.1
Total votes		160,226	100.0
Democratic hold			

=== 2008 ===
2008 California State Assembly 10th district election
Party	Candidate	Votes	%
Democratic	Alyson Huber	88,242	46.7
Republican	Jack Sieglock	87,768	46.4
Libertarian	Janice Bonser	13,096	6.9
Total votes		189,106	100.0
Democratic gain from Republican			

=== 2006 ===
2006 California State Assembly 10th district election
Party	Candidate	Votes	%
Republican	Alan Nakanishi (incumbent)	84,455	60.8
Democratic	Jim Cook	46,858	33.7
Libertarian	Janice Bonser	4,636	3.3
Peace and Freedom	Albert Troyer	1,974	1.4
Total votes		138,923	100.0
Republican hold			

=== 2004 ===
2004 California State Assembly 10th district election
Party	Candidate	Votes	%
Republican	Alan Nakanishi (incumbent)	121,741	75.6
Libertarian	Cullene Lang	39,208	24.4
Total votes		160,949	100.0
Republican hold			

=== 2002 ===
2002 California State Assembly 10th district election
Party	Candidate	Votes	%
Republican	Alan Nakanishi	72,302	60.2
Democratic	Katherine E. Maestas	47,904	39.8
Total votes		119,534	100.0
Republican hold			

=== 2000 ===
2000 California State Assembly 10th district election
Party	Candidate	Votes	%
Republican	Anthony Pescetti (incumbent)	92,196	53.5
Democratic	Debra Gravert	73,505	42.7
Libertarian	Tom Kohlhepp	6,605	3.8
Total votes		172,306	100.0
Republican hold			

=== 1998 ===
1998 California State Assembly 10th district election
Party	Candidate	Votes	%
Republican	Anthony Pescetti	67,535	48.7
Democratic	Debra Gravert	67,249	48.5
Libertarian	Tom Kohlhepp	3,960	2.9
Total votes		138,744	100.0
Republican hold			

=== 1996 ===
1996 California State Assembly 10th district election
Party	Candidate	Votes	%
Republican	Larry Bowler	76,654	48.9
Democratic	Matt Moretti	70,336	44.9
Reform	J. Bolton Phillips	9,691	6.2
Total votes		156,681	100.0
Republican hold			

=== 1994 ===
1994 California State Assembly 10th district election
Party	Candidate	Votes	%
Republican	Larry Bowler (incumbent)	78,831	58.7
Democratic	T. Kathleen Wishnick	50,609	37.7
American Independent	John Rakus	4,911	3.7
Total votes		134,351	100.0
Republican hold			

=== 1992 ===
1992 California State Assembly 10th district election
Party	Candidate	Votes	%
Republican	Larry Bowler	89,449	53.11
Democratic	Kay Albiani	70,731	42.0
American Independent	Stephen M. Delany	4,459	2.6
Libertarian	Joseph S. Farina	3,798	2.3
Total votes		168,437	100.0
Republican gain from Democratic			

=== 1990 ===
1990 California State Assembly 10th district election
Party	Candidate	Votes	%
Democratic	Phillip Isenberg (incumbent)	69,138	56.0
Republican	Tom Griffen	47,377	38.4
Libertarian	Chris J. Rufer	6,870	5.6
Total votes		123,385	100.0
Democratic hold			

== See also ==
- California State Assembly
- California State Assembly districts
- Districts in California
