= R. Burnett Miller =

American politician (1923–2018)

Robert Burnett Miller (September 2, 1923 – October 14, 2018) was an American politician who served as Mayor of Sacramento, California, in 1982.

== Biography ==
Miller was born on September 2, 1923, in Sacramento, California, where his father was in the lumber business. He joined the ROTC at Santa Clara College in 1941. He fought in the Battle of the Bulge and was with the U.S. 11th Armored Division when it liberated the Mauthausen concentration camp in Austria on May 6, 1945. The final episode of Ken Burns' documentary The War features Miller's harrowing eyewitness account of encountering the Holocaust at Mauthausen.

Miller served on the Sacramento City Council from 1971 to 1977. He then served as mayor of Sacramento, California in 1982. Miller died at his home on October 14, 2018, at the age of 95.

Political offices
Preceded by Phil Isenberg	Mayor of Sacramento, California; 1982–1982	Succeeded by Anne Rudin
