= Alyson Lewis =

American politician

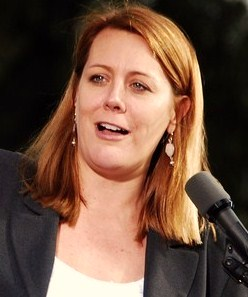

Member of the California State Assembly from the 10th district
- In office December 1, 2008 – November 30, 2012
- Preceded by: Alan Nakanishi
- Succeeded by: Marc Levine

Personal details
- Born: Alyson Lewis; March 1, 1972 (age 54) Fremont, California
- Party: Democratic
- Spouse: Tim Huber (divorced 2012)
- Children: 2
- Education: Cornell University; UC Hastings College of the Law
- Occupation: politician
- Profession: Attorney

Alyson Lewis (formerly Huber, born March 1, 1972) is an American politician who served in the California State Assembly from 2008 to 2012. She is currently a judge of the Superior Court of Sacramento County in California for a term that expires in January 2027. She is a Democrat.

== Career ==
=== Political ===
In 2008 Lewis ran for the California State Assembly to represent the 10th district. She ran under her married name, Huber. For over three weeks after the November general election, Lewis was behind in the vote count; however, after provisional ballots from Sacramento County were counted, she was declared the winner on November 26, 2008. The final count showed she had defeated Jack Sieglock, a Republican and a San Joaquin County Supervisor, by 474 votes. Sieglock had already attended the orientation for new Assembly members when he learned he hadn't won.

In 2010, Sieglock unsuccessfully challenged Lewis, who again ran under her married name Huber, for the same seat. Lewis won the election with 52.0% of the vote, with Sieglock garnering only 42.7%.

Although she had initially planned on seeking reelection in 2012, Lewis ultimately declined to run due to her pending divorce and the redrawing of her district lines.

=== Legal ===
On December 27, 2012, Lewis was appointed by Governor Jerry Brown to serve as a judge on the Sacramento Superior Court.

== Education ==
In 1990, Lewis graduated from Lodi High School in Lodi, California.

She started her college career at San Joaquin Delta College in Stockton, transferring to California State University, Chico and then to Cornell University in Ithaca, New York, where she received her undergraduate degree.

Lewis received her Juris Doctor degree from the University of California, Hastings College of the Law, San Francisco.

== Personal ==
Lewis was married to Tim Huber. The couple has two sons: Riley, born circa 2003, and Colin, born circa 2005. She separated from Tim in January 2011 and filed for divorce in May. While she was married to Huber, Lewis was step-mother to Tim's two children from a previous relationship.

== Awards and honors ==
Lewis was named 2010's "Legislator of the Year" by the California Small Business Association. In 2009, the California State Sheriff's Association recognized her as an "Outstanding Legislator".
