= Robert B. McPherson =

American politician

Member of the California State Assembly from the 10th district
- In office January 3, 1921 – January 7, 1929
- Preceded by: Oscar W. Hilton
- Succeeded by: Ernest C. Crowley

Personal details
- Born: December 26, 1891 Calistoga, California, U.S.
- Died: May 13, 1947 (aged 55)
- Party: Republican
- Spouse: Edna Gunderson
- Children: 1
- Education: University of California

Military service
- Allegiance: United States
- Branch/service: United States Army
- Battles/wars: World War I

Robert Bruce McPherson Sr (December 26, 1891 – May 13, 1947) served in the California State Assembly for the 10th district from January 3, 1921 – January 7, 1929. During World War I he also served in the United States Army.
