= Phillip Isenberg =

American politician (1939–2023)

Phillip L. Isenberg

Member of the California State Assembly
- In office December 6, 1982 – November 30, 1996
- Preceded by: William P. Baker
- Succeeded by: Deborah Ortiz
- Constituency: 9th district (1992–1996); 10th district (1982–1992)

Personal details
- Born: February 25, 1939 Gary, Indiana, U.S.
- Died: October 26, 2023 (aged 84)
- Party: Democratic
- Spouse: Marilyn Y. Araki (after 1963)
- Education: California State University, Sacramento, (1967)
- Profession: Lawyer

Phillip L. Isenberg (February 25, 1939 – October 26, 2023) was an American politician. A member of the Democratic Party, he was mayor of Sacramento, California, from 1975 to 1982. He also served in the California State Assembly from 1982 to 1996. He represented the city of Sacramento and surrounding areas.

== Political career ==
Prior to his service in the Assembly, he was mayor of Sacramento from 1975 until 1982. Isenberg was known as a budget expert while serving in the Assembly.

During his tenure in the Legislature, Isenberg served as Chair of the Assembly Judiciary Committee (1989–96) and Assistant Speaker pro Tempore (1986–88). He served on the following standing Assembly committees: Health (1982–94), Water, Parks & Wildlife (1982–93), Judiciary (1986–96), Revenue & Taxation (1987–94), Rules (1984–88), Ways and Means (1986–88), Housing & Community Development (1995–96), Elections, Reapportionment & Constitutional Amendments (1988–90), Consumer Protection, Governmental Efficiency & Economic Development (1995–96), Banking & Finance (1995–96), Public Safety (1994) and Utilities & Commerce (1996).

In 1998, Isenberg was one of three individuals selected by Governor-elect Gray Davis to help prepare his 1999-2000 budget. He performed the same function in 2001 and again in 2002. He chaired the transition committee for Treasurer-elect Phil Angelides in 1998 and in 1996 chaired the transition committee for Speaker-elect Cruz Bustamante.

== Teaching career ==
Isenberg taught public policy development and budget and fiscal policy at the McGeorge School of Law, and previously at the Goldman School of Public Policy at UC Berkeley and the Graduate School of Public Policy, California State University, Sacramento.

== Board memberships ==
Isenberg served as the vice-president of WEAVE (Women Escaping a Violent Environment) which is located in Sacramento. He was a member of the advisory board to California Lawyer magazine and the board of directors of 21st Century Insurance Company and Verge Center For The Arts.

In 2004, Isenberg became the chair of the Marine Life Protection Act Blue Ribbon Task Force, which is conducting a two-year study of how best to protect the oceans off California. Created by the Agency, with funding from the nonprofit Resources Legacy Fund Foundation, this program is part of the Arnold Schwarzenegger Administration's Oceans Initiative.

== Death ==
Phillip Isenberg died on October 26, 2023, at the age of 84.

Political offices
Preceded by Bill Filante	California State Assemblyman, 9th District; 1992–1996	Succeeded by Deborah Ortiz
Preceded by William P. Baker	California State Assemblyman, 10th District; 1982–1992	Succeeded by Larry Bowler
Preceded by Richard H. Marriott	Mayor of Sacramento, California; 1975–1982	Succeeded by R. Burnett Miller
