= Alan Nakanishi =

American politician

Alan Shinji Nakanishi

Member of the California State Assembly from the 10th district
- In office December 2, 2002 – November 30, 2008
- Preceded by: Anthony Pescetti
- Succeeded by: Alyson Huber

Personal details
- Born: March 21, 1940 (age 86) Sacramento, California, U.S.
- Party: Republican
- Spouse: Susan Nakanishi
- Children: 3
- Education: Pacific Union College; Loma Linda University; Virginia Commonwealth University
- Profession: Ophthalmologist

Alan Shinji Nakanishi (born March 21, 1940) is an American physician and politician who represented California's 10th State Assembly district in the California State Assembly from 2002 to 2008. He has also been a member in the City Council of Lodi, California, since 1998, and served four separate two-year terms as the city's mayor.

== Early life ==
Alan Nakanishi was born in Sacramento, California. At the age of two, he and his family were relocated to Tule Lake as part of the internment of Japanese Americans during World War II, where they spent three years. After the war, they returned to Sacramento. To make money while in school, Nakanishi worked picking fruit and stacking cans at a cannery. He left Sacramento after graduating high school, living in Napa County, Los Angeles, and Texas before settling in Lodi, California.

== Education ==
Nakanishi received a B.A. in chemistry from Pacific Union College in 1961. He went on to receive a master's degree in health administration from Virginia Commonwealth University, and an M.D. from Loma Linda University. He completed his medical internship at USC Medical Center.

== Military service ==
While living in Texas, Nakanishi served as a captain in the U.S. Army. He later became a major, leading a surgical department at McDonald Army Hospital. He also served as Chief of Ophthalmology from 1969 to 1971.

== Medical practice ==
Since 1971, Nakanishi has practiced medicine in Stockton. He is the co-founder of the Delta Eye Medical Group, an ophthalmology practice with offices throughout the San Joaquin Valley. He continued practicing in Lodi throughout his time in the State Assembly.

== Public service career ==
Nakanishi was first elected to the Lodi City Council in 1998 and was chosen as mayor in 2001, but left to represent the state's 10th Assembly district in the California State Assembly in 2002. As an Assemblymember, Nakanishi served as Vice Chair of the Health Committee. He was also a member of the Asian & Pacific Islander Legislative Caucus.

Nakanishi returned to Lodi in 2010 after a brief stint at the California State Board of Equalization, being elected once more to the city's council. He served four more terms as mayor, and his current and fifth term began in December 2023.

In 2000 and again in 2016 he also ran to represent California's 5th senatorial district in the California State Senate, but lost to Michael Machado and Cathleen Galgiani, respectively.

Political offices
Preceded by Anthony Pescetti	California State Assemblymember, 10th District; 2002–2008	Succeeded by Alyson Huber
