= Ernest C. Crowley =

American politician

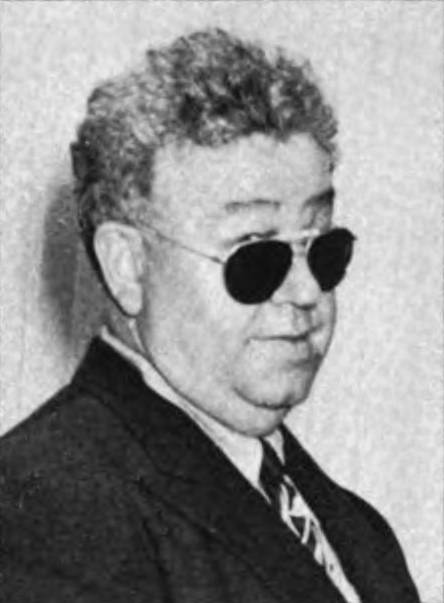
- Crowley c. 1950

Member of the California State Assembly
- In office January 7, 1929 – September 22, 1952
- Preceded by: Robert B. McPherson
- Succeeded by: Samuel R. Geddes
- Constituency: 10th district (1929-1933); 5th district (1933-1952)

Personal details
- Born: July 11, 1896 Suisun, California, U.S.
- Died: September 22, 1952 (aged 56)
- Party: Democratic
- Spouse: Georgia Herbert Crowley
- Children: 2
- Education: University of California (A.B.) (J.D.)
- Occupation: Lawyer

Ernest Charles Crowley (July 11, 1896 – September 22, 1952) served in the California State Assembly for the 10th district from 1929 to 1933, and the 5th district from 1933 to 1952. Crowley was blinded in a hunting accident when he was 11 years old. In the Assembly, he wrote legislation to provide pensions for the blind and to give those living in federal housing projects the right to vote.
