= Heather Fargo =

American politician (born 1952)

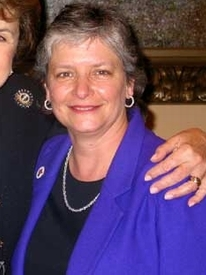

54th Mayor of Sacramento
- In office November 2000 – December 2008
- Preceded by: Jimmie R. Yee
- Succeeded by: Kevin Johnson

Member of the Sacramento City Council from the 1st district
- In office 1989–2000
- Preceded by: David Shore
- Succeeded by: Ray Tretheway

Personal details
- Born: December 12, 1952 (age 73) Oakland, California, U.S.
- Party: Democratic
- Education: University of California, Davis (BS)

Heather Fargo (born December 12, 1952) is an American politician who served as mayor and was a former City Council Member of Sacramento, California. She was sworn in as mayor in November 2000, replacing Jimmie R. Yee, and served until December 2008, when she was defeated for reelection by Kevin Johnson.

== Early life and education ==
Born in Oakland, California, Fargo grew up in Santa Maria and graduated from Stagg High School. She received a Bachelor of Science degree in environmental planning and management from the University of California, Davis in 1975. In 1981, Fargo earned a Certificate of Completion from the Revenue Sources Management School in Boulder, Colorado. She also completed the State and Local Government Executive Program at the John F. Kennedy School of Government at Harvard University in 1991.

== Career ==
Fargo was first elected to the Sacramento City Council in 1989 to a five-year term as Sacramento was transitioning to even year citywide elections. Fargo represented District One which includes Downtown and Natomas. In the September primary, she came in second place to businesswoman Kate Karpilow but beat future City Councilman Ray Tretheway who came in third place and incumbent David Shore who came in fourth place. However, Fargo came back to beat Karpilow in November.

Upon Grantland Johnson's resignation from the Sacramento County Board of Supervisors in 1994, Fargo decided to run for the Board. In that election, she faced attorney and community activist Roger Dickinson. In a closely fought election, Dickinson narrowly beat Fargo. After that loss she was re-elected in 1994 and 1998. While serving on the city council, (prior to becoming Mayor full-time), she was employed as a manager of the California State Parks Volunteer Program.

=== 2000 mayoral campaign ===
Upon the sudden death in November 1999 of Mayor Joe Serna, Jr., Land Park City Councilman Jimmie Yee became the acting mayor. Several candidates announced their intentions to run. Other than Fargo, three other council members were also seeking the mayorship. North Sacramento City Councilman Rob Kerth who represented an area immediately adjacent to Fargo's also decided to run. In addition, Steve Cohn, the city councilman for East Sacramento ran along with Robbie Waters who represents the Pocket and Greenhaven areas decided to run along with several lesser known candidates that included businessman and attorney Joe Genshlea and community activist Julie Padilla. Fargo, who won 22% of the vote in the primary and Kerth who won 20% of the vote made it into the November runoff, where Fargo was elected with just 53% of the vote. In winning, Fargo became the second elected mayor of Sacramento, and the first mayor from north of the American River .

=== 2004 mayoral campaign ===
Fargo did not face as stiff competition in her 2004 re-election. Her main opponent was Ross W. Relles, Jr., a businessman. Other candidates were Deputy Attorney General Mark Soble and Lorenzo Patino Law School President Leonard Padilla. Virtually unopposed against candidates far less funded, Fargo won solidly in the primary election, thus no runoff was necessary.

=== 2008 mayoral campaign ===
The primary election for mayor took place on June 3, 2008. Fargo received 39% of the vote, while former NBA star and Sacramento native Kevin Johnson received 46% of the vote. Since neither received a majority of the votes, a run off election was scheduled for November 2008, where she was defeated by a margin of 58% to 42%.

During the primary election campaign, Fargo initially claimed that she had the support of all the city councilmembers. Yet, Councilman Robbie Waters, Steve Cohn, and Sandra Sheedy all ended up endorsing Johnson during the primary. On September 4, 2008, only Councilman Kevin McCarty endorsed Heather Fargo.

== Political positions ==
=== Environment ===
Fargo was a founding member and the first secretary of the Sacramento Tree Foundation, which is considered an important voice in Sacramento's environmental community.

=== Gun control ===
During her tenure Mayor Fargo became a member of the Mayors Against Illegal Guns Coalition, an organization formed in 2006 and co-chaired by New York City mayor Michael Bloomberg and Boston mayor Thomas Menino.

=== Women's rights ===
Fargo is a long term advocate for women in politics. After she left office Fargo has continued to encourage women to run for office. Fargo is also active in promoting awareness about the history of women's suffrage.

== Mayoral tenure ==
Mayor Fargo's tenure as mayor included disagreements with the Maloof family, owners of the NBA's Sacramento Kings, over the building of a new arena.

In 2006, 2007, and 2008, Mayor Fargo was named "Best Local Elected Official" by the readers of Sacramento Magazine in their annual poll.

== Electoral history ==
=== 2000 primary election for mayor of Sacramento ===
Name	Percentage of the Vote
Heather Fargo	21.76%
Rob Kerth	20.19%
Robbie Waters	18.23%
Joe Genshlea	14.68%
Julie Padilla	11.68%
Steve Cohn	9.08%

=== 2000 general election for mayor of Sacramento ===
Name	Percentage of the Vote
Heather Fargo	54.07%
Rob Kerth	45.93%

=== 2004 primary election for mayor of Sacramento ===
Name	Percentage of the Vote
Heather Fargo	59.77%
Ross W. Relles, Jr.	20.91%
Mark Soble	11.54%
Leonard Padilla	7.78%

Because Fargo received a majority of the votes in the primary election, no general election was necessary.

=== 2008 primary election for mayor of Sacramento ===
Name	Percentage of the Vote
Kevin Johnson	46.58%
Heather Fargo	39.65%
Leonard Padilla	5.83%
Shawn D. Eldredge	3.44%
Muriel Strand	2.79%

Johnson and Fargo proceeded to a runoff election on November 5.

=== 2008 general election for mayor of Sacramento ===
Name	Percentage of the Vote
Kevin Johnson	54%
Heather Fargo	46%

Precincts Reporting - 215 out of 391

Political offices
Preceded by David Shore	Councilmember, Sacramento City Council, District 1; 1989–2000	Succeeded by Ray Tretheway
Preceded by Jimmie R. Yee	Mayor of Sacramento, California; 2000–2008	Succeeded by Kevin Johnson
