= Anne Rudin =

American politician (1924–2021)

51st Mayor of Sacramento
- In office 1983–1992
- Preceded by: R. Burnett Miller
- Succeeded by: Joe Serna, Jr.

Personal details
- Born: January 27, 1924
- Died: November 25, 2021 (aged 97)
- Party: Democratic
- Spouse: Edward Rudin
- Profession: Registered Nurse, Activist, Politician

Anne Rudin (January 27, 1924 – November 25, 2021) was an American politician who served as the 51st Mayor of Sacramento from her election in 1983 until she stepped down, after declining to seek a third term in 1992.

She was Sacramento's first elected female mayor.

== Background ==
Anne Rudin grew up in a working-class Italian American family in Philadelphia during the Great Depression. Rudin started her career as a registered nurse. She was also very active in the local and state League of Women Voters. Rudin was first elected to the Sacramento City Council in 1971.

She played a significant role in the whirlwind of change and growth that transformed Sacramento from a quiet government and agricultural town into a bustling, large city. She cast the lone vote against a controversial plan to develop North Natomas.

== Mayoralty ==
Rudin traveled to distant countries to speak of things not directly related to Sacramento but related to politics such as promoting world peace. She also used the influence of her office to fight for nuclear disarmament, affordable housing, gay rights, local anti-smoking laws, bans on assault weapons, and limits to campaign contributions.

During her time in office, she also pushed for the creation of the regional light-rail system.

== Later life and death ==
She was widowed by her husband, psychiatrist Edward Rudin, who died from prostate cancer on June 12, 2003. She was Jewish.

On August 12, 2005, the Japanese Ministry of Foreign Affairs awarded Rudin's Foreign Minister's Commendation, which was accompanied by an engraved silver cup, for her efforts in promoting bilateral relations between Japan and United States during her term as mayor.

Rudin died from pneumonia on November 25, 2021, at the age of 97.

Political offices
Preceded by R. Burnett Miller	Mayor of Sacramento, California; 1983–1992	Succeeded by Joe Serna
