= Stephanie Nguyen (politician) =

American politician (born 1979)

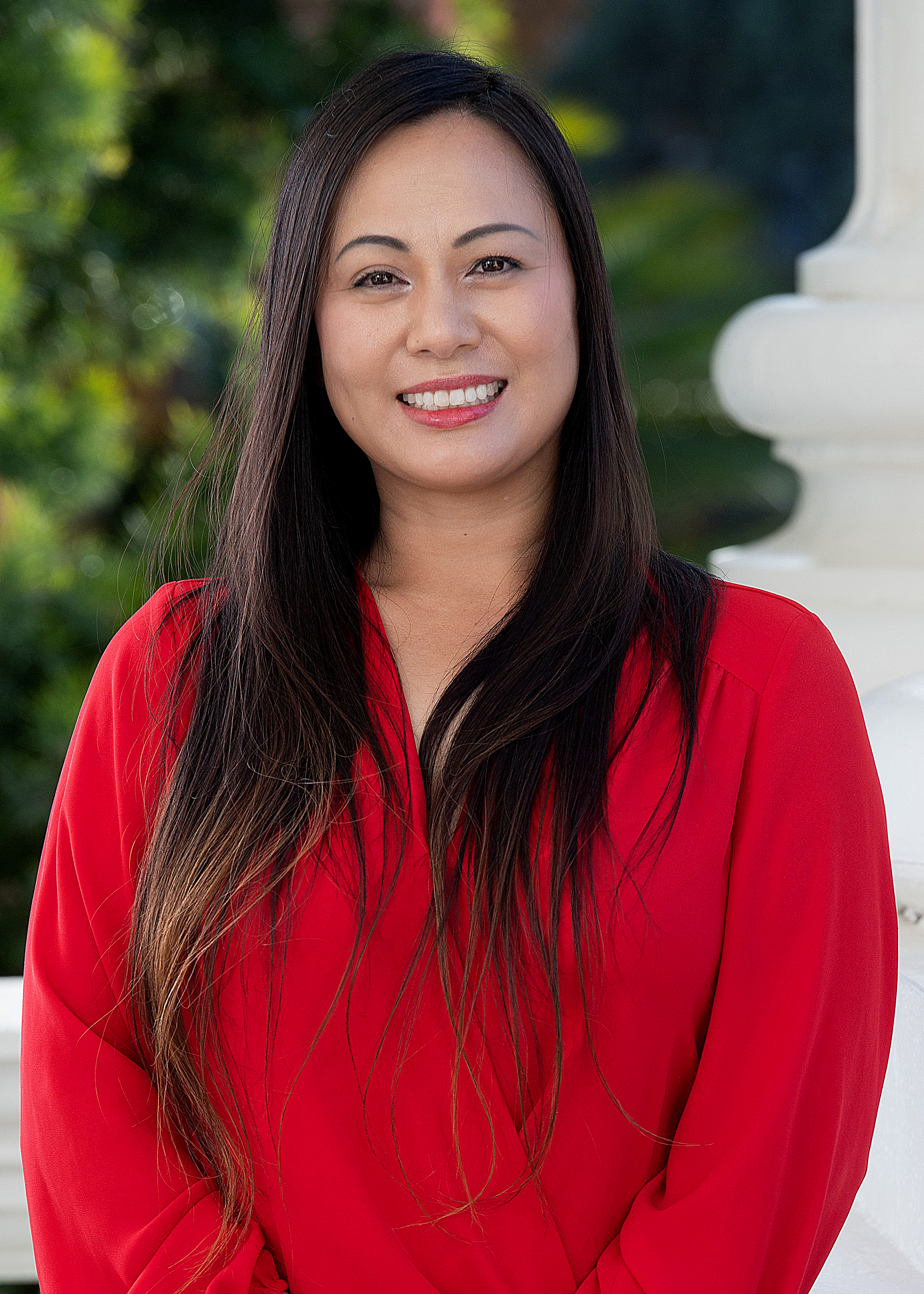

Member of the California State Assembly from the 10th district
- Incumbent
- Assumed office December 5, 2022
- Preceded by: Jim Cooper

Personal details
- Born: April 17, 1979 (age 47) United States
- Party: Democratic
- Education: Sacramento State University (BA)

Stephanie Nguyen (born April 17, 1979) is an American politician in the California State Assembly representing the 10th district. Elected in 2022, she previously served on the Elk Grove City Council after being appointed in 2017.

== Early life and education ==
Nguyen was born in the United States to refugees from Vietnam. She received a bachelor's degree in humanities from Sacramento State University, aspiring to be a teacher.

== Career ==
Nguyen previously served as executive director of Asian Resources Inc., a Sacramento-based nonprofit organization supporting Asian Americans and immigrants.

Nguyen was appointed to the Elk Grove City Council in 2017 after incumbent Steve Ly was elected mayor. She served through 2022, representing the 4th district.

== California Assembly ==
Nguyen was elected to the California State Assembly for the 10th district in 2022. The Sacramento County district includes Elk Grove, Florin, Vineyard and parts of Sacramento. The district, previously numbered the 9th district, was represented by Democrat Jim Cooper who retired to run for Sheriff of Sacramento County.

She placed first in the nonpartisan blanket primary with 29.9% of the vote, advancing to the general election alongside fellow Democrat and Sacramento City Councilmember Eric Guerra. She defeated Guerra in the general election with 53.8% of the vote. Oil interests reportedly spent $979,000 supporting Nguyen through independent expenditures.

== Personal life ==
Nguyen lives in Elk Grove with her husband, a police officer, and their two daughters. Stephanie grew up with six siblings.

== Electoral history ==
=== Elk Grove City Council ===
2018 Elk Grove City Council 4th district election
Candidate	Votes	%
Stephanie Nguyen	34,502	64.9
Orlando Fuentes	18,683	35.1
Write-in	7	0.0
Total votes	53,192	100.0

=== California State Assembly ===
2022 California State Assembly 10th district election
Primary election
Party	Candidate	Votes	%
Democratic	Stephanie Nguyen	26,652	29.9
Democratic	Eric Guerra	26,193	29.4
Republican	Eric M. Rigard	24,293	27.3
Democratic	Tecoy Porter	7,632	8.6
Democratic	Ben Thompkins	4,291	4.8
Total votes		89,061	100.0
General election
Democratic	Stephanie Nguyen	63,570	53.8
Democratic	Eric Guerra	54,595	46.2
Total votes		118,165	100.0
Democratic hold			

2024 California State Assembly 10th district election
Primary election
Party	Candidate	Votes	%
Democratic	Stephanie Nguyen (incumbent)	59,646	67.6
Republican	Vinaya Singh	28,630	32.4
Total votes		88,276	100.0
General election
Democratic	Stephanie Nguyen (incumbent)	124,509	67.6
Republican	Vinaya Singh	59,665	32.4
Total votes		184,174	100.0
Democratic hold			
