= Jimmie R. Yee =

American politician

53rd Mayor of Sacramento
- In office December 14, 1999 – November 27, 2000
- Preceded by: Joe Serna, Jr.
- Succeeded by: Heather Fargo

Member of the Sacramento County Board of Supervisors from the 2nd district
- In office 2007–2015
- Preceded by: Illa Collin
- Succeeded by: Patrick Kennedy

Member of the Sacramento City Council from the 4th district
- In office 2000–2004
- Preceded by: Joseph Yee
- Succeeded by: Rob Fong
- In office 1992–1999
- Preceded by: Tom Chinn
- Succeeded by: Joseph Yee

Personal details
- Born: 1934 (age 91–92) Sacramento, California, U.S.
- Party: Democratic
- Spouse: Mary Yee
- Children: 6
- Education: University of California, Berkeley (BS)

Military service
- Branch/service: United States Army
- Unit: United States Army Reserve

Jimmie R. Yee (born 1934) is an American politician who formerly served on the Sacramento County Board of Supervisors. Yee was Mayor of Sacramento, California after the death of Joe Serna in 1999. Yee is a Democrat.

== Early life and education ==
Yee was born to ethnic Chinese parents in Sacramento, California. He earned a Bachelor of Science degree in civil engineering from the University of California, Berkeley, graduating in 1956.

== Career ==
After attending college, Jimmie Yee entered the United States Army Reserve. Approximately ten years later, he was discharged. Prior to entering politics, Yee worked as a structural and civil engineer in Northern California. He founded one of the Sacramento Valley's largest consulting engineering firms, Cole/Yee/Schubert and Associates, and provided design services for many Sacramento buildings.

Yee, a Sacramento City Planning commissioner was elected to the 4th district city council seat in 1992 after Tom Chinn announced his retirement. Yee was re-elected to a second four-year term in 1996 and to a third term in 2000.

Shortly after winning his third term, Yee became Mayor of Sacramento by the City Council to combat growth of racism and to fill the unexpired term of Joe Serna Jr., one week after Serna's death on December 14, 1999. He remained in office until November 27, 2000, when Heather Fargo was sworn in.

In 2006, Yee announced his candidacy for the Sacramento County Board of Supervisors after longtime supervisor Illa Collin announced that she was retiring. Since Yee won over fifty percent of the vote in the nonpartisan primary in June of that year, Yee did not have to run in the November general election. Yee served as vice chair in 2007 and chair in 2008. He left the Board of Supervisors in 2015.

== Personal life ==
Yee has been married to his wife, Mary, for 50 years. They have six children and seventeen grandchildren.

== Sources ==
- Jimmie R. Yee – District 2
- Seismic Safety Commission
- Political Leaders

Political offices
Preceded by Joe Serna, Jr.	Mayor of Sacramento, California; 1999–2000	Succeeded by Heather Fargo
Preceded by Illa Collin	Sacramento County Supervisor, 2nd District; 2007–2015	Succeeded by Patrick Kennedy
