= Joe Serna Jr. =

American politician

- Joe Serna silhouetted by Sacramento's skyline

52nd Mayor of Sacramento
- In office January 2, 1993 – November 7, 1999
- Preceded by: Anne Rudin
- Succeeded by: Jimmie Yee

Personal details
- Born: September 3, 1939 Stockton, California, U.S.
- Died: November 7, 1999 (aged 60) Sacramento, California, U.S.
- Cause of death: Kidney cancer
- Resting place: East Lawn Cemetery, Sacramento, California
- Party: Democratic
- Spouse: Isabel Hernandez
- Profession: Activist, educator, politician

Joe Serna Jr. (September 3, 1939 – November 7, 1999) was an American educator and civil rights activist who served as the 52nd mayor of Sacramento, California from 1992 until his death in 1999.

== Early life ==
Joe Serna Jr. was born in Stockton, the son of migrant farm workers. He was raised in labor camps near Lodi and worked with his family in the fields at a young age. He graduated from what was then known as Sacramento State College in 1966.

== Activism ==
He would grow up to become a supporter of the United Farm Workers and worked with César Chávez. Serna organized clothing and food drives for striking farm workers in the 1960s and was one of the UFW's main Sacramento leaders for close to 30 years. Serna was also a sometime member of the Royal Chicano Air Force.

== Public career ==
Serna became the first Latino mayor of Sacramento. Before becoming mayor, Serna had served 11 years on the Sacramento City Council. He also served in the Peace Corps and was a professor in the Government Department at California State University Sacramento.

As mayor, Serna pushed through initiatives to honor César Chávez when the legendary civil rights leader died in 1993. Serna organized a caravan from Sacramento to march in Chávez's funeral and renamed a park in front of City Hall to Cesar E. Chavez Plaza. Furthermore, Sacramento became the first city in the United States to honor César Chávez with a holiday.

== Legacy ==
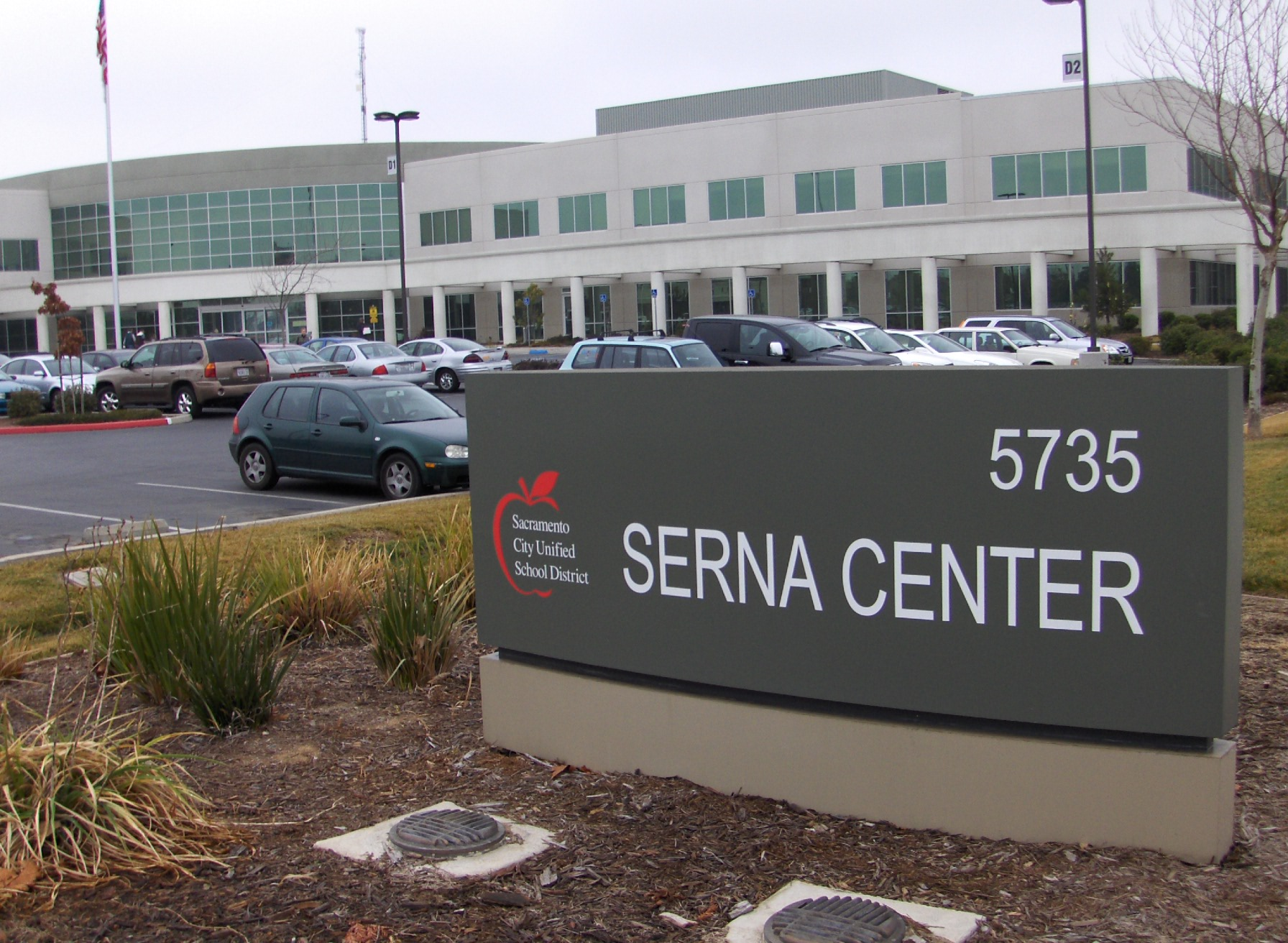
Joe Serna, Jr. and Isabel Hernandez-Serna Center at the Sacramento City Unified School District.

Serna died of kidney cancer on November 7, 1999, aged 60, while in office in Sacramento, California; Jimmie R. Yee presided over the remainder of his term. Serna is buried at East Lawn Cemetery, and his funeral was attended by many of his fellow UFW activists.

Serna was honored in 2001 with a brand-new, 25-story skyscraper named after him. The Joe Serna, Jr. EPA Building (near City Hall in downtown Sacramento) has been named the most energy-efficient high rise in the United States by Energy Star. Many California universities and organizations have also established scholarships and grants in Joe Serna's name. Joe Serna, Jr. Charter School, the only Spanish/English dual-immersion school in Lodi, carries out Serna's legacy of giving all people the opportunity to have their voices heard.

Sacramento City Unified School District honored Serna by naming their new headquarters, residing on 47th Avenue, after him.

California State University, Sacramento founded El Centro Serna, a resource center for Latino and Latina students.

Serna is also, to date, the most recent mayor of Sacramento to eulogize a former California governor, delivering the final remarks at the funeral mass of Pat Brown in 1996 at the Blessed Sacrament Cathedral, which was presided over by then-governor Pete Wilson, whose term also ended in 1999, and celebrated by then-Bishop William Weigand. Serna's eulogy was in Spanish and English.

Joe Serna was also honored with apartments in his name. This place is known as Serna Village Apartments in McClellan Park, California.

Political offices
Preceded by Anne Rudin	Mayor of Sacramento, California; 1993–1999	Succeeded by Jimmie R. Yee
