= List of Sacramento State people =

This is a list of encyclopedic persons (students, alumni, faculty, staff, or academic affiliates) associated with California State University, Sacramento (Sacramento State).

== Alumni ==
=== Arts ===
==== Television and movies ====
- Carlos Alazraqui – actor, comedian – Reno 911!
- Jeffrey Boam (B.A. in Art) – screenwriter, producer
- Creed Bratton – actor, The Office
- Butterscotch, finalist, America's Got Talent, season 2
- Kurt Caceres – actor
- Joe Carnahan (B.A. in Filmography) – film director, Smokin' Aces, The A-Team
- Ryan Coogler (BS in Business Administration (Finance)) – director of 2015 film Creed and Black Panther
- Matt Dearborn – creator of Even Stevens
- Giselle Fernández (B.A. in Journalism and Government) – former KTLA Morning News anchor
- Joseph Gutheinz (B.A. and M.A. in Criminal Justice) – retired attorney, appears in documentaries Moon for Sale and The Case of the Missing Moon Rocks
- Tom Hanks – Academy Award-winning film actor, director and producer
- Kristine Hanson (B.A. Communications, 1974) – television broadcaster, Playboy Playmate of the Month
- Joanna Hernandez – season one of the Bad Girls Club and winner of season one of For the Love of Ray J
- Lester Holt (B.A. Government) – anchor for flagship broadcast NBC Nightly News, host of Dateline and co-anchor of weekend edition of Today
- Karen Kilgariff – co-host of podcast My Favorite Murder, former head writer of The Ellen DeGeneres Show and The Rosie Show
- Kayden Kross – adult film actress
- Joan Lunden (formerly known as Joanie Blunden) (B.A. Liberal Arts) – television personality, former co-host of Good Morning America
- Bridget Marquardt (B.A. Public Relations, 1998) – girlfriend of Hugh Hefner, featured on E! TV show The Girls Next Door
- Brian Posehn – stand-up comedian
- Rick Rossovich – actor, The Terminator, Top Gun, Roxanne
- Billy Marshall Stoneking (B.A. English, minor Philosophy, 1970) – Australian/American poet, filmmaker, writer, script editor and teacher
- Graham Streeter (BA Japanese and Business Administration) – screenwriter, film director
- Rene Syler (BA Psychology, 1987) – television personality, former host of The Early Show on CBS
- Shauvon Torres – cast member of The Real World, Sydney

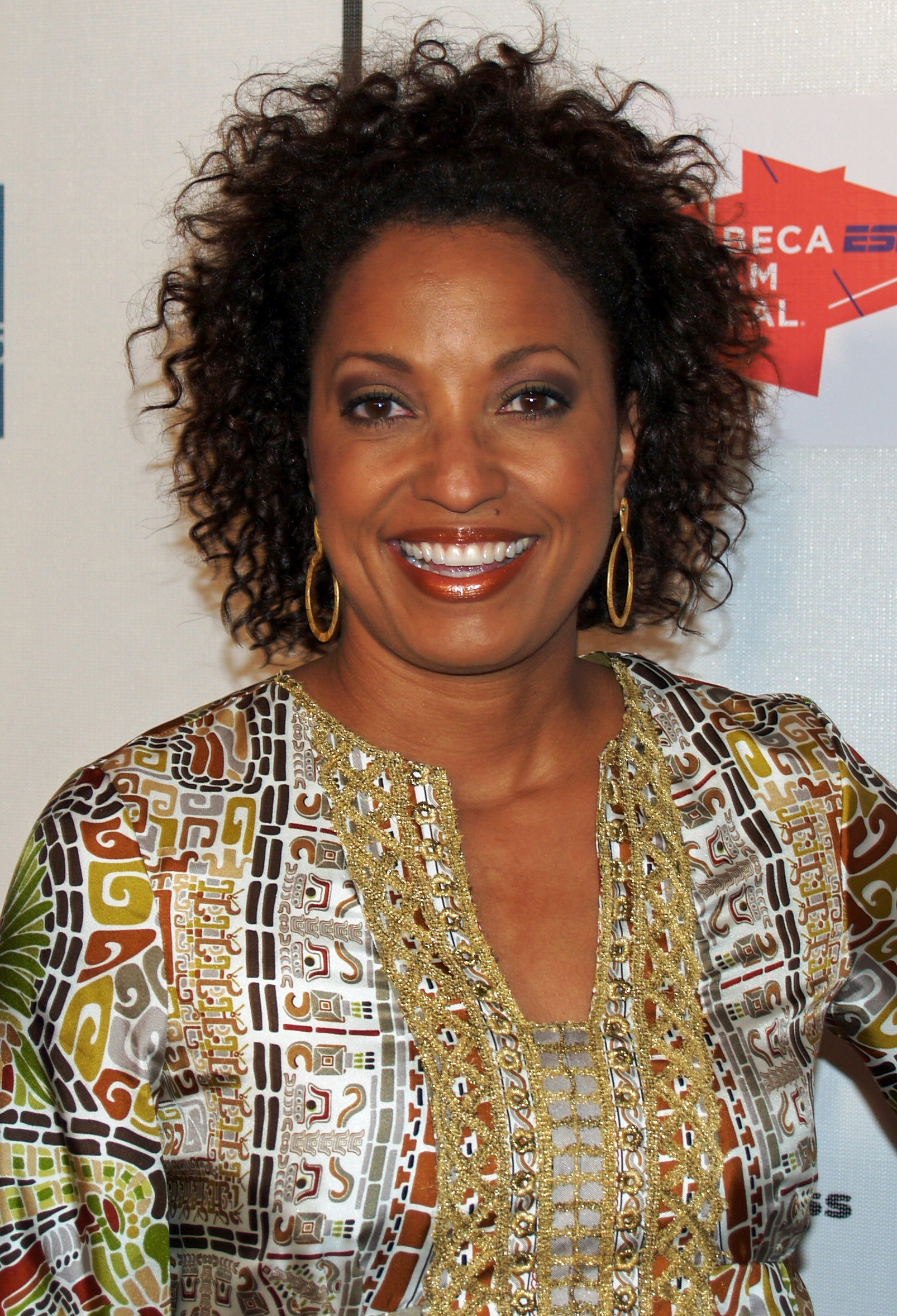
Rene Syler

==== Musicians ====
- Chi Cheng – bassist
- David Hodo (B.A. in Speech, 1969) – member of Village People
- Richard Maloof – musician
- Bobby McFerrin – composer and Grammy Award-winning musician ("Don't Worry, Be Happy")
- Charlie Peacock – singer
- Steve Turre – musician on Saturday Night Live
- Only Won – actor, rapper

==== Fine artists ====
- Fred Uhl Ball (BA and MA Art) – enamelist
- Jack Cassinetto (BA Art and English, 1966) – plein air painter
- Michael Patrick Cronan (BA Fine Arts 1974) – graphic designer and artist
- Xiomara De Oliver (BA 1988) – Canadian Black painter
- Mel Ramos (BA and MA, 1957) – artist
- Fritz Scholder (BA 1960) – Native American artist
- Wayne Thiebaud – artist and painter

==== Video games ====
- Matthew Griffin - game designer and marketer

=== Politicians and government ===
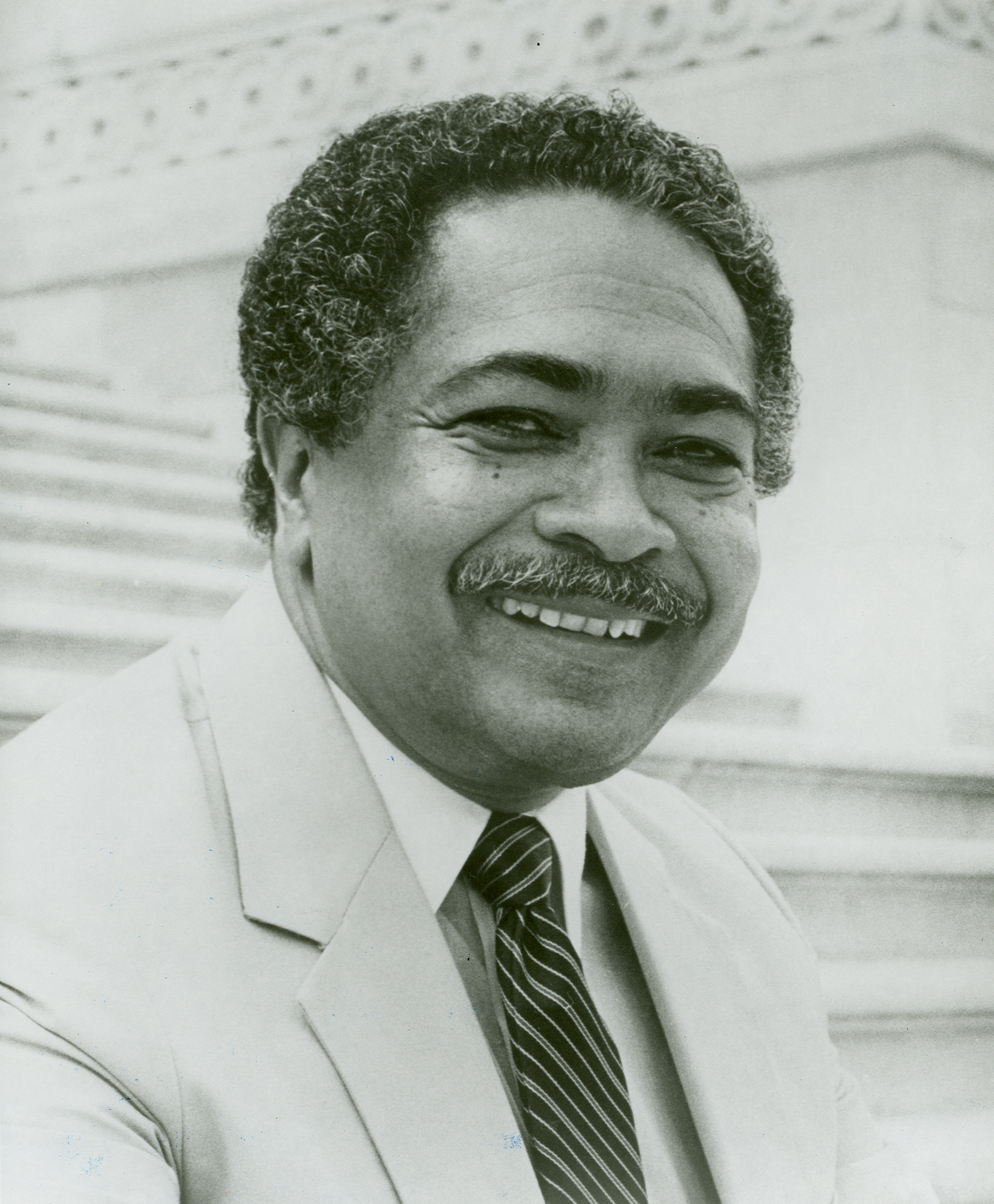
Mervyn M. Dymally, former Lt. Governor

- Janice Rogers Brown – Federal Appeals Court judge
- Christopher Cabaldon (Master's Public Policy and Administration 1994) – West Sacramento mayor
- Edward Chavez – mayor of Stockton 2005–09
- Lloyd Connelly – Sacramento County judge
- Steven Cheung (did not graduate) – White House Communications Direction, 2025
- Ward Connerly (BA Government, 1962) – former University of California regent and political activist
- Mervyn Dymally (MA Government) – lieutenant governor of California 1975–79, U.S. representative 1981–93, assemblyman 2002–08
- Bill Emmerson – California state senator
- Noreen Evans – California state assemblywoman
- Victor H. Fazio – U.S. congressman 1979–99
- Bradford Fenocchio (BA Criminal Justice) – Placer County district attorney
- Cathleen Galgiani – California state assemblywoman
- Wally Herger – U.S. congressman 1987–2013
- Karen Humphrey (MA Public Policy and Women's Studies) – mayor of Fresno 1989–93
- Phil Isenberg – assemblyman 1982–96, mayor of Sacramento 1975–82
- Grantland Johnson – former California cabinet official
- Patrick Johnston – former California State Legislator
- Bill Leonard – former State Board of Equalization member and legislator
- Lloyd Levine – former California state assemblyman
- Daniel Logue – California state assemblyman
- Steve March – Oregon state representative (BA Social Science 1968)
- Kevin McCarthy – alumnus of school's Capital Fellows Program, U.S. congressman for California's 23rd congressional district
- Kevin McCarty (Master's Public Policy and Administration 2011) – California state assemblyman
- Cathy Mitchell – former acting California secretary of state
- Don Nottoli – Sacramento County supervisor, 5th district
- George A. Plescia – former California state assemblyman
- Richard Rainey – former California state senator
- Robert Rivas – Speaker of the California State Assembly
- Jan Scully – Sacramento County District Attorney
- Joe Serna – mayor of Sacramento 1992–99
- Frank Skartados – New York State Assemblyman, 2009–11 and 2013–18
- Lori Wilson – CA state assemblymember 2022–present

=== International politicians ===
- Fernando Chui – chief executive of Macau
- Rudolf Hommes – Colombian politician and academic
- Mahmoud Vaezi – chief of staff of the president of Iran

=== Business ===
- Dale Carlsen – Sleep Train Mattress Centers founder
- Doug Lipp (MA in International Business Communications) – consultant, speaker, author, CEO and president of G. Douglas Lipp & Associates
- Tracey Panek (MA in History) – historian and archivist
- Angelo Tsakopoulos (BA Government, BS Business Administration, honorary doctorate in Human Letters) – real estate mogul

=== Authors and academics ===
- Ann Bannon – lesbian pulp fiction author, professor
- JaNay Brown-Wood – children's book author
- Russ Buettner – Pulitzer Prize-winning journalist for The New York Times
- Raymond Carver – fiction author, poet, screenwriter
- Richard Ebeling (BA in Economics) – libertarian author, president of Foundation for Economic Education
- John Fund – political journalist, currently national-affairs reporter for National Review Online
- Chester Gorman – anthropologist
- Marisa Kelly (BA in 1986) – political scientist and president of Suffolk University in Boston, Massachusetts
- Janet Nichols Lynch – writer and professor
- Mary Mackey – fiction author, poet, screenwriter, and professor emeritus (English)
- Richard J. Maybury – economist and author on topics of international business, law, history, juris naturalism
- Laura Moriarty – poet and novelist
- Alan Reynolds – economist and author
- Tukufu Zuberi – professor and chairman of Sociology Department, University of Pennsylvania

=== Other notables ===
- Joseph James DeAngelo – the Golden State Killer
- Anthony Sadler – assisted in thwarting 2015 French train terror attack
- Maluseu Doris Tulifau – Samoan-American human rights activist

=== Athletes ===
==== Baseball ====
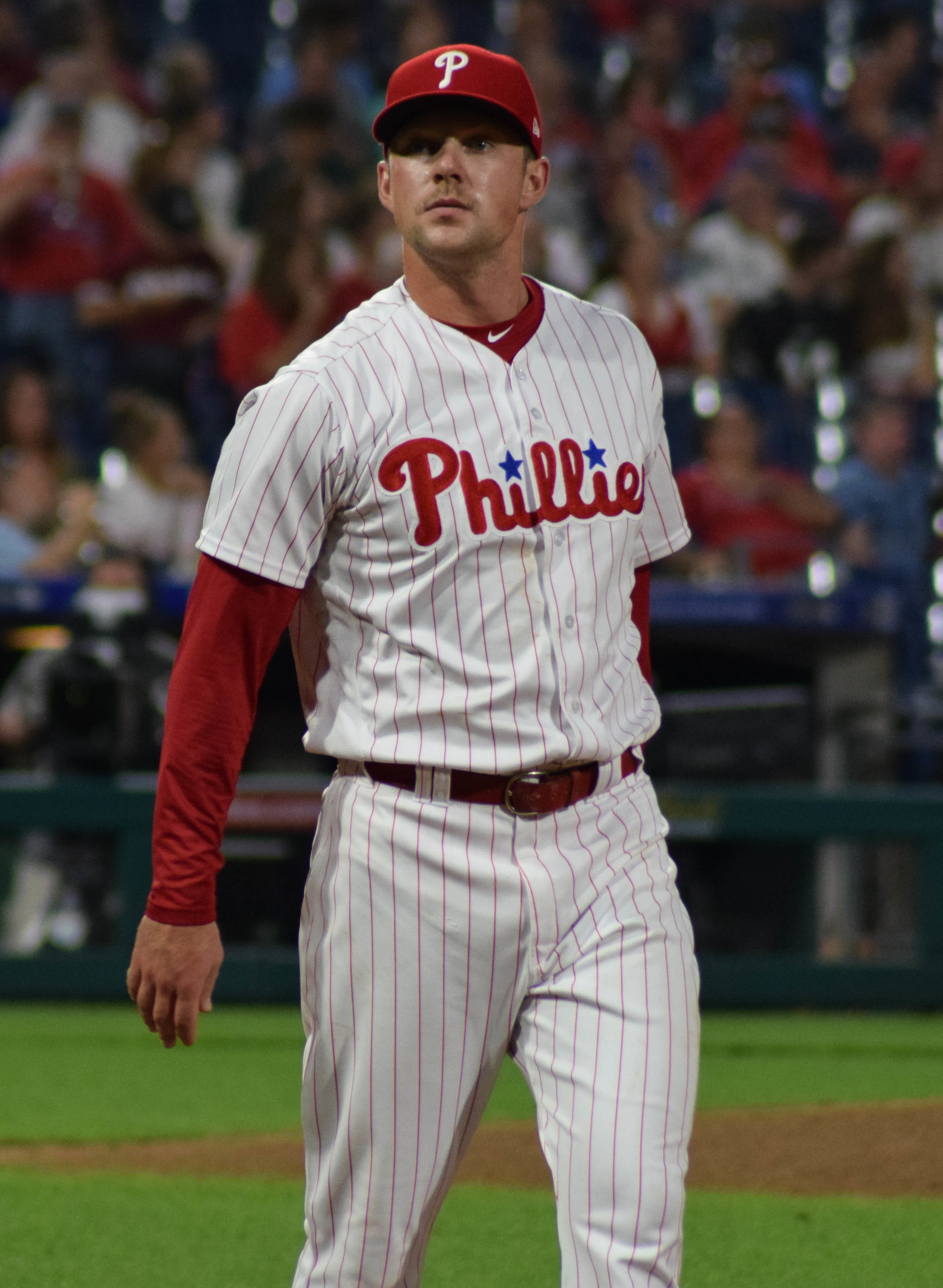
Rhys Hoskins

- Scott Burcham (born 1993) – American-Israeli baseball shortstop in the Colorado Rockies organization
- Rhys Hoskins (born 1993) – first baseman for the Philadelphia Phillies and Milwaukee Brewers
- Ethan Katz (born 1983) – pitching coach for the Chicago White Sox
- Sam Long (born 1995) – baseball pitcher for the San Francisco Giants and Oakland Athletics
- Nathan Lukes (born 1994) – outfielder for the Toronto Blue Jays
- Buck Martinez – 17-year MLB catcher and later an MLB manager
- Alyssa Nakken -– first female coach in Major League Baseball
- James Outman – outfielder for the Detroit Tigers
- Tim Wheeler (born 1988) – professional baseball player; was the 2011Texas League home run champion.

==== Basketball ====
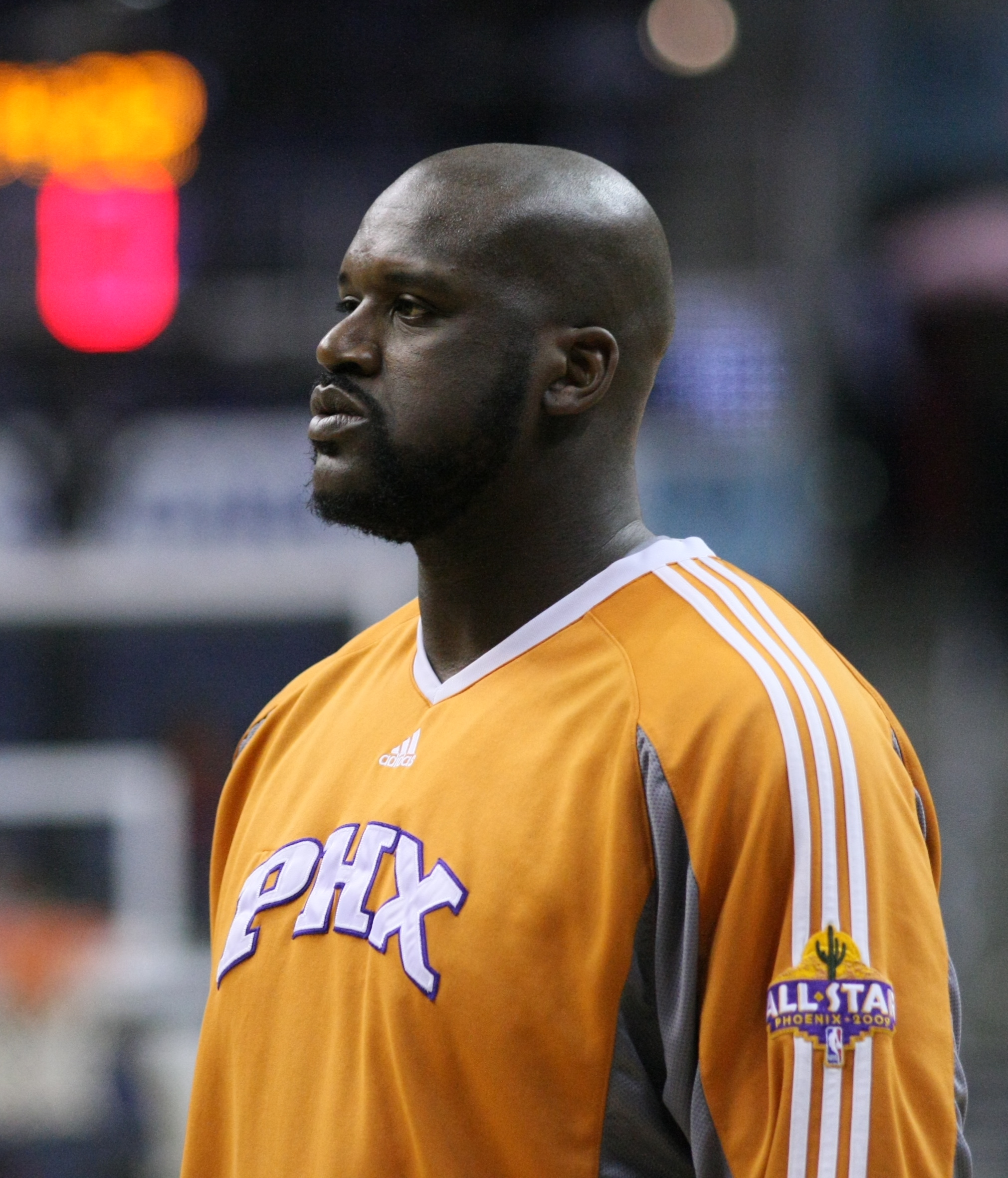
Shaquille O'Neal

- Mike Bibby (born 1978) – men's basketball head coach, 2025–present
- Cody Demps (born 1993) – basketball player for New Taipei CTBC DEA of the T1 League
- Nick Hornsby (born 1995) – basketball player for Eisbären Bremerhaven of the ProA
- Joel Jones (born 1981) – member of the Puerto Rican national basketball team
- Shaquille O'Neal (born 1972) – men's basketball general manager, 2025–present
- Joshua Patton (born 1997) – basketball player in the Israeli Basketball Premier League

==== Football ====
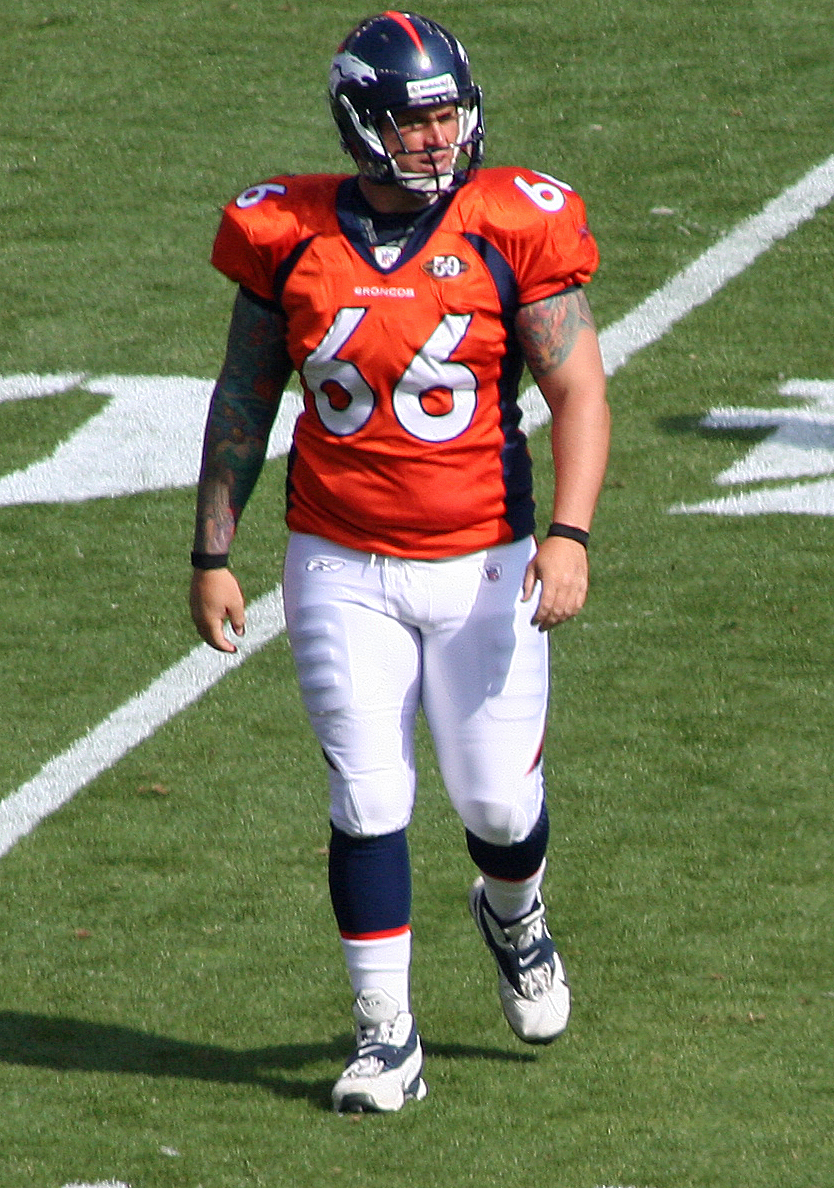
Lonie Paxton

- Otis Amey – wide receiver for San Francisco 49ers, Atlanta Falcons, Cleveland Gladiators, Austin Wranglers, Sacramento Mountain Lions
- McLeod Bethel-Thompson – quarterback for Minnesota Vikings
- DaRon Bland – NFL cornerback for the Dallas Cowboys; named First-team All-Pro and Pro Bowler in 2023, also led NFL in interceptions in 2023
- DeAndre Carter – NFL wide receiver for the Las Vegas Raiders, previously played for the Philadelphia Eagles, Houston Texans, Chicago Bears, Washington Football Team, and Los Angeles Chargers
- Mike Carter – former NFL wide receiver
- Marko Cavka – offensive lineman for Hamilton Tiger-Cats of Canadian Football League
- Dan Chamberlain – played for Buffalo Bills
- Elijah Dotson – NFL running back for the Los Angeles Chargers
- Jeff Fleming – former Sacramento State player
- Aaron Garcia – former Arena Football League quarterback
- John Gesek – former National Football League offensive lineman
- Tyronne Gross – running back for San Diego Chargers
- Cole Hikutini – tight end for the Michigan Panthers of the United Football League, previously played in the NFL for the San Francisco 49ers
- Jon Kirksey – defensive tackle, New Orleans Saints, St. Louis Rams
- Lorenzo Lynch – former NFL defensive back
- Marte Mapu – NFL linebacker for the New England Patriots, 2022 Big Sky Defensive Player of the Year
- Zack Nash – linebacker for Arizona Cardinals 2012
- Lonie Paxton – lineman for Denver Broncos
- Ricky Ray – quarterback for Toronto Argonauts of Canadian Football League
- Charles Roberts – running back for B.C. Lions of Canadian Football League
- Darnell Sankey – linebacker for the Montreal Alouettes of the Canadian Football League, previously played in the NFL for the Indianapolis Colts
- Kato Serwanga – NFL cornerback from 1998–2003
- Wasswa Serwanga – NFL cornerback from 1999–2003
- Daimon Shelton – nine-year NFL fullback
- Taylor Tappin – offensive lineman who played for the Ottawa Redblacks of the Canadian Football League
- Kevin Thomson – quarterback for the Hamilton Tiger-Cats of the Canadian Football League

Softball

- Alyssa Nakken – first female coach in MLB for the San Francisco Giants

==== Soccer ====
- Joe Enochs (born 1971) – former professional soccer player
- Benji Kikanović (born 2000) – Major League Soccer player
- Jamel Mitchell (born 1975) – Major League Soccer player

==== Sports figures (non-athletes) ====
- Darren Arbet – coach for San Jose SaberCats of AFL
- Clancy Barone – tight ends coach for Minnesota Vikings, offensive line coach for Denver Broncos
- Pat Doyle – baseball coach
- Brian Katz – Sacramento State men's basketball coach
- Greg Knapp – quarterbacks coach
- Mike Lange – sports broadcaster and member of Hockey Hall of Fame

== Faculty, staff, and other academics ==
=== Current ===
- Joseph Palermo – associate professor of history, author
- Mona L. Siegel – professor of history
- Stephanie Brown Trafton – athletics coach, Olympic gold medalist
- Michael G. Vann – professor of history
- J. Luke Wood – university president

=== Emeritus ===
- Ann Bannon – professor of English, associate dean in College of Arts and Sciences
- Paul Goldstene – professor of Government
- Stephen L. Harris – professor and chair of Humanities and Religious Studies
- Wes Jackson – professor of Environmental Sciences
- Frank Kofsky – professor of History
- Mary Mackey – professor of English and writer-in-residence
- Joe Serna, Jr. – professor of Government
- Miklos Udvardy – professor of Biological Sciences
- Angus Wright – professor of Environmental Sciences

=== Former ===
- Bob Barney – professor of physical education (1969–70)
- Peter Grandbois – professor of English 2006–2010
- Paul Carter Harrison – professor of Theatre (1970–1972)
- Enrique Herrscher – Fulbright Professor in Residence of Economics
- R. Joseph Hoffmann – professor of Humanities and Religious Studies
- Oliver Lee Jackson – professor in Pan African Studies, 1971 to 2002
- Joanne Marrow – professor of Psychology of Women and Human Sexuality, 1974–2000s
- Virginia Matzek – professor in Environmental Studies and Sciences
- Charles Postel – 2008 Bancroft Prize recipient and Frederick Jackson Turner Award recipient, professor of History

=== Adjunct ===
- Phil Isenberg – Graduate School of Public Policy
- Barry Keene – former state senator, professor of Government

=== Former administrators ===
- Alexander Gonzalez – former university president
- W. Lloyd Johns – former university president; president of Gallaudet University
- Jolene Koester – former professor of Communication Studies followed by provost; president of California State University, Northridge
- Robert S. Nelsen – former university president
