= 2026 Sacramento County Board of Supervisors election =

Local election in California

- June 2 (primary); November 3 (runoff)

3 of 5 seats on Sacramento County Board of Supervisors

The 2026 Sacramento County Board of Supervisors election took place on June 2, 2026, to elect three of the five seats of the Sacramento County Board of Supervisors, with runoff elections taking place on November 3, 2026. Runoffs only occurred if no candidate receives more than 50% of the votes cast in the contest. Local elections in California are officially nonpartisan. Each supervisor is elected to a four-year term, and does not have any term limits.

== District 1 ==
Incumbent Phil Serna was elected to the 1st district in 2010, 2014, 2018, and 2022. He was eligible for reelection, but chose not the run.

=== Endorsements ===
Eric Guerra

Local and state officials

- Deborah Ortiz, former member of the California State Legislature
- Phil Serna, incumbent member of the Sacramento County Board of Supervisors from the 1st district

Organizations

- CAIR Action (co-endorsement with Cofer)
- Sacramento Association of Realtors
- Sacramento Democratic Alliance
- UNAC/UHCP
- Vote for Peace (co-endorsement with Cofer)

Labor unions

- AFSCME Council 57
- IBEW Local 340
- UPTE-CWA Local 9119

Political party chapters

- Sacramento County Young Democrats
Flo Cofer

Newspapers

- The Sacramento Bee

Political party chapters

- Women Democrats Of Sacramento County
- Working Families Party

Organizations

- CAIR Action (co-endorsement with Guerra)
- Jane Fonda Climate PAC
- Our Revolution
- Vote for Peace (co-endorsement with Guerra)

Labor unions

- National Nurses United
- National Union of Healthcare Workers
- SEIU Committee of Interns and Residents
- SEIU Local 1021
- UAW Region 6

=== Results ===
2026 Sacramento County Board of Supervisors 1st district election
Primary election
Candidate	Votes	%
Flo Cofer	32,210	45.6
Eric Guerra	20,760	29.4
Deborah Ortiz	10,782	15.3
Tim Riley	6,852	9.7
Total votes	70,604	100.0
General election
Flo Cofer		
Eric Guerra		
Total votes		100.0

== District 2 ==
Incumbent Patrick Kennedy was elected to the 2nd district in 2014, 2018, and 2022. He was eligible for reelection.

=== Endorsements ===
Patrick Kennedy

Labor unions

- IBEW Local 340
- National Union of Healthcare Workers

Organizations

- Sacramento Association of Realtors
- Sacramento Democratic Alliance
- Sacramento Metropolitan Chamber of Commerce

Political party chapters

- Sacramento County Democratic Party

=== Results ===
2026 Sacramento County Board of Supervisors 2nd district election
Primary election
Candidate	Votes	%
Patrick Kennedy (incumbent)	31,866	63.9
Ronnie Bell	9,749	19.6
Brian Lajda	8,239	16.5
Total votes	49,854	100.0

== District 5 ==
Incumbent Pat Hume was elected to the 5th district in 2022 in the runoff with 50.2% of the vote. He was eligible for reelection.

=== Endorsements ===
Pat Hume

Organizations

- Sacramento Association of Realtors
- Sacramento County Deputy Sheriffs’ Association
- Sacramento Metropolitan Chamber of Commerce

=== Results ===
2026 Sacramento County Board of Supervisors 5th district election
Primary election
Candidate	Votes	%
Pat Hume (incumbent)	54,835	100.0
Total votes	54,835	100.0
