= Skartados =

Skartados (Greek: Σκαρτάδος) is a Greek surname. Notable people with the surname include:

- Frank Skartados (1956–2018), Greek American politician and businessman
- Georgios Skartados (born 1960), Greek footballer
