= Themistagoras of Ephesus =

Ancient Greek historian and geographer

Themistagoras of Ephesus (Ancient Greek: Θεμισταγόρας ο Εφέσιος) was an ancient Greek historian and geographer.

== Works ==
As his nickname suggests, he is said to have either been born or flourished in Ephesus, though the exact period of antiquity remains unspecified. He wrote the Golden Book, fragments of which have been preserved by Athenaeus, dealing with the nymph Elichrysis and the flower of the same name (Helichrysum). Another work attributed to Themistagoras of Ephesus is mentioned in the Great Etymological Dictionary concerning Samos and Astypalaia.

== Bibliography ==
- Μεγάλη Ελληνική Εγκυκλοπαίδεια / Great Greek Encyclopedia vol. ΙΒ', p.493
- Athenaeus, The Deipnosophists. C. D. Yonge, B.A., Ed. Perseus Digital Library
