= 2022 Sacramento County Board of Supervisors election =

Local election in California

- June 7 (primary); November 8 (runoff)

3 of 5 seats on Sacramento County Board of Supervisors

The 2022 Sacramento County Board of Supervisors election took place on June 7, 2022, to elect three of the five seats of the Sacramento County Board of Supervisors, with runoff elections taking place on November 8, 2022. Runoffs only occurred if no candidate receives more than 50% of the votes cast in the contest. Local elections in California are officially nonpartisan. Each supervisor is elected to a four-year term, and does not have any term limits.

== District 1 ==
Incumbent Phil Serna was elected to the 1st district in 2010, 2014, and 2018. He was eligible for reelection.

=== Results ===
2022 Sacramento County Board of Supervisors 1st district election
Primary election
Candidate	Votes	%
Phil Serna (incumbent)	44,656	100.0
Total votes	44,656	100.0

== District 2 ==
Incumbent Patrick Kennedy was elected to the 2nd district in 2014 and 2018. He was eligible for reelection.

=== Endorsements ===
Patrick Kennedy

Political party chapters

- Sacramento County Democratic Party

Newspapers

- The Sacramento Bee
Duke Cooney

Organizations

- Fem Dems of Sacramento

=== Results ===
2022 Sacramento County Board of Supervisors 2nd district election
Primary election
Candidate	Votes	%
Patrick Kennedy (incumbent)	32,005	73.6
Duke Cooney	11,408	26.2
Jared L. Birdsall (write-in)	65	0.1
Total votes	43,478	100.0

== District 5 ==
Incumbent Don Nottoli was elected to the 5th district in 1994, 1998, 2002, 2006, 2010, 2014, and 2018. He was eligible for reelection, but chose not to run.

=== Endorsements ===
Jaclyn Moreno

Newspapers

- The Sacramento Bee

Organizations

- Fem Dems of Sacramento
- Indivisible Sacramento
- Stonewall Democrats
- Wellstone Progressive Democrats

Labor unions

- National Nurses United

=== Results ===
2022 Sacramento County Board of Supervisors 5th district election
Primary election
Candidate	Votes	%
Pat Hume	27,139	42.4
Jaclyn Moreno	20,969	32.7
Steve Ly	11,681	18.2
Alex R. Joe	4,250	6.6
Total votes	64,039	100.0
General election
Pat Hume	46,497	50.2
Jaclyn Moreno	46,156	49.8
Total votes	92,653	100.0
