= New York's 104th State Assembly district =

American legislative district

Assemblymember
Jonathan Jacobson; D–Newburgh

New York's 104th State Assembly district is one of the 150 districts in the New York State Assembly. It has been represented by Jonathan Jacobson since 2018, succeeding Frank Skartados.

== Geography ==
=== 2020s ===
District 104 contains portions of Dutchess, Orange and Ulster counties. The towns of Clintondale, Lloyd, Marlboro, Milton and Plattekill, and the cities of Beacon, Newburgh and Poughkeepsie are within this district.

The district is entirely within New York's 18th congressional district, as well as encompassing the 39th and 41st districts of the New York State Senate.

=== 2010s ===
District 104 contains portions of Dutchess, Orange and Ulster counties. The towns of Clintondale, Lloyd, Marlboro and Milton, and the cities of Newburgh, Beacon, and part of the city of Poughkeepsie is within this district.

== Recent election results ==
=== 2026 ===
2026 New York State Assembly election, District 104
Party	Candidate	Votes	%
Democratic	Jonathan Jacobson		
Working Families	Jonathan Jacobson		
Total	Jonathan Jacobson (incumbent)		
Write-in			
Total votes			

=== 2024 ===
2024 New York State Assembly election, District 104
Party	Candidate	Votes	%
Democratic	Jonathan Jacobson	31,640	
Working Families	Jonathan Jacobson	5,635	
Total	Jonathan Jacobson (incumbent)	37,275	99.4
Write-in		237	0.6
Total votes		37,512	100.0
Democratic hold			

=== 2022 ===
2022 New York State Assembly election, District 104
Party	Candidate	Votes	%
Democratic	Jonathan Jacobson	20,878	
Working Families	Jonathan Jacobson	3,533	
Total	Jonathan Jacobson (incumbent)	24,411	99.4
Write-in		154	0.6
Total votes		24,565	100.0
Democratic hold			

=== 2020 ===
2020 New York State Assembly election, District 104
Party	Candidate	Votes	%
Democratic	Jonathan Jacobson	27,893	
Working Families	Jonathan Jacobson	3,019	
Total	Jonathan Jacobson (incumbent)	30,912	64.3
Republican	Andrew Gauzza IV	15,275	
Conservative	Andrew Gauzza IV	1,826	
Total	Andrew Gauzza IV	17,101	35.6
Write-in		33	0.1
Total votes		48,046	100.0
Democratic hold			

=== 2018 ===
2018 New York State Assembly election, District 104
Primary election
Party	Candidate	Votes	%
Democratic	Jonathan Jacobson	2,320	27.8
Democratic	Kevindaryan Lujan	1,862	22.3
Democratic	Jodi McCredo	1,761	21.1
Democratic	Ralph Coates	1,349	16.2
Democratic	Alexander Kelly	1,048	12.6
Write-in		0	0.0
Total votes		8,340	100
General election
Democratic	Jonathan Jacobson	21,585	60.0
Republican	Scott Manley	12,431	
Conservative	Scott Manley	1,917	
Total	Scott Manley	14,348	39.9
Write-in		27	0.1
Total votes		35,960	100.0
Democratic hold			

=== 2016 ===
2016 New York State Assembly election, District 104
Party	Candidate	Votes	%
Democratic	Frank Skartados	24,584	
Working Families	Frank Skartados	2,205	
Independence	Frank Skartados	1,170	
Total	Frank Skartados (incumbent)	27,959	80.9
Conservative	William Banuchi Sr.	6,280	
Reform	William Banuchi Sr.	296	
Total	William Banuchi Sr.	6,576	19.0
Write-in		20	0.1
Total votes		34,555	100.0
Democratic hold			

=== 2014 ===
2014 New York State Assembly election, District 104
Party	Candidate	Votes	%
Democratic	Frank Skartados	12,659	
Working Families	Frank Skartados	1,712	
Total	Frank Skartados (incumbent)	14,371	60.1
Republican	Sakima Green-Brown	7,137	
Conservative	Sakima Green-Brown	1,663	
Independence	Sakima Green-Brown	733	
Total	Sakima Green-Brown	9,533	39.9
Write-in		16	0.0
Total votes		23,920	100.0
Democratic hold			

=== 2012 ===
2012 New York State Assembly election, District 104
Party	Candidate	Votes	%
Democratic	Frank Skartados	24,690	
Working Families	Frank Skartados	2,310	
Total	Frank Skartados (incumbent)	27,000	67.5
Republican	Christine Bello	11,000	
Conservative	Christine Bello	1,979	
Total	Christine Bello	12,979	32.4
Write-in		20	0.1
Total votes		39,999	100.0
Democratic hold			
