= National Association of Affordable Housing Lenders =

- Abbreviation: NAAHL
- Formation: 1990
- Founder: Melvin J. Carriere
- Type: Trade association
- Tax ID no.: 52-1677752
- Legal status: 501(c)(6) nonprofit organization
- Headquarters: Washington, D.C., U.S.
- Location: Washington, D.C.
- Region served: United States
- Products: Policy advocacy, conferences, publications, research, member services
- Members: Banks, community development financial institutions (CDFIs), public, private, and nonprofit lenders
- President and CEO: Sarah Brundage
- Website: naahl.org

The National Association of Affordable Housing Lenders (NAAHL) is a U.S. trade organization founded by Melvin J. Carriere, representing financial institutions that provide financing and investing to low- and moderate-income communities. The NAAHL hosts conferences, distributes publications and provides testimony before the United States Congress on issues relating to affordable housing and community development lending.

== History ==
The organization was created in 1990 by Melvin J. Carriere. It is headquartered in Washington, D.C. Among the financial institutions that are NAAHL members are Bank of America, Bank of New York, Citigroup, JPMorgan Chase, Wachovia and Wells Fargo.

In 2024, Sarah Brundage was named president and chief executive officer of the organization. She succeeded former president and CEO of nine years, Benson (Buzz) Roberts. Before Roberts, Judy Kennedy served as CEO and president of the organization from 2001 to the time Roberts assumed the role.
