= Achillicus =

Village of ancient Greece

Achillicus or Achillikos (Ancient Greek: Ἀχιλλικός) was a village of ancient Greece on the island of Astypalaia.

Its site is unlocated.
