= Allium brulloi =

Scientific classification
- Kingdom: Plantae
- Clade: Tracheophytes
- Clade: Angiosperms
- Clade: Monocots
- Order: Asparagales
- Family: Amaryllidaceae
- Subfamily: Allioideae
- Genus: Allium
- Subgenus: A. subg. Allium
- Species: A. brulloi

Binomial name
- Allium brulloi Salmeri

Species of flowering plant

Allium brulloi is a plant species of wild onion from the family Amaryllidaceae, described originally by Cristina Salmeri in 1998. This is a flowering plant native to the calcareous rocks of Astipalaia, Greece, a SE Aegean island.

No subspecies are listed in the Catalog of Life.
