= The Case of the Missing Moon Rocks =

2012 non-fiction book by Joe Kloc

- Author: Joe Kloc
- Illustrator: Joe Kloc
- Language: English
- Subject: Stolen Moon rocks
- Genre: Non-fiction
- Publisher: The Atavist
- Publication date: February 22, 2012
- Publication place: United States
- Media type: Nook Book
- ISBN: 1937894045; ASIN B007BGZNZ8

The Case of the Missing Moon Rocks is a 2012 non-fiction book by Joe Kloc, a former contributing editor for Seed Magazine. It describes the efforts of both Joseph Gutheinz, a NASA Office of Inspector General Senior Special Agent turned college professor and his students to locate and find up to 79 missing Apollo 11 and 17 Moon rocks and plaques that the United States government gave away to 135 nations of the world, all 50 states and its territories.

It begins by telling the story of Operation Lunar Eclipse, the first successful sting operation to recover a piece of the Moon brought back by American astronauts, a sting operation the professor led and went undercover in, while still an agent. The sting operation successfully recovered the Honduras Apollo 17 Goodwill Moon Rock stolen in 1995, and recovered from Florida businessman Alan H. Rosen in 1998. This operation was funded in part with the financial assistance of H. Ross Perot, billionaire and former presidential candidate.

On October 1, 2012, Gutheinz gave a major speech on Operation Lunar Eclipse and the Moon Rock Project before the Engineering Colloquium at NASA's Goddard Space Flight Center. The speech was entitled "Finding the Missing Moon Rocks", and is preserved on a video at the Space Flight Center Library. In that speech Joe Gutheinz was critical of NASA and the U.S. Government for not turning over the Cyprus Apollo 17 Goodwill Moon Rock to Cyprus, which was also a major topic in Joe Kloc's novel. On May 16, 2013, news reports first broke that bowing from pressure from Cyprus the United States Government would give Cyprus its Apollo 17 Goodwill Moon Rock.

== See also ==
- Moon for Sale
- Sex on the Moon
- Stolen and missing Moon rocks
- "Unbelievable Mysteries Solved" from the Lost and Found TV series
