= Sting operation =

Deceptive way to catch a person committing a crime

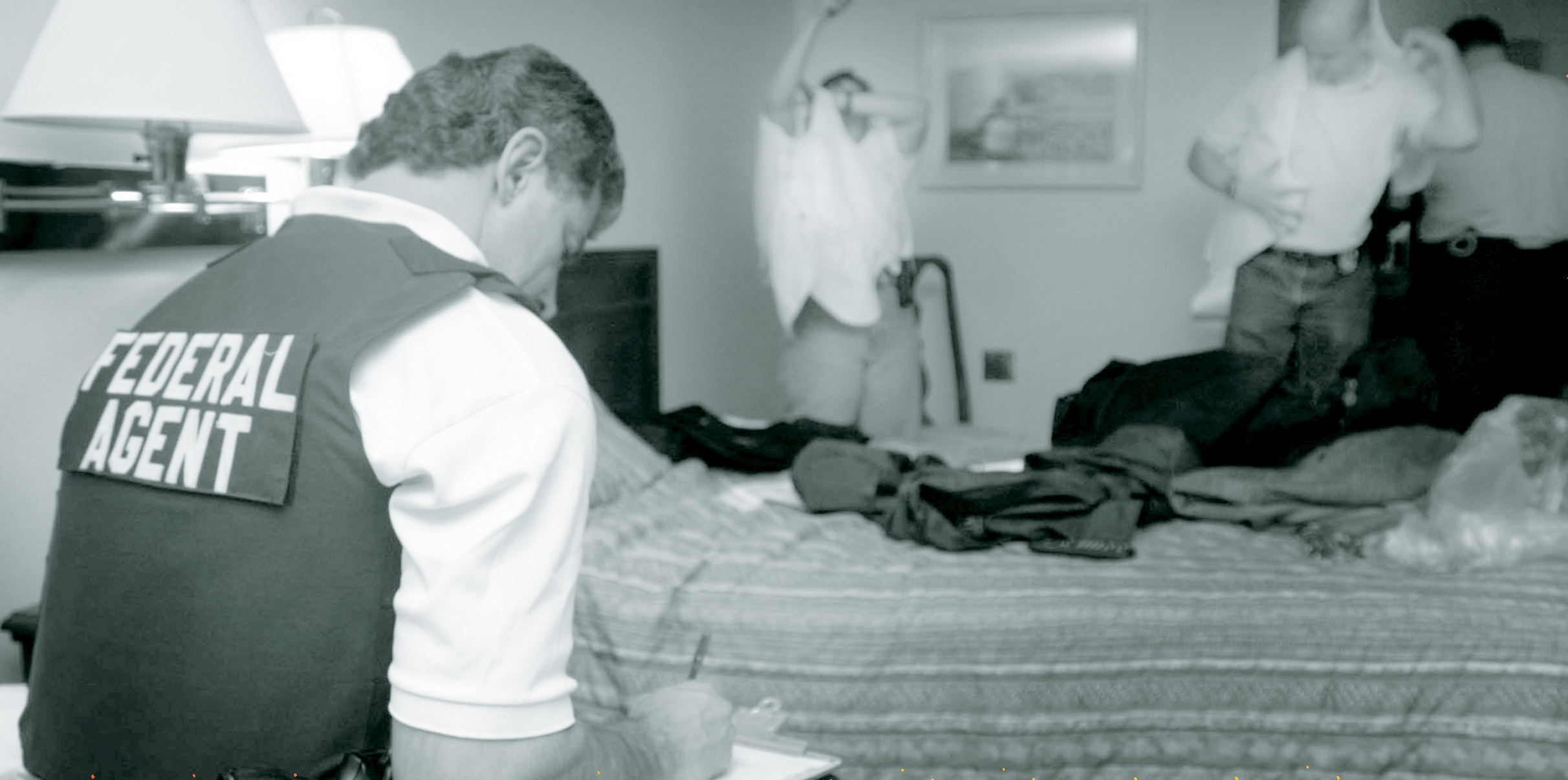
Naval Criminal Investigative Service preparations for an ecstasy sting

In law enforcement, a sting operation is a deceptive operation designed to catch a person attempting to commit a crime. A typical sting will have an undercover law enforcement officer, detective, or co-operative member of the public play a role as criminal partner or potential victim and go along with a suspect's actions to gather evidence of the suspect's wrongdoing. Mass media journalists have used sting operations to record video and broadcast to expose criminal activity.

The most basic type of sting operation in drug trafficking cases involves an undercover agent posing as a drug buyer. A variant on the sting operation when undercover agent poses as a seller rather than as a buyer is sometimes called a reverse sting operation.

Police informants used in sting operations are frequently asked to "wear a wire" (be fitted with concealed recording equipment).

In case of sting operations, during ensuing litigation a defense attorney may raise an "entrapment" defense, which asserts that law enforcement induced a person to commit a crime that they would otherwise have been unlikely to commit. However, the mere use of undercover agents does not necessarily mean entrapment. Some believe they can protect themselves by asking a suspected undercover agent "Are you a cop?" However, such a question will likely impair their criminal defense, as it shows a consciousness of guilt.

Sting operations are common in many countries, such as the United States, but they are not permitted in some countries, such as Sweden. There are prohibitions on conducting certain types of sting operations, such as in the Philippines, where it is illegal for law enforcers to pose as drug dealers to apprehend buyers of illegal drugs. In countries like France, Germany, and Italy, sting operations are relatively rare.

== Examples ==
- Police in Columbus, Ohio, used a bait car outfitted with surveillance technology to catch three 15- and 17-year-old car thieves.
- In 2004, a joint operation between US, British and Australian police used fake websites - otherwise known as honeypots - to catch hackers and pedophiles.
- Wearing luxury timepieces to catch a watch thief. In late 2022, the London Met Police twice had officers pose as potential victims by wearing high-quality watches such as Rolex. According to them, there was a reduction in watch robberies as a result of the operations.
- A man was ordered released from prison by a US judge who criticized the Federal Bureau of Investigation for relying on an "unsavory" informant for a fake conspiracy to blow up a synagogue in New York City and shoot down planes belonging to the National Guard. The defendants, according to prosecutors, spent months scouting out targets and securing what they believed to be explosives and missiles. They were arrested after allegedly planting fake bombs that had been packed with FBI-supplied inert explosives.
- Luring fugitives out of hiding by sending them mail telling them that they have won a vacation or sports tickets in a competition, which can be collected. In a 1985 sting known as Operation Flagship, US Marshals arrested over 100 fugitives by posing as a television company inviting them to the Washington Convention Center to claim free tickets for a Washington Redskins match. Another established a fictitious airline offering free tickets, arresting those who came to the fake check-in desk at Miami International Airport. Such arrests are significantly safer than arresting the fugitive at their home, as the target will often be unarmed and off-guard.
- Arranging for someone under the legal drinking or smoking age to buy alcoholic beverages or tobacco products from a store, or to ask an adult to buy the products for them.
- Police from Belgium posed as a documentary film crew to lure a Somali pirate to the country where he was thought to have hijacked a Belgian-registered ship. He was arrested at Brussels Airport and sentenced to 20 years in prison.
- Canadian and American police coordinated a fake wedding for two undercover FBI agents, and the celebration was in fact an operation targeting an international smuggling and counterfeiting operation based out of China. A total of eight guests were stopped by local police en route to the event. Authorities said the defendants had been smuggling highly realistic counterfeit American currency, bootleg cigarettes, drugs and illegal weapons.
- Posting a newspaper advertisement seeking a type of rare item known to have been stolen. In 1998, three agencies joined forces to conduct a sting operation where they successfully recovered the Honduras Goodwill Moon Rock from a vault in Miami. The sting operation was known as "Operation Lunar Eclipse" and the participating agencies were NASA Office of Inspector General, the United States Postal Inspection Service and U.S. Customs. The moon rock was offered to the undercover agents for US$5 million. Journalist Christina Reed broke that story in Geotimes in 2002. Operation Lunar Eclipse and the Moon Rock Project were the subject of the book The Case of the Missing Moon Rocks by Joe Kloc.
- In the Ibiza affair, Freedom Party of Austria (FPÖ) politician Heinz-Christian Strache was secretly recorded negotiating quid pro quo deals with an actor purporting to be a Russian oligarch. Public outcry led to the resignation of Strache and Austrian Chancellor Sebastian Kurz in 2019 as well as criminal charges for Strache.
- In 2021, David Ballantyne Smith, a security guard working at the British Embassy in Berlin was caught passing secret information to Russian authorities. The undercover operation was prompted by a letter he sent in 2020 to a military staff member at the Russian embassy in Berlin. Smith allegedly received money in exchange for secret information; there were unaccounted-for funds including €800 at his home in Potsdam. One undercover British operative posed as a "walk-in" Russian informant under the alias of Dmitry, when Smith escorted him into the building, after which Smith was seen on CCTV recording the earlier footage of Dmitry. A second undercover operative met him in the street and claimed to be a Russian intelligence officer named "Irina" who had been deployed to play the role of a GRU officer investigating whether Dmitry had been giving the UK information that had been potentially damaging to Russia. Smith, covertly recorded, told Irina that he needed to speak to "someone" (that someone being Dmitry) first before divulging any information.
- Posing as a minor on the internet, luring and catching online predators in the act.

== See also ==
- Advance-fee scam – Type of confidence trick fraud
- ATF fictional sting operations – Campaign of sting operations
- The Case of the Missing Moon Rocks
- Edison divorce torture plot – Kidnap and torture ring
- Entrapment – Legal doctrine
- Fence (criminal) – Person who buys stolen goods to resell
- Honey trapping – Investigative practice using romantic or sexual relationships
- Honeypot (computing) – Computer security mechanism
- Informant – Person who provides information
- List of scholarly publishing stings – List of nonsense papers that were accepted by an academic journal or conference
- Mr. Big (police procedure)
- Murder of Rachel Hoffman, the execution of a police informant during a sting operation
- Narada Sting Operation
- Operation Tennessee Waltz
- Possession of stolen goods
- John David Roy Atchison (1954–2007), Assistant US Attorney and children's sports coach, committed suicide in prison after being arrested in a sting operation and charged with soliciting sex from a 5-year-old girl
- Stephen Joseph Ratkai, arrested and convicted of espionage in Canada after a successful sting operation
- The Sting - a 1973 film
- Vigilantism in the United States of America
