= Moon for Sale =

- Directed by: Nick Davidson
- Starring: Harrison Schmitt & Joseph Gutheinz
- Country of origin: United Kingdom
- Original language: English

Production
- Producer: Nick Davidson
- Running time: 48 minutes
- Production company: BBC

Original release
- Release: 10 April 2007

Moon for Sale is a 2007 British documentary film directed and produced by Nick Davidson. The film premiered on BBC Two on 10 April 2007 and has played worldwide since. The primary focus of the documentary is on the value of the Moon to scientists and collectors. Dr. Harrison Schmitt, an Apollo 17 astronaut, is seen discussing harvesting Helium 3 on the Moon to meet Earth's energy needs. Also discussed in the documentary is the black market industry in stolen Apollo-era Moon rocks, which sell for as much as $5 million a gram. Specifically, the viewer is introduced to a sting operation known as Operation Lunar Eclipse, where for the first time a Moon rock, the Honduras Apollo 17 Goodwill Moon rock, is recovered by US federal agents.

== See also ==
- The Case of the Missing Moon Rocks
- Moon tree
- Sex on the Moon
- Joseph Gutheinz
