= Jonathan Jacobson =

American politician

Jonathan G. Jacobson

Member of the New York State Assembly from the 104th district
- Incumbent
- Assumed office November 2018
- Preceded by: Frank Skartados

Personal details
- Born: June 20, 1953 (age 73)
- Party: Democratic
- Education: Duke University (BA); New York Law School (JD)
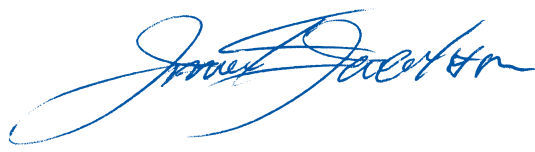
- Signature
- Website: Official website

Jonathan G. Jacobson (born June 20, 1953) is an American politician and attorney who has served in the New York State Assembly since 2018. A Democrat, Jacobson represents the 104th district, covering Newburgh and Poughkeepsie.

== Career ==
After graduating from Duke University with a B.A. degree and then New York Law School in June 1977 with a J.D. degree, Jacobson held a number of positions in New York state government, including Assistant Counsel to the Speaker of the Assembly, Assistant Attorney General, and Workers' Compensation Law Judge. He also operates his own law firm.

Jacobson chaired the City of Newburgh Charter Review Commission in the early 1990s, and is a former Newburgh city council member.

Jacobson ran for mayor of Newburgh in 2015 against incumbent Democrat Judy Kennedy. Although Jacobson defeated Kennedy in the Democratic primary, Kennedy won in the general election on the Independence Party line.

In 2018, Jacobson announced his campaign for the 104th Assembly district, which had been held by Democrat Frank Skartados until his death in April 2018. Jacobson defeated four candidates in the September primary election with 28% of the vote, and went on to defeat Republican nominee Scott Manley that November with 60% of the vote.

Because the seat was vacant following Skartados' death, Jacobson assumed office immediately, rather than waiting until January 2019 to be sworn in.

Jacobson was re-elected in 2020, receiving 61.74% of the vote against Republican challenger Andrew Gauzza IV. He ran unopposed in 2022.
