= Kleomedes of Astypalaia =

Ancient Greek boxer

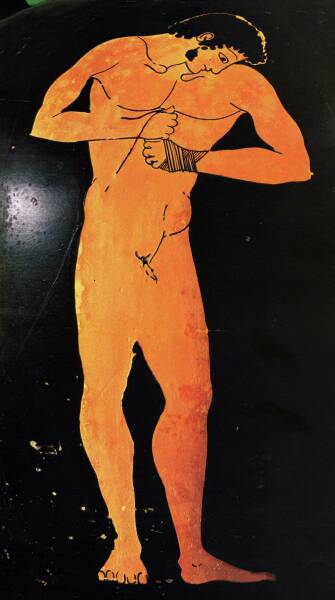
- Boxer fastens his boxing glove
- Born: Astypalaia, Greece
- Died: after 496 or 492 BC; Greece
- Occupation: Boxing
- Motive: rage over disqualification

Details
- Date: 496 or 492 BC
- Location: Astypalaia
- Killed: ≈ 27–60

Kleomedes of Astypalaia (Ancient Greek: Κλεομήδης ὁ Ἀστυπάλαιος, romanized: Kleomedes ho Astupalaios) was a famous Ancient Greek boxer who had a successful boxing career in the 5th century BC. In 496 or 492 BC, however, during a boxing match that took place either at the 71st or 72nd Olympic Games, Kleomedes killed his opponent, Ikos of Epidauros, using a foul blow. Because of the foul, he was disqualified and heavily fined by the Hellanodikai judges.

Kleomedes mourned his loss greatly for putting a stain on his record, and while returning to his hometown of Astypalaia, he stumbled upon the gymnasium from which he first learned boxing and, in a fit of Mania, took his grief out on the school, which was inhabited by about 60 children, by pulling out a pillar supporting the school's roof and purportedly killing at least 27 children. When the inhabitants of the city attempted to stone him for his actions, he fled into the local temple of Athena and hid in a ritual chest; nonetheless, the angry mob swiftly chased him down and caught up to him, but when they opened the chest, he was gone. With great shock, his confused pursuers consulted the Oracle of Delphi, which told the people that Kleomedes had become an immortal hero. From that moment on, the inhabitants of Astypalaia commemorated his legacy as one of a champion with annual sacrifices in his honor.
