= Judy Kennedy =

American politician and businesswoman (1944–2018)

Mayor of Newburgh, New York
- In office January 1, 2012 – April 15, 2018
- Preceded by: Nicholas J. Valentine
- Succeeded by: Torrance Harvey

Personal details
- Born: October 25, 1944 Salmon, Idaho, U.S.
- Died: April 15, 2018 (aged 73) Newburgh, New York, U.S.
- Cause of death: Ovarian cancer
- Party: Independent (2015–2018)
- Other political affiliations: Democratic (before 2015)
- Spouse: James Kennedy (m. 1964; div. 1981)
- Education: Eastern Oregon State College; Colorado State College (B.S.)
- Occupation: Politician, businesswoman

Judith Kennedy (October 25, 1944 – April 15, 2018) was an American politician and businesswoman. She was an independent politician, but was a member of the Democratic Party until 2015. In 2011, Kennedy was elected Mayor of Newburgh, New York, serving in the office until her death in 2018.

In the 1990s, Kennedy worked for Hewlett-Packard in Fort Collins, Colorado, before ultimately moving to Newburgh.

During her tenure as mayor, Kennedy focused on Newburgh's reputation as one of the most dangerous places to live in the United States, through focus on reducing crime, bringing in business and revitalizing neighborhoods. She won a second term running as an independent after losing the Democratic nomination in 2015.

== Early life ==
Kennedy was born in Salmon, Idaho, on October 25, 1944, to alcoholic parents. At the age of ten, Kennedy was responsible for her family when necessity forced her mother to take on a full-time job as a store clerk, while her father worked two jobs day and night. Three years later, Kennedy and her family moved to Baker City, Oregon.

After graduating from high school, Kennedy married James Kennedy in 1964 and worked as a dental assistant. She filed for divorce in 1981 and took custody of her four children.

== Education and career ==
Kennedy taught homemaking crafts at her local church's women's organization in Baker City. She served as president of the church's youth group and co-chaired many of the church's fundraising efforts. Subsequently, Kennedy went on to become president of the Working Women's Conference.

After her divorce, she studied at Eastern Oregon State College and later transferred to Colorado State College, where she earned a Bachelor of Science degree, majoring in business administration in 1982.

In the 1990s, Kennedy moved to Fort Collins, Colorado, and worked for Hewlett-Packard, including as a consultant for Baylor University and Albertsons. In September 2006, she moved to Newburgh, New York to help remodel her son's residence and to live closer with him.

== Mayoralty of Newburgh, New York ==
Kennedy ran for Mayor of Newburgh in 2011 after she was outraged by a 71% tax rate increase. She started a grassroots group whose members collected signatures for a petition to be delivered to state legislators in Albany, New York. She defeated mayor Nicholas J. Valentine, a Republican, in the general election. Kennedy was sworn in on January 1, 2012. Her platform included expanding the tax base to reduce everyone's taxes, increasing living-wage jobs and reforming government to make it more data-driven and focused on measurable outcomes.

Kennedy worked to change Newburgh's reputation as one of the most dangerous places to live in the United States, with focusing on reducing crime, bringing in business and revitalizing neighborhoods. She began her first term by announcing the formation of Community Action Teams with the goal of tackling issues ranging from beautification and job creation to public safety and a citywide arts and heritage festival. Three months into her first term, Kennedy oversaw the police shooting of Michael Lembhard which resulted in protests that included clashes between protesters and police. One of her main critics at that time, activist Omari Shakur, supported Kennedy's 2015 re-election campaign.

Kennedy won a second term in 2015 as the nominee of the Independence Party after beating Councilman Jonathan Jacobson (who had defeated her in a Democratic primary) in the general election.

In May 2016, Kennedy was diagnosed with ovarian cancer, but continued her council work. In April 2017, a celebration of her life was held in Newburgh with dozens of residents attending to honor her. Kennedy went to Mexico that month for treatment.

In a March 2018 interview, Kennedy reflected on her future aspirations for Newburgh remarking that her greatest hope is that "people lay down their sharp tongues and their weapons and decide to work together". She also criticized New York state for not providing money to Newburgh and remarking that "it is a slow progress. We don't have any money. We've been a cash-strapped city forever", however, she remained optimistic in the city's crime improvement.

In the aftermath of her death, a special election was originally discussed which would have been held in November 2018 to determine her successor to the mayoral office. However, in May 2018, the city council appointed councilman Torrance Harvey as Kennedy's successor.

== Death ==
Kennedy died of ovarian cancer while under hospice care in Newburgh on April 15, 2018, at age 73.

In response to her death, U.S. Representative Sean Patrick Maloney issued a statement on Twitter: "Judy Kennedy and I shared a love for the City of Newburgh, and I saw her in action working every day to make Newburgh the City that its wonderful people deserve".

A memorial service was held on April 19 at the Newburgh Armory Unity Center with family and local politicians in attendance, including U.S. Representative Maloney.
