= 2018 Sacramento County Board of Supervisors election =

Local election in California

- June 5 (primary)

3 of 5 seats on Sacramento County Board of Supervisors

The 2018 Sacramento County Board of Supervisors election took place on June 5, 2018, to elect three of the five seats of the Sacramento County Board of Supervisors. Runoffs would only occur if no candidate receives more than 50% of the votes cast in the contest, but no runoffs occurred this year for the Sacramento County Board of Supervisors. Local elections in California are officially nonpartisan. Each supervisor is elected to a four-year term, and does not have any term limits.

== District 1 ==
Incumbent Phil Serna was elected to the 1st district in 2010 and 2014. He was eligible for reelection.

=== Endorsements ===
Phil Serna

Labor unions

- California Federation of Labor Unions

Organizations

- California Apartment Association PAC
- Harry S. Truman Democratic Club of Greater Sacramento

=== Results ===
2018 Sacramento County Board of Supervisors 1st district election
Primary election
Candidate	Votes	%
Phil Serna (incumbent)	41,944	100.0
Total votes	41,944	100.0

== District 2 ==
Incumbent Patrick Kennedy was elected to the 2nd district in 2014 in the primary with 84.6% of the vote. He was eligible for reelection.

=== Endorsements ===
Patrick Kennedy

Labor unions

- California Federation of Labor Unions

Organizations

- California Apartment Association PAC
- Harry S. Truman Democratic Club of Greater Sacramento

=== Results ===
2018 Sacramento County Board of Supervisors 2nd district election
Primary election
Candidate	Votes	%
Patrick Kennedy (incumbent)	33,722	80.1
Ronald Bell	8,392	19.9
Total votes	42,119	100.0

== District 5 ==
Incumbent Don Nottoli was elected to the 5th district in 1994, 1998, 2002, 2006, 2010, and 2014. He was eligible for reelection.

=== Endorsements ===
Don Nottoli

Organizations

- California Apartment Association PAC

=== Results ===
2018 Sacramento County Board of Supervisors 5th district election
Primary election
Candidate	Votes	%
Don Nottoli (incumbent)	45,467	100.0
Total votes	45,467	100.0
