= Richard J. Maybury =

American libertarian writer

- Born: October 10, 1946 (age 80); Hamilton, Ohio, U.S.
- Occupations: Writer; author, journalist
- Writing career
- Pen name: Uncle Eric
- Genre: nonfiction

Richard J. Maybury (born October 10, 1946) is the publisher of U.S. & World Early Warning Report for Investors. He has written several entry level books on United States economics, law, and history from a libertarian perspective. He has written these things in epistolatory form, usually as an uncle writing to his nephew, answering questions. Maybury was a high school economics teacher. After failing to find a book which would give a clear explanation on his view of economics he wrote one himself. Some of his books include Uncle Eric Talks About Personal, Career & Financial Security; a book that is basically the foundation for his other books about the model perspective and Higher Law, Whatever Happened to Penny Candy?; a book that explains the history of the [United States] economic model and how it was based on free-market Austrian economics, Whatever Happened to Justice?; a book about his juris naturalist philosophical viewpoints regarding the foundations of America's legal system, British Common Law, the law of the Franks, and early Christian Ireland.

== Early life and family ==
Maybury was born on October 10, 1946, in Hamilton, Ohio, to parents Anthony J., and executive of a West Coast coffee company and co-author of Common Sense Business for Kids, and Ruth M. (née Wellinghoff) Maybury. He married Marilyn N. Williams on August 7, 1967. He has 4 siblings: David, Linda, Jane, and Debra.

== Theories ==
=== Juris Naturalism ===
Maybury's viewpoint is "juris naturalism". Maybury created the term juris naturalism, and called himself a juris naturalist, because he believed no other label was able to fully describe the concept, which he believed is modeled on the viewpoints of many of America's Founders.

=== Thousand Year War ===
Maybury has had disagreements with those who say that Muslims are terrorists. In his book, The Thousand Year War, he says that Muslims have been persecuted as much as the Jews by Western civilization through events such as the Crusades, and that they are retaliating after being wronged by the Europeans and the western culture, including the United States government. Maybury states that Muslim nations and people still treat events that occurred centuries ago as modern-day events, and that the recent attacks are retaliatory strikes against what they perceive to be their long-time enemies. He praises the mediaeval Muslim civilizations for their advances in many fields. He also states that Muslims are responsible for preserving the philosophies of ancient people, such as Aristotle.

=== Maybury's Two Laws ===
Maybury bases his work on common law, namely

- Do all you have agreed to do
- Do not encroach on other persons or their property.

The first law is related to contract law. A contract is an agreement between two or more parties, in which they promise to perform certain actions for and recognize certain rights of the other parties. The second law is related to some criminal law and tort law. Violators of these types of laws have committed acts like theft or violence against other people. (When referencing these two laws, Maybury has at times requested they be known as "Maybury's Laws," and stated exactly as above.) He has also mentioned that there may be another (or others) undiscovered law related to the subjects of law that the two he shows don't cover.

=== Chaostan ===
Maybury has declared that nearly a third of the Earth's surface is Chaostan, the land of great chaos. Chaostan is in his view prone to war, financial ill, and tyranny because they never received the Two Laws. The area extends from the Arctic Ocean to the Indian Ocean and Poland to the Pacific, plus North Africa.

=== The New Axis ===
Maybury thinks it is possible that some or all of the areas in Chaostan are secretly co-operating, either through political alliance or along ancient ethnic lines. This term was first used in May 1996.

== Military Experience ==
Maybury was a sergeant in the United States Air Force from 1967 to 1971. He served with the 605th Air Commando Squadron in Central America, and with the 75th Military Airlift Squadron in Vietnam. He was also a General Military Training instructor at Travis Air Force Base; and participated in covert operations in South and Central America.

== Books ==
=== Themes ===
Maybury's books are marked with emphasis on paradigms, or "models" as he calls them. One of his books, Are You Liberal, Conservative, or Confused is dedicated entirely to this topic. He commonly addresses his letters to an imaginary student named Chris.

=== Style ===
All of his books are written in the epistolatory style, as letters from the fictitious Uncle Eric to his nephew. The personal tone of the "letters" convey a certain sense of urgency, yet are remarkably understated compared to other revisionist and contrarian viewpoints.

The books have many illustrations, maps and pull-quotations of historical persons. Though, oddly to some, he rarely if ever quotes recent (20th century) writers. Perhaps it is because he distills the essence of free-market economic thought (what we often call "Libertarian") into fundamental terms that stand on their own. In other words, rather than quoting for instance Henry Hazlitt to support a thesis, he describes an idea in foundational terms that arrive at a conclusion that readers of Hazlitt may find familiar.

=== Titles ===
Whatever Happened to Penny Candy, 5th Edition
- Author: Richard J. Maybury
- Language: English
- Series: Uncle Eric Books
- Subject: Economics
- Genre: Young Adult
- Publisher: Bluestocking Press
- Publication date: May 15, 2004
- Publication place: United States
- Media type: Print (Paperback)
- Pages: 192 pp
- ISBN: 0-942617-52-5
- OCLC: 54865477
- Dewey Decimal: 330.15/7 22
- LC Class: HB171 .M46 2004

Maybury's in-print books to date are:

- Ancient Rome: How It Affects You Today
- Are You Liberal? Conservative? or Confused?
- Evaluating Books: What Would Thomas Jefferson Think About This?
- The Clipper Ship Strategy: For Success in Your Career, Business, and Investments
- The Money Mystery: The Hidden Force Affecting Your Career, Business, and Investments
- The Thousand Year War in the Mideast
- Uncle Eric Talks About Personal, Career, and Financial Security
- Whatever Happened to Justice?
- Whatever Happened to Penny Candy? 5th Edition
- World War I: The Rest of the Story and How It Affects You Today
- World War II: The Rest of the Story & How It Affects You Today
- The 56 Year Honeymoon: The Story of Samantha & Rick

All of his books are published by Bluestocking Press

== Journals & Newspapers ==
=== EWR ===
The US & World Investors Early Warning Report (EWR) is Maybury's monthly financial newsletter. EWR seeks to apply the Uncle Eric model to the real world and provide forecasts and warnings of financial changes before they happen. It is very cautious in outlook, and has low toleration of risk.

=== Freelance Work ===
Following his military experience, but prior to EWR, Maybury was a freelance writer whose works were featured in The Wall Street Journal, The Washington Times, USA Today and other notable publications.

=== Moneyworld ===
Maybury was previously global affairs editor for Moneyworld
