= Frank Skartados =

Greek-American politician and businessman (1956–2018)

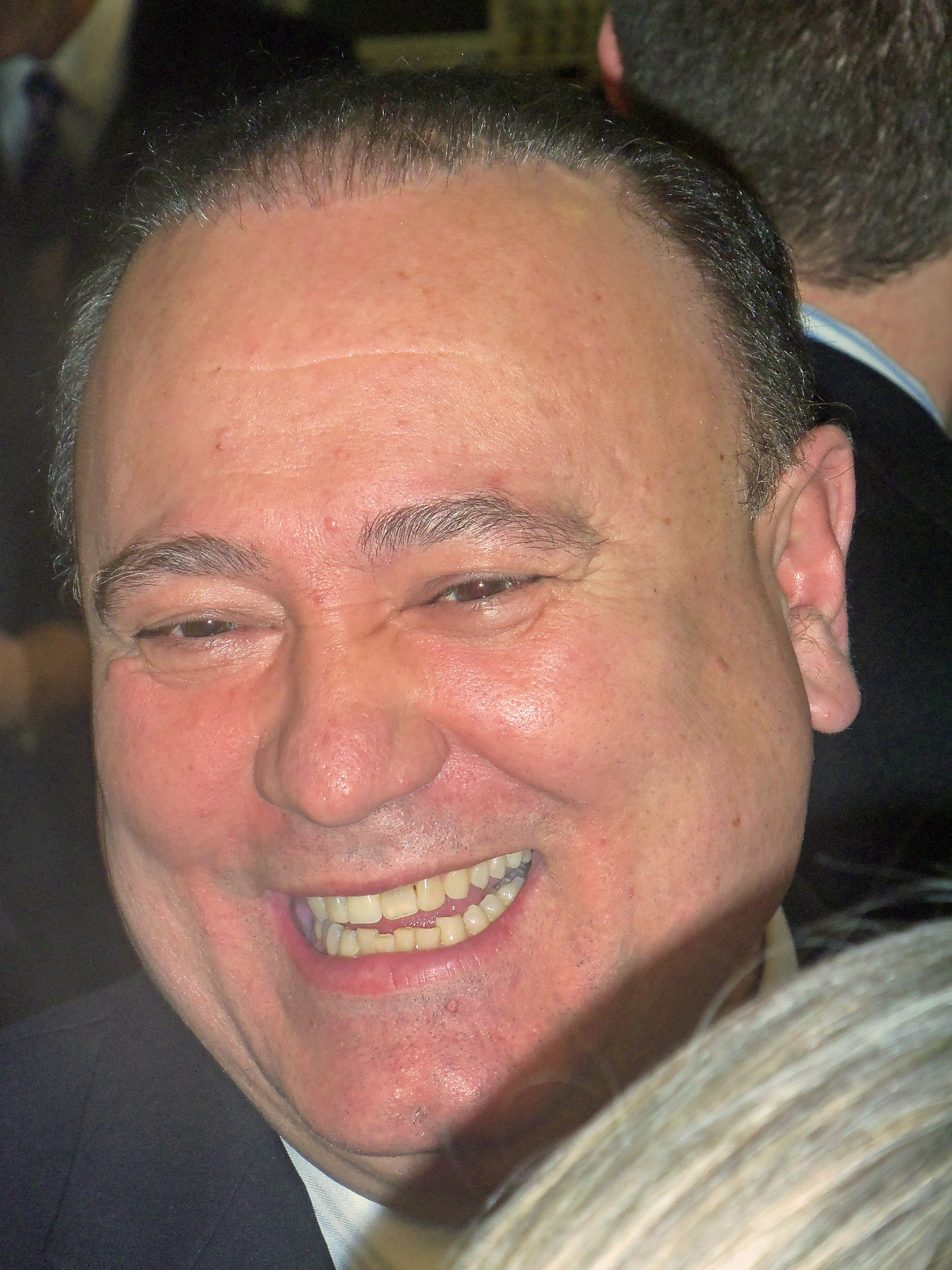

Member of the New York State Assembly from the 104th district
- In office March 21, 2012 – April 15, 2018
- Preceded by: Thomas Kirwan
- Succeeded by: Jonathan Jacobson

Member of the New York State Assembly from the 100th district
- In office January 1, 2009 – December 31, 2010
- Preceded by: Thomas Kirwan
- Succeeded by: Thomas Kirwan

Personal details
- Born: January 3, 1956 Astypalea, Greece
- Died: April 15, 2018 (aged 62) Newburgh, New York, U.S.
- Party: Democratic
- Education: State University of New York at New Paltz (BA); California State University, Sacramento (MA)
- Profession: Politician, businessman

Frank Skartados (January 3, 1956 – April 15, 2018; Greek: Φρανκ Σκαρτάδος) was a Greek-American politician and businessman.

Skartados was a member of the Democratic Party. A resident of the Ulster County hamlet of Milton, where he ran a farm, he was the Assemblyman for the 104th district of the New York State Assembly in the mid-Hudson, which includes both the city and town of Newburgh, the cities of Beacon, and Poughkeepsie, the hamlet of Marlboro, and the town of Lloyd. He defeated 14-year Republican incumbent Thomas J. Kirwan in 2008 for what was then the 100th district, but narrowly lost to him two years later in a contest not formally decided for four months.

Kirwan died less than a year into his term, and Skartados won the 2012 special election to fill the seat, the first election held for what was now the redrawn 104th district, which excluded some areas of Ulster County that were heavily Republican. He went on to win the general election that year and re-election in 2014 and 2016. After his death from pancreatic cancer in April 2018, Skartados was succeeded by Jonathan Jacobson.

== Early life ==
Skartados was born on the Greek island of Astypalaia. He grew up on a small farm which he worked with his father.

At age 14, in 1970, Skartados and his mother moved to New York City. Skartados graduated from George Washington High School in upper Manhattan. He later worked in the restaurant industry and eventually owned one. His business savvy eventually allotted him the funds to educate himself at the State University of New York at New Paltz, where he earned a degree in political science. At the same time, he worked at the Commandant's Office of the New York Military Academy in Cornwall, New York.

After college, Skartados attained a master's degree in International Studies at the State University of California at Sacramento. He later served an internship at the United Nations Center Against Apartheid.

== Early career ==
For the next eight years, Skartados worked back at the New York Military Academy as chairman of the Health Department. He also taught Environmental Studies and American History. In 2000, Skartados abdicated his seat at the military academy.

Subsequently, Skartados focused on renovating properties in downtown Poughkeepsie, including building the Aegean Entertainment Center, the largest entertainment venue between Albany and New York City. Skartados was the founder and president of the Academy Street Business Association in Poughkeepsie. Skartados helped in the revitalization of the street's business environment, which changed the negative perception of the area.

In addition to his work with the Poughkeepsie Partnership – a go-between to promote the partnership of business and city government agencies – Skartados also served on the mayor's Promotions & Events Committee to help further promote and attract new people to the city of Poughkeepsie.

== Assembly career ==
His political career began when he defeated 14-year incumbent Thomas Kirwan in 2008. Skartados served the 100th district of the New York State Assembly from 2008 to 2010. However, Kirwan narrowly recaptured the seat in 2010 but died in late 2011. On March 20, 2012, a special election was held for the vacant seat, which Skartados won with more than 60 percent of the vote. He was re-elected for a full term on November 6, 2012, and on November 4, 2014, by 60% of the vote.

During his Assembly tenure, Skartados supported bills that focused on the environment, criminal justice reforms, consumer protection, veterans benefits, business regulation reform, family court reform, and library election reform. Skartados secured millions of dollars for struggling schools in Marlboro, Highland and Poughkeepsie. He also helped secure state funding to purchase fire trucks, plows, and police cars, and pursue environmental projects such as the Hudson Valley Rail Trail. Skartados also helped expand non-profit grounds such as soup kitchens, Newburgh Habitat for Humanity, and Newburgh Safe Harbor's Park. He remained in the assembly until his death in April 2018.

== Personal life and death ==
Skartados had one child at the time of his death.

On April 12, 2018, Skartados was hospitalized in Newburgh, New York, with a "serious illness" and according to his chief of staff was "not likely going to recover". He died in the hospital three days later, of pancreatic cancer, at age 62.

In response to Skartados' death, U.S. Representative Sean Patrick Maloney praised Skartados' "legacy as a fighter for the people he loved and a voice for many who had none".

== See also ==
- List of Greek Americans
- List of people diagnosed with pancreatic cancer
- List of Sacramento State people

New York State Assembly
Preceded by Thomas Kirwan	New York State Assembly, 100th District; 2009–2010	Succeeded by Thomas Kirwan
Preceded by Thomas Kirwan	New York State Assembly, 100th District; 2012–13	Succeeded by Aileen Gunther
Preceded by John McEneny	New York State Assembly, 104th District; 2013–2018	Succeeded by Jonathan Jacobson
