= Honduras lunar sample displays =

Goodwill gifts containing moon fragments

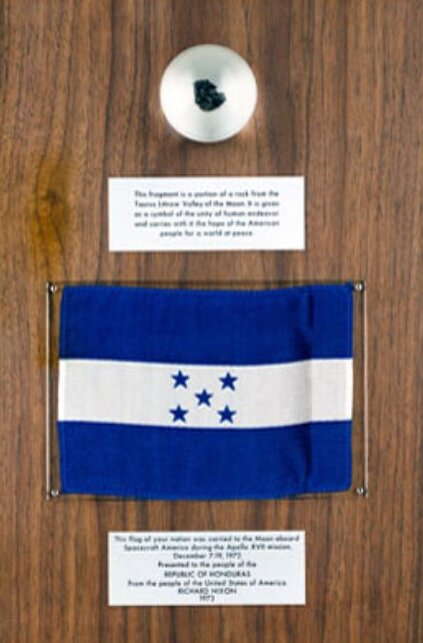
1973 NASA photo of Honduras Apollo 17 plaque with "Moon rock" and Honduras flag

The Honduras lunar sample displays are two commemorative plaques consisting of small fragments of Moon specimen brought back with the Apollo 11 and Apollo 17 lunar missions and given in the 1970s to the people of Honduras by United States President Richard Nixon as goodwill gifts.

== Description ==
=== Apollo 11 ===
At the request of Nixon, NASA had about 250 presentation plaques made following Apollo 11 in 1969. Each included about four rice-sized particles of Moon dust from the mission totaling about 50 mg. The Apollo 11 lunar sample display has an acrylic plastic button containing the Moon dust mounted with the recipient's country or state flag that had been to the Moon and back. All 135 countries received the display, as did the 50 states of the United States and the U.S. provinces and the United Nations.

The plaques were given as gifts by Nixon in 1970.

=== Apollo 17 ===
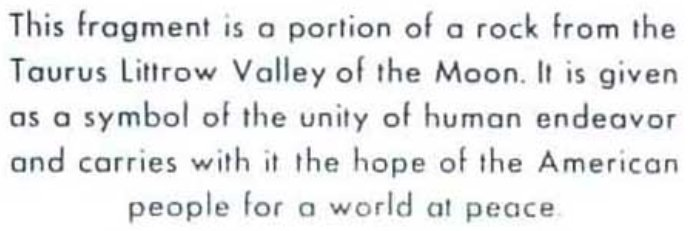
Message on Apollo 17 plaque

The sample Moon rock collected during the Apollo 17 mission was later named lunar basalt 70017, and dubbed the Goodwill rock. Pieces of the rock weighing about 1.14 grams were placed inside a piece of acrylic lucite, and mounted, along with a flag of the country which would receive it, that had flown on Apollo 17.

In 1973 Nixon had the plaques sent to 135 countries, and to the United States with its territories, as a goodwill gesture.

== History ==
The Honduras Apollo 17 "goodwill Moon rocks" plaque display came into the possession of retired colonel Roberto Agurcia Ugarte; it is unclear how Ugarte obtained it. Ugarte put the plaque up for sale, covering the stars of the Honduras flag to conceal the plaque's origin. Alan Rosen, a Florida fruit distributor, purchased it from Ugarte for what he claims was $50,000 in 1996.

In 1998 Rosen attempted to sell the rock and was caught in a sting operation, Operation Lunar Eclipse; U.S. Government agents recovered the rock.

A lawsuit filed against Rosen, United States v. One Lucite Ball Containing Lunar Material (One Moon Rock) and One Ten Inch by Fourteen Inch Wooden Plaque, was settled in 2003. Rosen forfeited the Honduras Apollo 17 lunar sample plaque display, which was presented in 2004 to Honduran President Ricardo Maduro. The Honduras Apollo 17 goodwill Moon rock plaque, of as 2012, is on display in Tegucigalpa at Centro Interactivo Chiminike.

According to Robert Pearlman, the whereabouts of the Honduras Apollo 11 goodwill lunar display are unknown.

== See also ==
- List of Apollo lunar sample displays

== Bibliographic information ==
- Anzovin, Steven (2000). Famous first facts, international edition: a record of first happenings, discoveries, and inventions in world history. New York: H.W. Wilson. ISBN 0824209583.
