= Astypalaia =

Greek island in the Aegean Sea

Astypalaia Αστυπάλαια
- Municipality
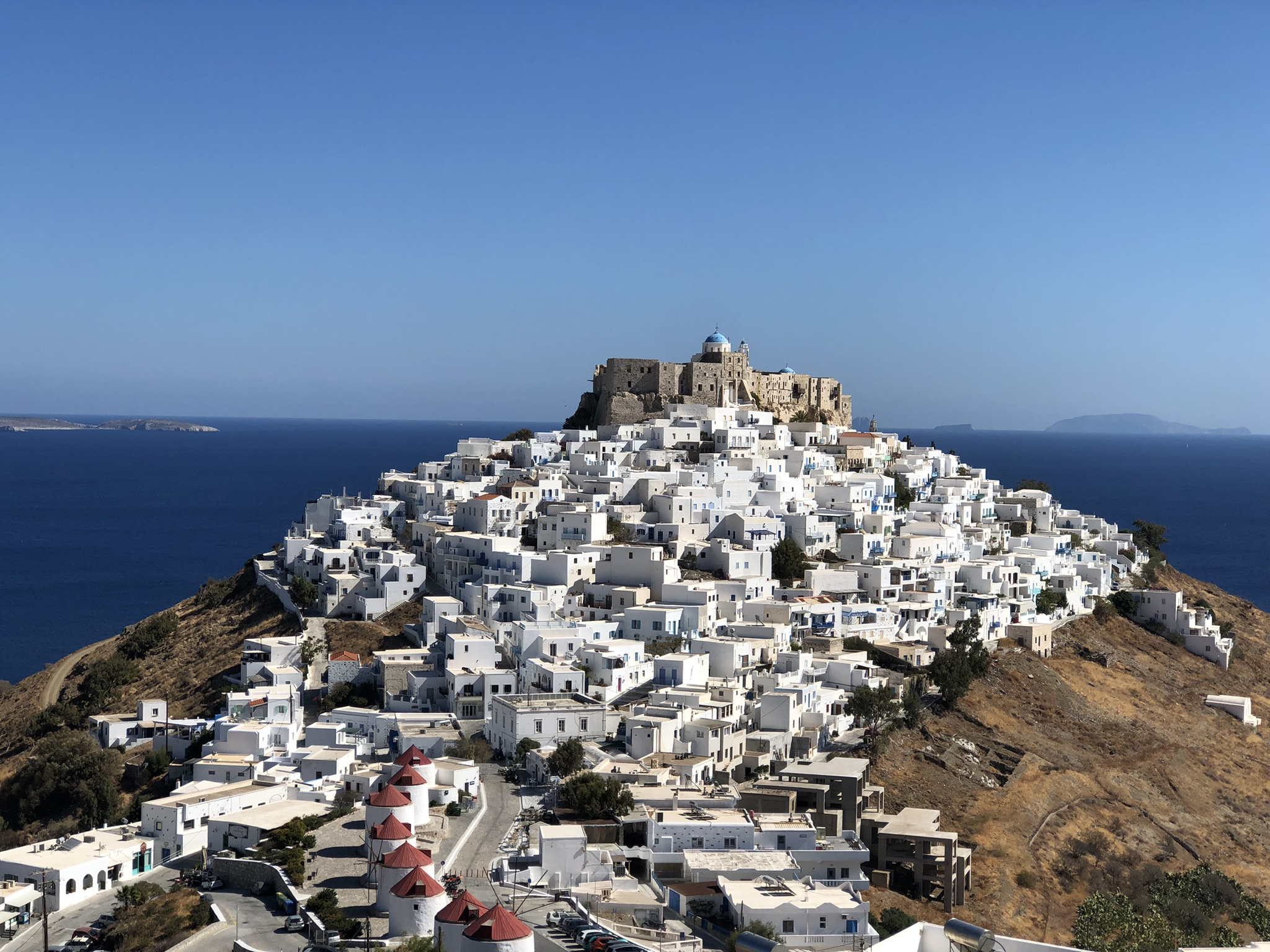
- Astypalaia (chora)

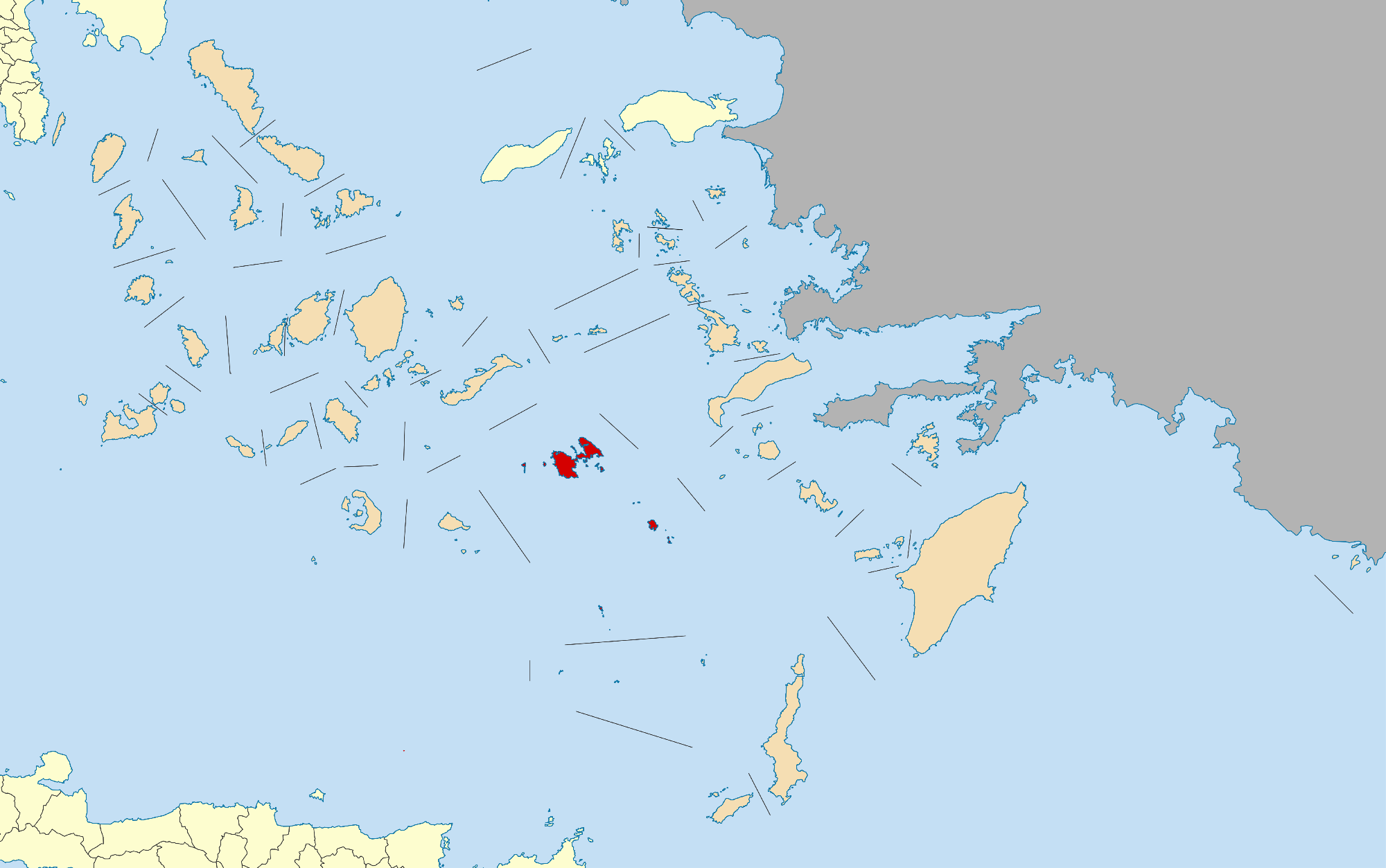

- Location within Greece
- Coordinates: 36°33′N 26°21′E
- Country: Greece
- Administrative region: South Aegean
- Regional unit: Kalymnos

Area
  - Municipality: 114.1 km^{2} (44.1 sq mi)
- Highest elevation: 506 m (1,660 ft)
- Lowest elevation: 0 m (0 ft)

Population (2021)
  - Municipality: 1,376
  - Density: 12.06/km^{2} (31.23/sq mi)
- Time zone: UTC+2 (EET)
  - Summer (DST): UTC+3 (EEST)
- Postal code: 859 00
- Area code: 22430
- Vehicle registration: ΚΧ, ΡΟ, ΡΚ
- Website: astipalea.org

Astypalaia (Greek: Αστυπάλαια, pronounced [astiˈpalea]), is a Greek island with 1,376 residents (2021 census). It belongs to the Dodecanese, an archipelago of fifteen major islands in the southeastern Aegean Sea. However, many scholars recognize Astypalaia as an extension of the Cyclades, as many cultural and ecological components of the island are more indicative of the Cyclades rather than the Dodecanese.

The island is 18 kilometres (11 miles) long, 13 kilometres (8 miles) across at its widest, and covers an area of 97 km^{2}. Along with numerous smaller uninhabited offshore islets (the largest of which are Sýrna and Ofidoussa), it forms the Municipality of Astypalaia, which is part of the Kalymnos regional unit. The municipality has an area of 114.077 km^{2}. The capital and the previous main harbour of the island is Astypalaia or Chora, as it is called by the locals.

== Name ==
Astypalaia was believed to be named after Astypalaea, an ancient Greek mythological figure. The island is known in Italian as Stampalia and in Ottoman Turkish as İstanbulya (استانبوليه)

== Geography ==
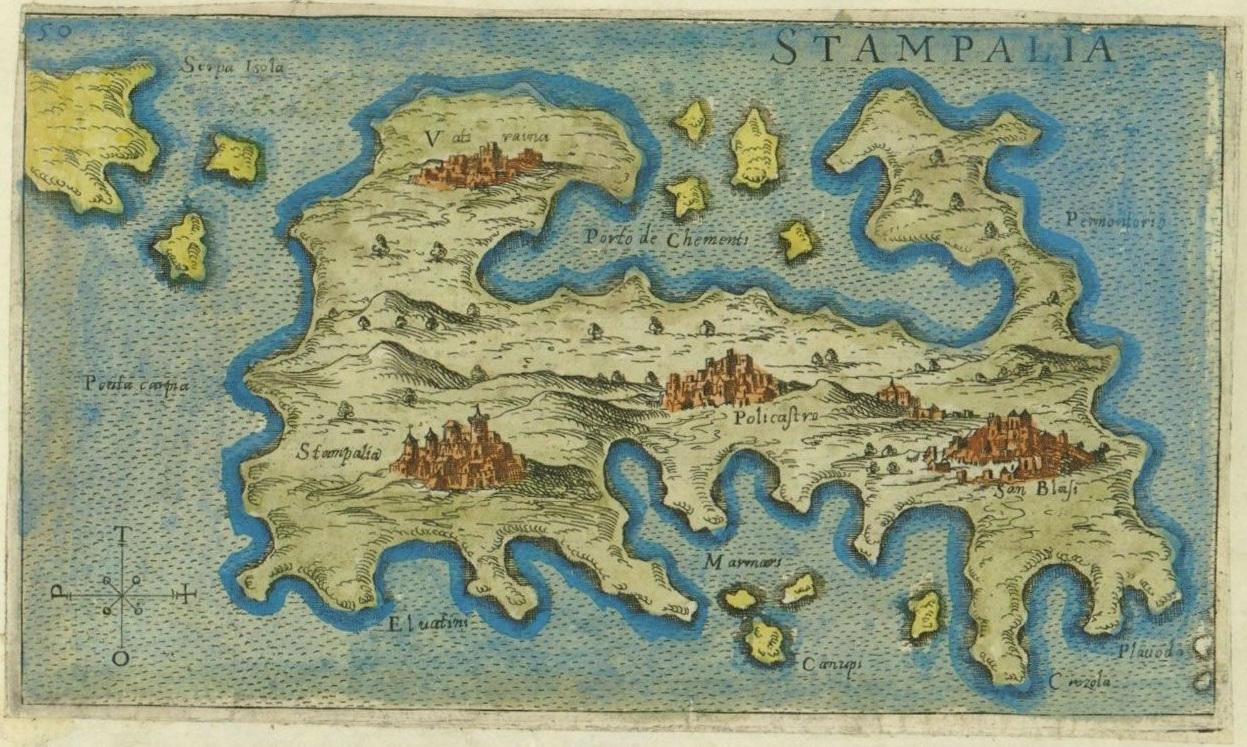
Map of Astypalaia by Giacomo Franco (1597).

The coasts of Astypalaia are rocky with many small pebble-strewn beaches. A small band of land of roughly 126 metres wide almost separates the island in two sections at Stenó.

A new harbour has been built in Agios Andreas on the mid island from where now the connections are west and east with Athenian port of Piraeus and the other islands of the Dodecanese. Flight connections with Athens are available from the airport close to Maltezana.

=== Places ===
- Villages : Astypalaia or Chora (pop. 1,084 in 2021), Analipsi or Maltezana (111), Livadia (159), Vathy (17)
- Islets : Agía Kyriakí, Astypálaia, Avgó, Glynó, Zaforás, Kounoúpoi, Koutsomýti, Mesonísi, Ofidoússa, Plakída, Pontikoúsa, Stefánia, Sýrna, Fokionísia, Khondró, Khondronísi (all uninhabited except Astypálaia itself)

== History ==
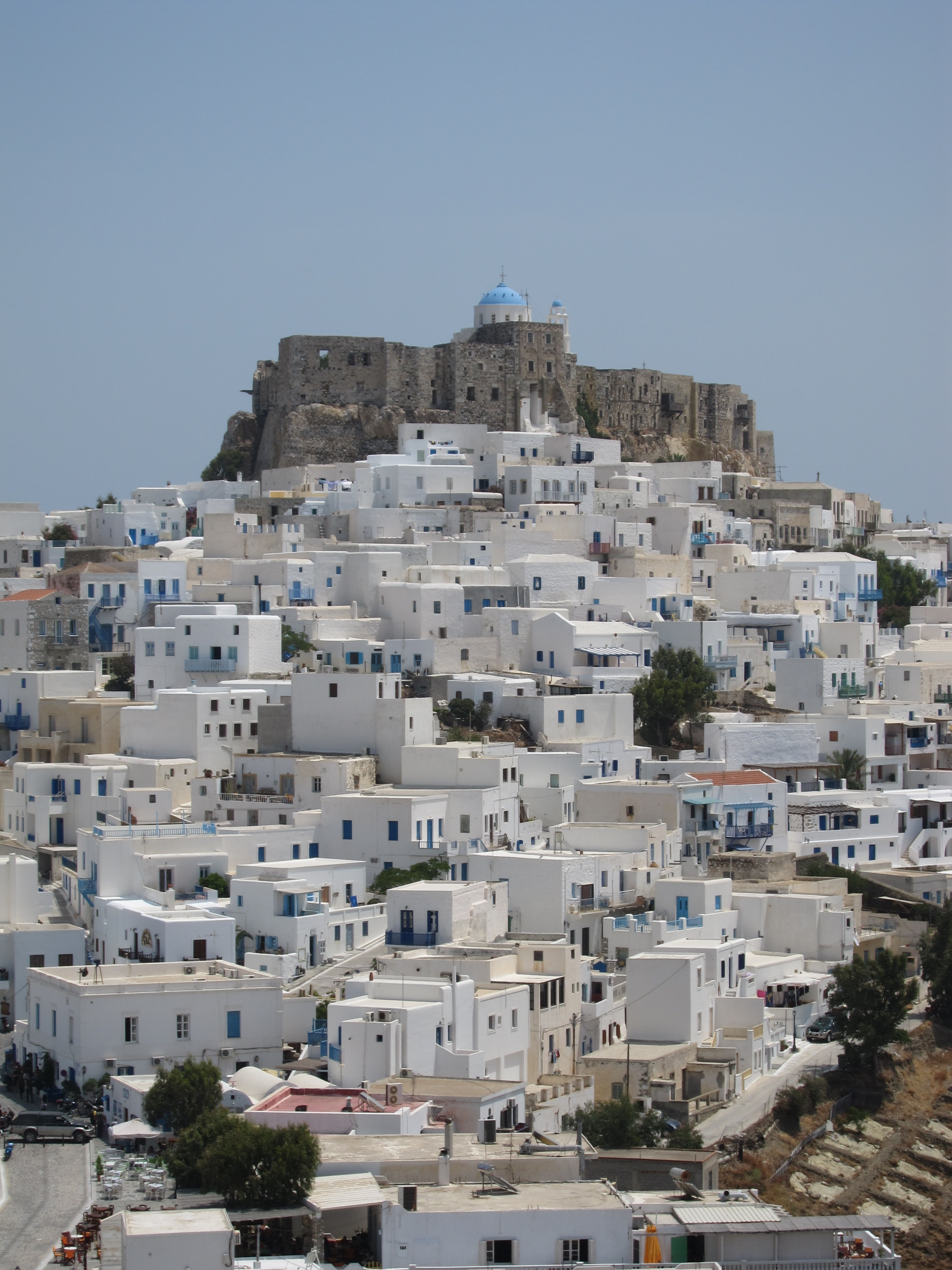
View of Astypalaia and its castle

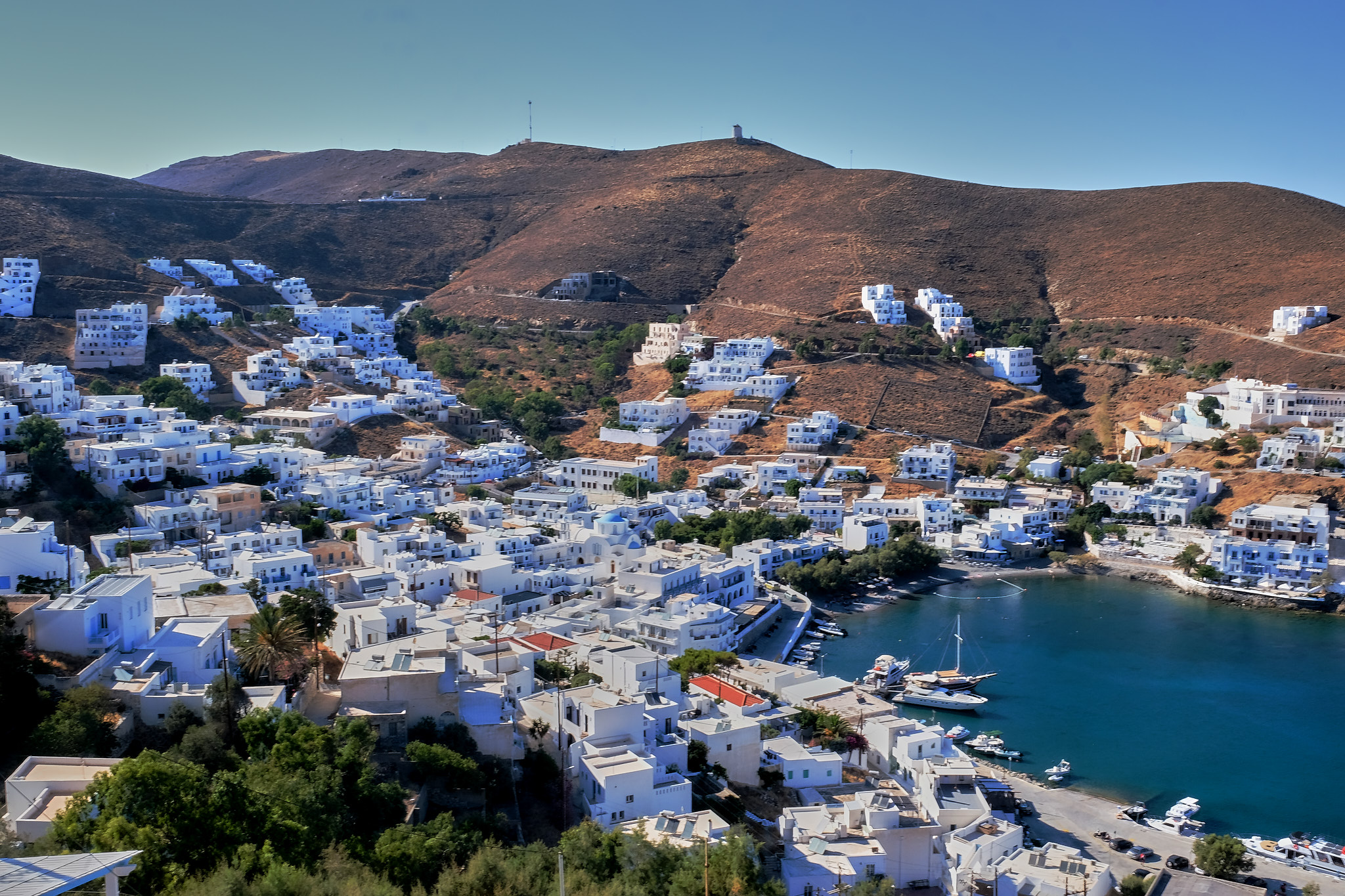
View of the Astypalaia village

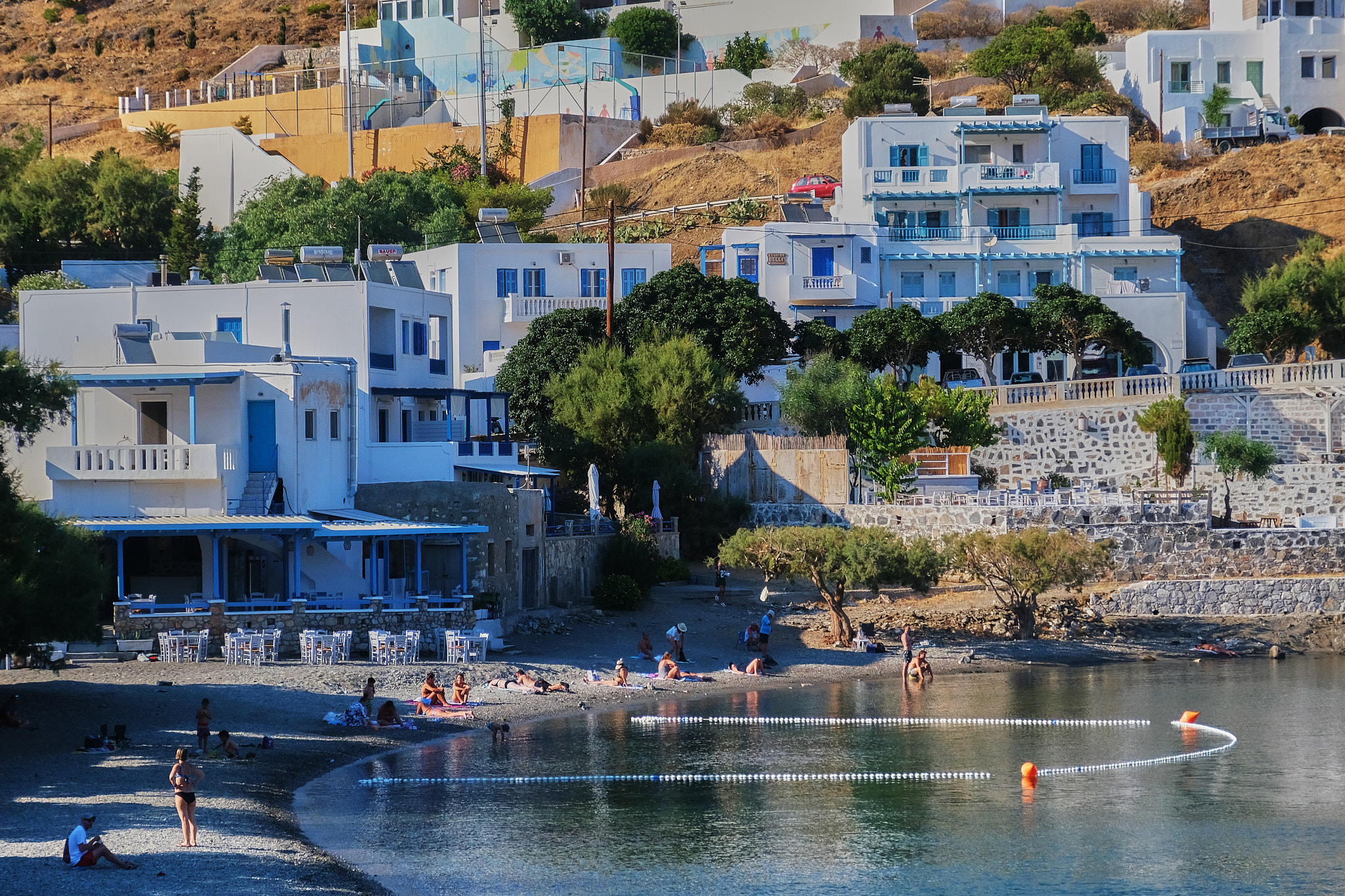
Astypalaia's beach

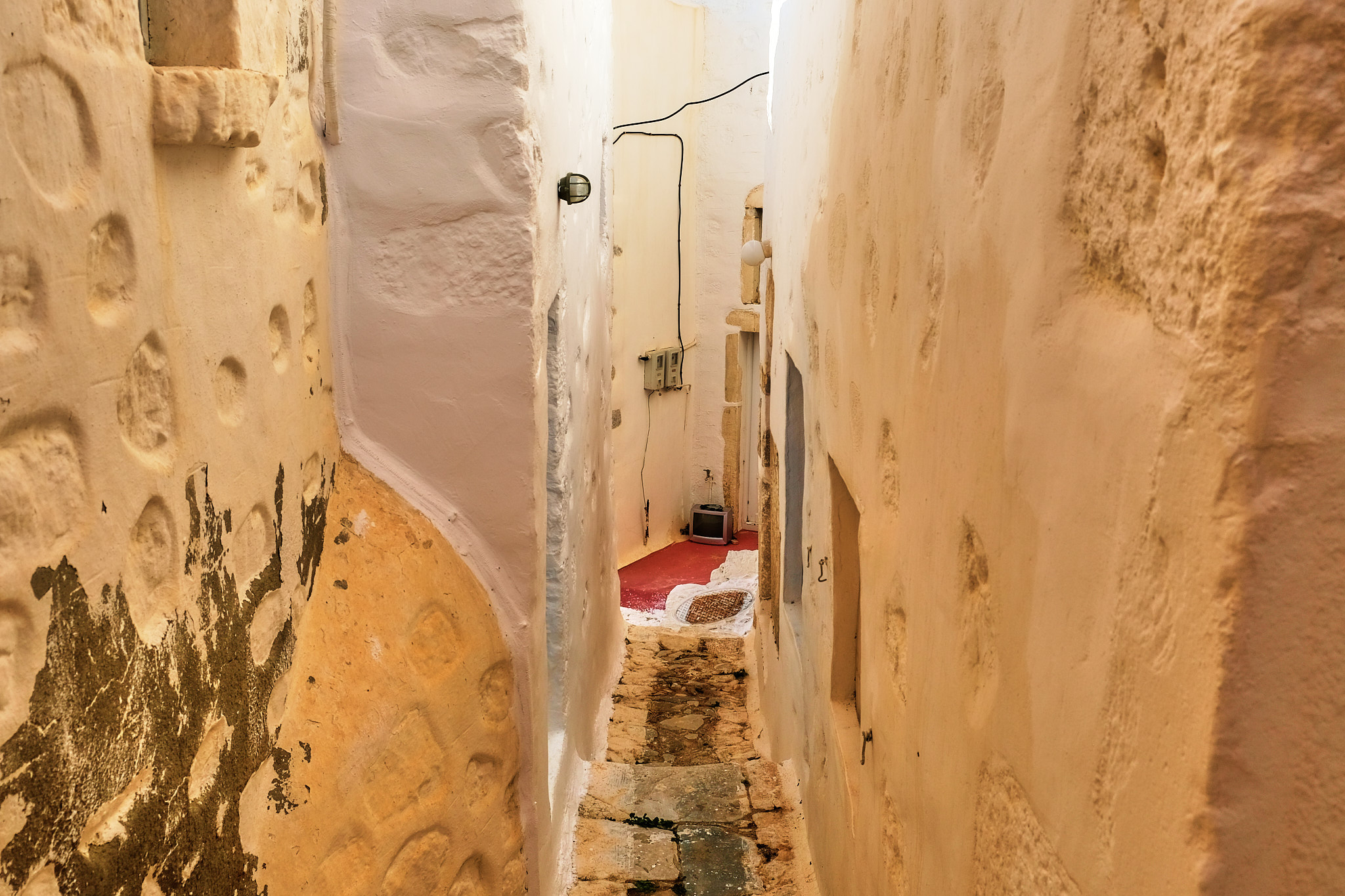
Narrow path to houses in Astypalaia

In Greek mythology, Astypalaia was a woman abducted by Poseidon in the form of a winged fish-tailed leopard. The island was colonized by Megara or possibly Epidaurus, and its governing system and buildings are known from numerous inscriptions. Pliny the Elder records that Rome accorded Astypalaia the status of a free state. In the imperial era, it was first part of the province of Achaia and was later assigned to the Aegean province of Insulae.

During the Middle Ages it belonged to the Byzantine Empire. It is presumed that it was conquered by the Latins in the aftermath of the Fourth Crusade in the early 13th century, but this is not documented. The island, known as Stampalia by the Latins, is mentioned for the first time in 1334, during a devastating raid by the Turkish ruler Umur of Aydin. It was only shortly before this raid that the Venetian nobleman Giovanni Querini had purchased the island, declared himself its lord, and built a castle and a palace there. The Querini held the island until 1522, and added the name of the island to their family name, which became Querini Stampalia. Astypalaia was conquered by the Ottoman Empire in 1522, and remained under Ottoman control until 1912, with two interruptions: from 1648 until 1668, during the Cretan War, it was occupied by Venice, and from 1821 to 1828 during the Greek War of Independence, when it was part of the provisional Greek republic.

On April 12, 1912, during the Italo-Turkish War, a detachment of the Regia Marina landed on Astypalaia, which thus became the first island of the Dodecanese to be occupied by Italy. From there the Italians, on the night between the 3rd and 4 May, landed on Rhodes. The island remained under Italian governance until World War II. In a September 1943 naval battle near Astypalaia, the Greek destroyer Vasilissa Olga together with the British destroyers HMS Faulknor and Eclipse sank a German convoy, consisting of the transports Pluto (2,000 tons) and Paolo (4,000 tons).

In 1947, through the Treaty of Paris, it became part of Greece along with the rest of the Dodecanese island group.

=== Archaeology ===
A single tusk of a large dwarf elephant belonging to the genus Palaeoloxodon, probably representing an endemic species, was excavated from the island during the 1990s.

The religious and political center of the classical city-state of Astypalaia was the hill crowned by the Querini castle. The modern town of Chora occupies the same site, and worked stones from ancient monuments are reused in older houses as well as the castle. A one-room museum at Pera Gialos, on the shore near the old port, displays inscriptions, grave monuments, and other artifacts from the island. The earliest material on display is fragments of Neolithic pottery. One case contains intact pottery, bronze weapons, and stone tools from a pair of richly furnished Mycenaean chamber tombs excavated at Armenochori (approximately 0.5 km (0.3 mi) west of the chapel of Agios Panteleimonas).

At Kylindra, on the west flank of the castle hill, a unique graveyard has been excavated by the Greek archaeological service. At least 2700 newborns and small children, below the age of two, were buried in ceramic pots between approximately 750 BC and Roman times. Since 2000, a team from University College London has undertaken systematic study of these remains and those of a contemporary cemetery for adults and older children excavated at Katsalos nearby.

Kylindra was first excavated in 1996 by the 22nd Ephorate of Prehistoric and Classical Antiquities, who dated Kylindra from the Late Archaic to the Early Classical periods, and is also the largest child and infant cemetery in the world. They dated the nearby adult cemetery, Katsalos, from the Geometric to the Roman Period. Skeletal remains of infants are rare amongst most cemetery excavations; Ancient Greeks buried their infants in trade pots, such as amphorae, which contributed to the preservation of the remains from Kylindra. The collection of child and infant remains is currently housed at University College London, where the growth and development of the children and infants through development of tissues, bones, teeth structures are studied.

The well-preserved mosaic floor of an early Christian basilica, decorated with geometric designs, lies underneath the chapel of Agia Varvara about 700 meters north of the small port of Analipsi (Maltezana). Its monolithic columns and marble column bases were evidently reused from a Hellenistic or Roman-period religious building nearby. A few meters east of the harbor of Analipsi, at a site known as Tallaras, are the remains of a late Roman-era bath. Its mosaic floors, including a Helios surrounded by the signs of the Zodiac, have been reburied by the Greek Archaeological Service (as of 9/2013), but photographs are on display at the museum. Mosaic floor fragments remain in situ at the ruined early Christian basilicas of Karekli (Schoinountas) and Agios Vasilios (south of Livadi).

Road signs lead to the inconspicuous, inaccessible remains of a pre-Venetian fortification on Mount Patelos opposite the monastery of Agios Ioannis at the western extreme of Astypalaia.

=== Treaty with Rome ===
Astypalaia's treaty with Rome, made in 105 BC, has survived in an inscription found on the island. A noteworthy feature of this treaty is its formal assumption of sovereign equality between Rome and Astypalaia: the Astypalaians would not aid the enemies of the Romans or allow such enemies passage through their territory, and likewise the Romans would not aid the enemies of the Astypalaians or allow such enemies passage through their territory; in case of an attack on Astypalaia, the Romans would come to its aid, in case of an attack on Rome the Astypalaians would come to its aid; etc. Rome at the end of the second century BC still maintained the forms - if not the substance - of reciprocity in its dealings with Greek city-states. Since there was no reason for the Romans to single out Astypalaia for such formal courtesy, it is assumed that this treaty followed a standard formula used in treaties with other Greek city states, whose texts did not survive.

=== Electric island ===
In 2023, the Greek government announced an agreement with the Volkswagen Group to transform Astypalaia into "a model island for climate-neutral mobility", as a laboratory for developing sustainable mobility. Substantial grants will be given to replace cars and vans with electric vehicles, and ride-sharing and demand-responsive transport will be introduced. To support this, a 3.5 megawatt photovoltaic power station with battery storage will be built.

== Ecclesiastical history ==
Astypalaea became a Christian bishopric and is mentioned as such in a 10th-century Notitia Episcopatuum. It was a suffragan of the Metropolitan Roman Catholic Archdiocese of Rhodes, the capital of the Aegean Insulae province.

=== Titular Latin Catholic see ===
As a diocese that is no longer residential, it is listed in the Annuario Pontificio among titular sees.

In 1933 it was nominally restored Titular bishopric under the name of Astypalæa.

It has been vacant for decades, having had a single incumbent of the lowest (episcopal) rank :

- Titular Bishop James Buis, Mill Hill Missionaries (M.H.M.) (1952.02.14 – 1980.04.24), Apostolic Vicar of Kota Kinabalu (Malaysia) (1947.01.18 – 1972).

== Notable people ==
- Kleomedes of Astypalaia (fl. 496 – c. 492 BC), Ancient Greek boxer
- Onesicritus (c. 360 – c. 290 BC), historian and traveler
- Frank Skartados (1956–2018), American politician and businessman
- Evdokia Anagnostou, professor and inaugural Dr. Stuart D. Sims Chair in Autism at the Holland Bloorview Kids Rehabilitation Hospital, Canada Research Chair in Translational Therapeutics in Autism Spectrum Disorder.
- Argiris Kambouris, former basketball player; he scored the two winning free throws at the final of the 1987 EuroBasket
- Anthimos Kapsis, former footballer

== See also ==
- Turna (song)

== Sources ==
- Bertarelli, L.V. (1929). Guida d'Italia, Vol. XVII. Consociazione Turistica Italiana, Milano.
