= Don Nottoli =

American politician

Member of the Sacramento County Board of Supervisors
- In office November 1994 – January 8, 2023

Chair Sacramento County Board of Supervisors
- In office January 11, 2022 – January 3, 2023
- Preceded by: Sue Frost
- Succeeded by: Rich Desmond

Vice Chair Sacramento County Board of Supervisors
- In office January 8, 2021 – January 11, 2022
- Preceded by: Sue Frost
- Succeeded by: Rich Desmond

Personal details
- Party: Democratic
- Education: California State University, Sacramento (BA)

Don Nottoli is a retired American politician who served as a member of the Sacramento County Board of Supervisors from November 1994 to January 2023. A Democrat, he served as chief of staff to his predecessor, Toby Johnson. Nottoli was elected to the Galt City Council in 1978.

== Early life and education ==
Don Nottoli attended a local high school in Sacramento County and earned a Bachelor of Arts degree in Government and Journalism from California State University, Sacramento.

== Career ==
Nottoli served five terms since being elected in 1994 to represent the Fifth District. He represented the Fifth District, a 650-square-mile area. The cities included in the Fifth District include Elk Grove, Galt, Isleton, and Rancho Cordova. A significant portion of the Fifth District is unincorporated, rural communities. The Fifth District is also known to be the most ethnically diverse in the county.

Nottoli has worked to address issues in his community including roads, traffic, drainage, water supply, land use, health programs, social services, law enforcement, recreational programs, cultural programs, the county budget, and programs helping children, families, and seniors.

Throughout his long career as a County Supervisor, Nottoli served on numerous boards and commissions, including: the Delta Protection Commission, Delta Stewardship Council, Sacramento Area Flood Control Agency, Sacramento Cable Commission, Sacramento Metropolitan Air Quality Management District, Sacramento Public Library Authority, Solid Waste Authority, Sacramento Transportation Authority, Basinwide Air Pollution Control Council, Sacramento Regional Transit District, and the Sacramento Adult and Aging Commission, among others.

== Personal life ==
Nottoli and his wife reside in rural Sacramento County.
