= Agate Bay, Carnelian Bay =

Agate Bay , California
- neighborhood
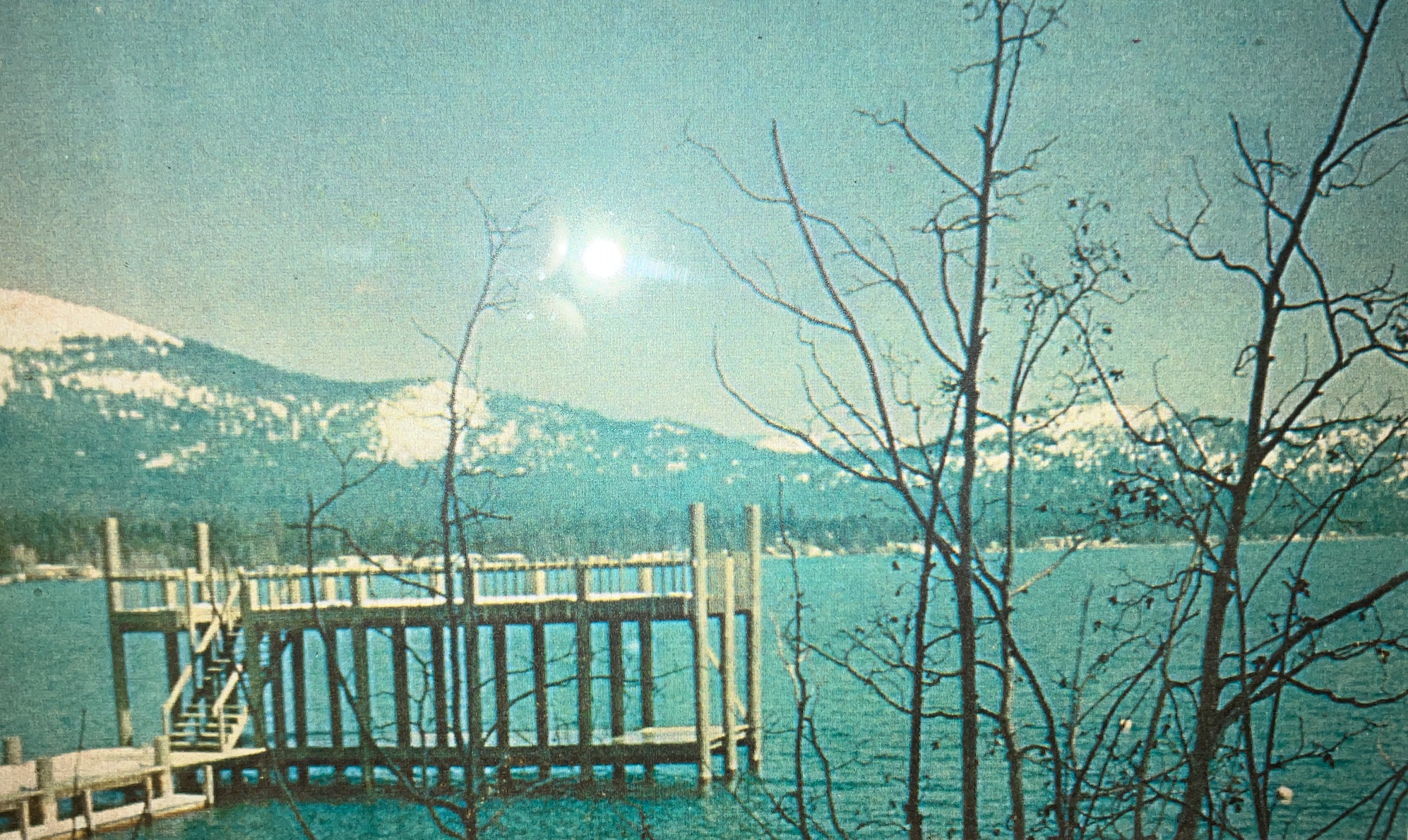
- Dock in Agate Bay California ca 1970

- Location of Agate Bay in Placer County, California.

- Location within the United States
- Coordinates: 39°13′58″N 120°04′54″W
- Country: United States
- State: California
- County: Placer
- Elevation: 6,325 ft (1,928 m)
- Time zone: UTC-8 (Pacific (PST))
  - Summer (DST): UTC-7 (PDT)
- ZIP Code: 96140
- Area code: 530

Agate Bay is a housing subdivision on north Lake Tahoe within the Carnelian Bay CDP (census designated place). It consists of around 650 residential properties between Sahara Drive and Granite Road. The Agate Pier and Swim Club operates a club of over 400 members with a dock and buoys on California State Route 28, pool and volleyball on Agate road, and tennis courts on Victoria road. Water is provided by the Agate Bay Water Company. For decades, the community has come together for a Fourth-of-July parade and BBQ. Agate Bay is a Firewise USA ® community. The bay is occasionally ideal for winter surfing.

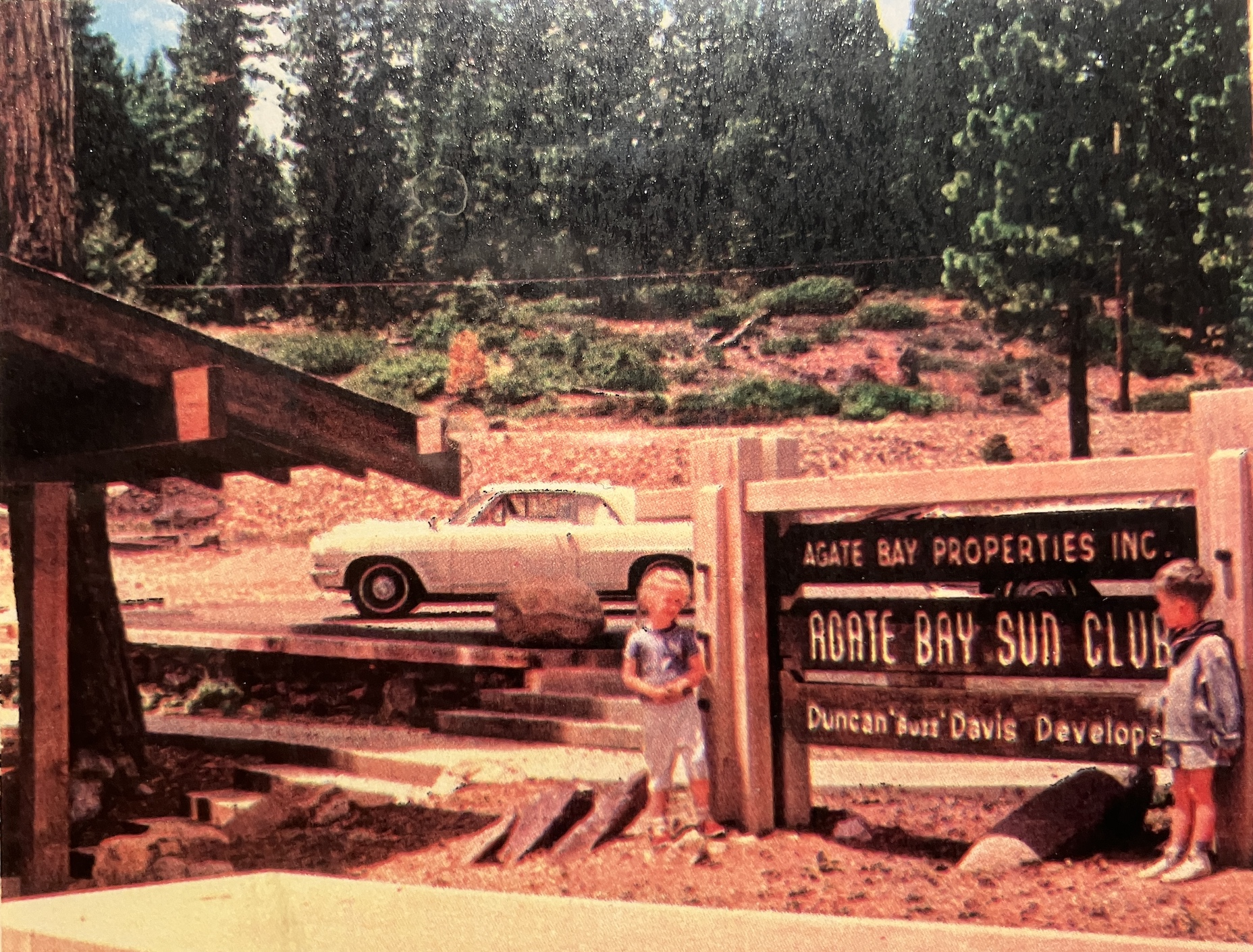
Sign at Agate Bay Sun Club ca 1970

Duncan “Buzz” Davis developed Agate Bay starting in the 1950’s, and was the key to building a community around the dock, pool, and tennis courts. Group activities such as trips to Sand Harbor, rafting down the Truckee, and Go-Cart races were ways that Davis created an environment for families, and especially children, to enjoy Lake Tahoe. Games at the pool continue to include the penny toss, big guess, and bingo with prizes from the ice cream shop. The development has many streets named with an African theme, such as Nile and Sahara.
