= Cedar Flat, California =

Cedar Flat Hots'i'nakčʰa xotai (Chimariko)
- Unincorporated community Census-designated place
- Location within California Location within the United States
- Coordinates: 39°12′36″N 120°5′47″W
- Country: United States
- State: California
- County: Placer

Area
  - Total: 1.22 sq mi (3.17 km^{2})
  - Land: 1.08 sq mi (2.80 km^{2})
  - Water: 0.15 sq mi (0.38 km^{2})
- Elevation: 6,430 ft (1,960 m)

Population (2020)
  - Total: 797
  - Density: 740/sq mi (285/km^{2})
- Time zone: UTC-8 (Pacific (PST))
  - Summer (DST): UTC-7 (PDT)
- ZIP Code: 96140 (Carnelian Bay)
- Area code: 530
- FIPS code: 06-12216
- GNIS feature ID: 2805240

Cedar Flat (Chimariko: Hots'i'nakčʰa xotai) is a census-designated place (CDP) in eastern Placer County, California, United States. It is located on the northwest shore of Lake Tahoe, between Carnelian Bay to the northeast and Dollar Point to the southwest. As of the 2020 census, Cedar Flat had a population of 797. It was first listed as a CDP prior to the 2020 census.

== Demographics ==
Historical population
Census	Pop.	Note	%±
2020	797		—
U.S. Decennial Census; 1850–1870 1880-1890; 1900 1910 1920; 1930 1940 1950; 1960 1970 1980; 1990 2000 2010 2020

Cedar Flat first appeared as a census designated place in the 2020 U.S. census.

=== 2020 census ===
As of the 2020 census, Cedar Flat had a population of 797. The median age was 48.5 years. 16.4% of residents were under the age of 18 and 21.8% of residents were 65 years of age or older. For every 100 females there were 116.0 males, and for every 100 females age 18 and over there were 114.8 males age 18 and over.

100.0% of residents lived in urban areas, while 0.0% lived in rural areas.

There were 354 households in Cedar Flat, of which 21.5% had children under the age of 18 living in them. Of all households, 55.9% were married-couple households, 22.6% were households with a male householder and no spouse or partner present, and 14.7% were households with a female householder and no spouse or partner present. About 27.9% of all households were made up of individuals and 12.7% had someone living alone who was 65 years of age or older.

There were 1,035 housing units, of which 65.8% were vacant. The homeowner vacancy rate was 1.0% and the rental vacancy rate was 21.6%.

Cedar Flat CDP, California – Racial and ethnic composition Note: the US Census treats Hispanic/Latino as an ethnic category. This table excludes Latinos from the racial categories and assigns them to a separate category. Hispanics/Latinos may be of any race.
Race / Ethnicity (NH = Non-Hispanic)	Pop 2020	% 2020
White alone (NH)	718	90.09%
Black or African American alone (NH)	1	0.13%
Native American or Alaska Native alone (NH)	4	0.50%
Asian alone (NH)	8	1.00%
Pacific Islander alone (NH)	4	0.50%
Other race alone (NH)	4	0.50%
Mixed race or Multiracial (NH)	25	3.14%
Hispanic or Latino (any race)	33	4.14%
Total	797	100.00%

== Education ==
It is in the Tahoe-Truckee Unified School District.
