= Sacramento metropolitan area =

Greater Sacramento Sacramento–Roseville
- Metropolitan area
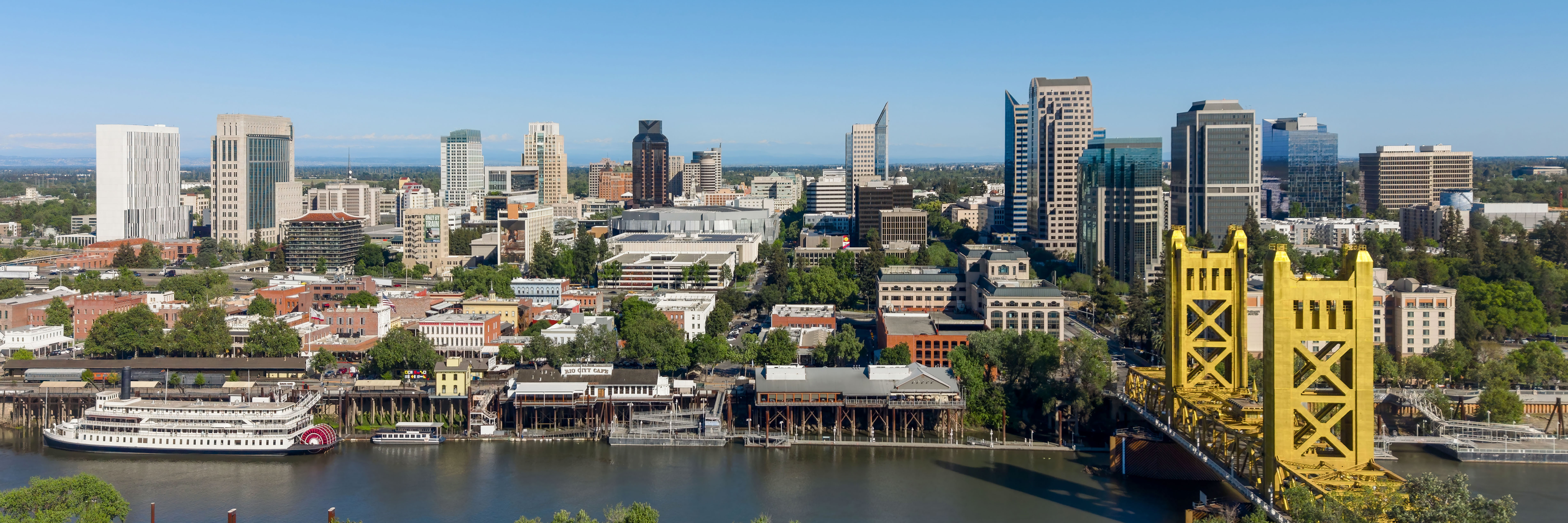
- Sacramento, California in April 2026
Map of Sacramento–Roseville, CA CSA
Sacramento–Roseville–Arden-Arcade, CA MSA
Yuba City, CA MSA
Truckee–Grass Valley, CA μSA
City of Sacramento
City of Roseville
- Country: United States
- State: California
- Principal cities: Sacramento – Elk Grove – West Sacramento – Davis – Arden-Arcade – Roseville – Yuba City – South Lake Tahoe

Area
  - Metro: 21,429.20 sq mi (55,501.37 km^{2})
- Elevation: 0–10,886 ft (0–3,318 m)

Population (2020)
  - Urban: 1,723,634 (25th)
  - Metro: 2,397,382
  - Metro density: 111.8746/sq mi (43.19501/km^{2})
  - MSA: (26th)
  - CSA: 2,680,831
- Urban = 2010

GDP
  - MSA: $160.542 billion (2021)
- Time zone: UTC−8 (PST)
  - Summer (DST): UTC−7 (PDT)

The Greater Sacramento area is a metropolitan region in Northern California comprising either the U.S. Census Bureau defined Sacramento–Roseville–Arden-Arcade metropolitan statistical area or the larger Sacramento–Roseville combined statistical area, the latter of which consists of seven counties, namely Sacramento, Yolo, Placer, El Dorado, Sutter, Yuba, and Nevada counties.

Straddling the Central Valley and Sierra Nevada regions of California, Greater Sacramento is anchored by the state capital of Sacramento, the political center of California. Greater Sacramento also contains sites of natural beauty including Lake Tahoe, the largest alpine lake in North America and numerous ski and nature resorts. It is also located in one of the world's most important agricultural areas. The region's eastern counties are located in Gold Country, site of the California Gold Rush.

Since the late 20th century, it has been one of the fastest growing urban regions in the United States as Sacramento continues to emerge as a distinct metropolitan area. In the 1990s, the metro area experienced a growth of just over 20%, with subsequent growth remaining above 10% per decade. In the 2020 Census, the metropolitan region had a population of 2,680,831.

== Regional composition ==
The Greater Sacramento area is composed of seven counties, two metropolitan statistical areas and one micropolitan area. The following counties are located in the Greater Sacramento area:

- El Dorado County, California
- Nevada County, California
- Placer County, California
- Sacramento County, California
- Sutter County, California
- Yolo County, California
- Yuba County, California

El Dorado, Placer, Sacramento, and Yolo counties comprise the Sacramento–Roseville-Folsom, California, Metropolitan Statistical Area. Sutter and Yuba counties comprise the Yuba City Metropolitan Statistical Area, known as the Yuba–Sutter area. Nevada County comprises the Truckee–Grass Valley Micropolitan Area.

== Overview ==
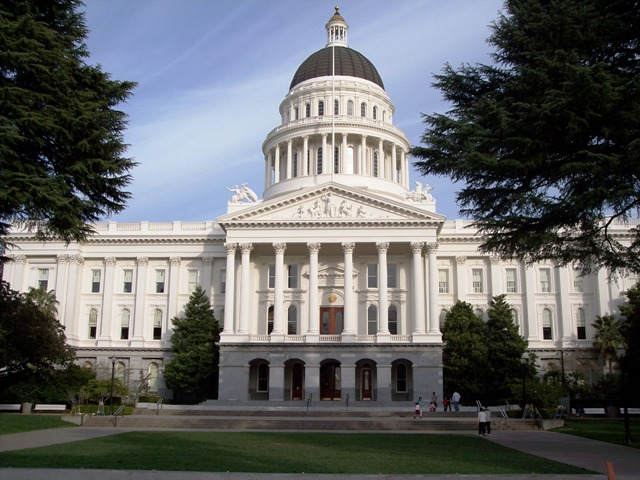
The California State Capitol Building

Greater Sacramento straddles two key regions of California, the Central Valley and the Sierra Nevada mountains and is overlapped by the cultural influences of three areas, the Bay Area, Eastern California and Northern California. An increasing phenomenon taking shape in Greater Sacramento is growth of urban sprawl as Sacramento and its metropolitan area continue to expand. The growth is due in part to first, higher costs of living in the Bay Area which have caused commuters to move as far as Yolo and Sacramento counties and more recently, growth and rising living costs in the core of Sacramento, building up more areas in the surrounding counties for commuters. Local and state governments are trying to prevent destruction of forests and open land and curbing the spread before Sacramento faces an urban sprawl crisis as the Greater Los Angeles Area has.

Sacramento is the most populous city in the metropolitan area, home to approximately 526,000 people, making it the sixth-most populous city in California and the 35th most populous in the United States. It has been the state capital of California since 1851 and has played an important role in the history of California. When gold was discovered in nearby Sutter's Mill in Coloma, Sacramento became a boom town luring in migrants making their way from San Francisco to the gold fields of the Sierras. Although it did not become the financial and cultural center of Northern California, titles that were given to San Francisco, Sacramento became the largest transportation hub of not only Northern California, but also the West Coast following the completion of the First Transcontinental Railroad. Sacramento today continues to be one of the largest rail hubs in North America, and its rail station is one of the busiest in the United States. In 2002, Time Magazine featured an article recognizing Sacramento as the most diverse and integrated city in America. Government (state and federal) jobs are still the largest sector of employment in the city and the city council does considerable effort to keep state agencies from moving outside the city limits. The remainder of Sacramento County is suburban in general with most of the working population commuting to Downtown Sacramento and with a smaller proportion commuting all the way to the Bay Area.

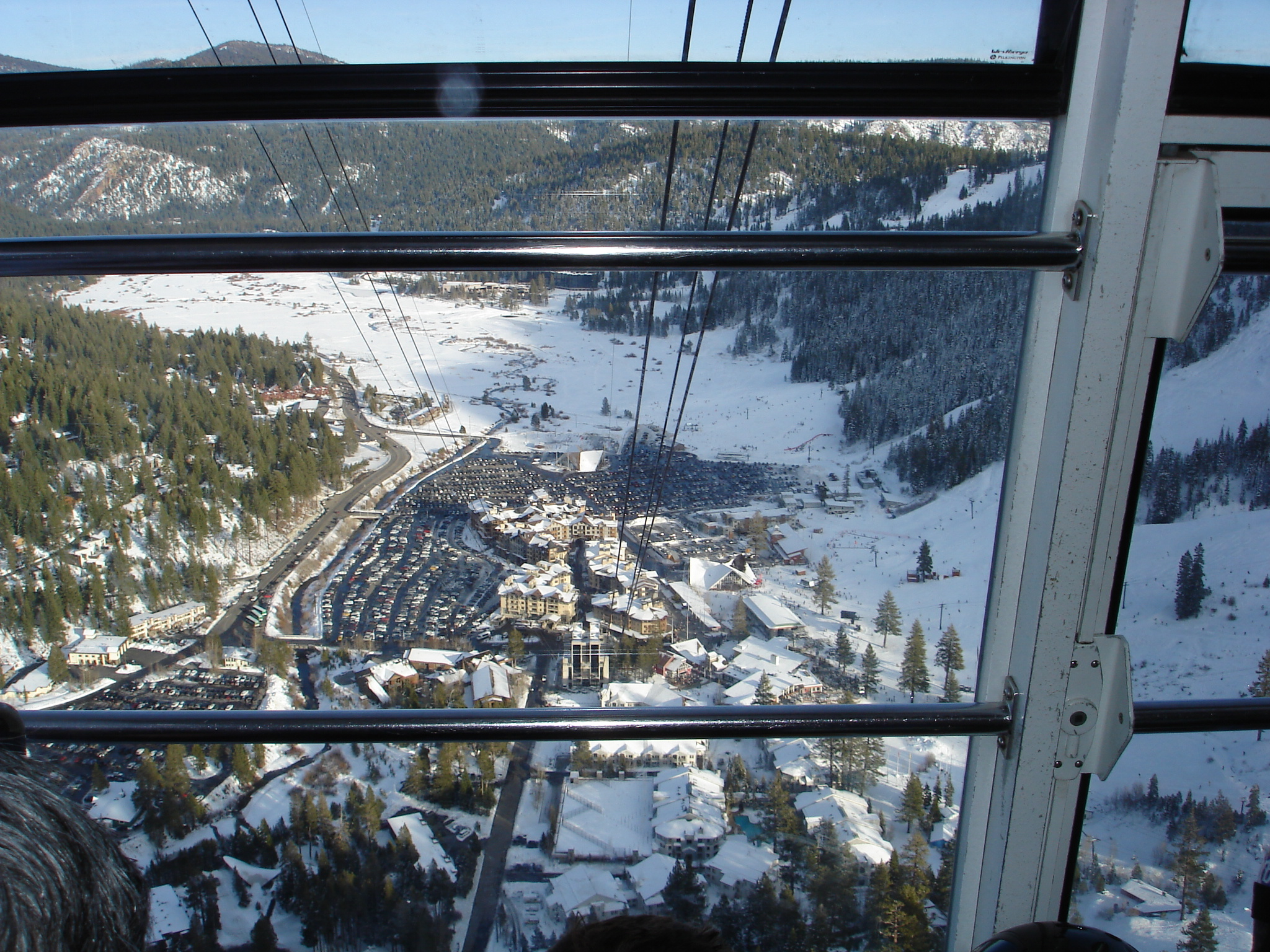
Palisades Tahoe, the site of the 1960 Winter Olympics

Yolo County is a mixture of an agricultural area and commuter region, with most of its working population commuting either to the Bay Area or Sacramento for work. It is home to the University of California, Davis, campus, the northernmost UC campus and only UC campus in the Greater Sacramento region.

El Dorado and Placer Counties form the remainder of the inner core of Greater Sacramento and are composed of the Sierra Nevada foothills and mountains. The western areas of the counties are composed of commuter suburbs, with Roseville in Placer County being Sacramento's most populous edge city. The Sierra foothills mostly contain residential acreage properties and small farms. The easternmost areas border Lake Tahoe and are home to numerous ski resorts and towns such as South Lake Tahoe, site of the Heavenly Mountain Resort, which are popular in winter months and nature camps and resorts in summer months. Placer County has been an important mining area not only for gold, but also other minerals and granite. It is also the site of Squaw Valley, which hosted the 1960 Winter Olympics, which has been up to date, the only Winter Olympic Games to be held in California and the US West Coast and the smallest city to host an Olympics.

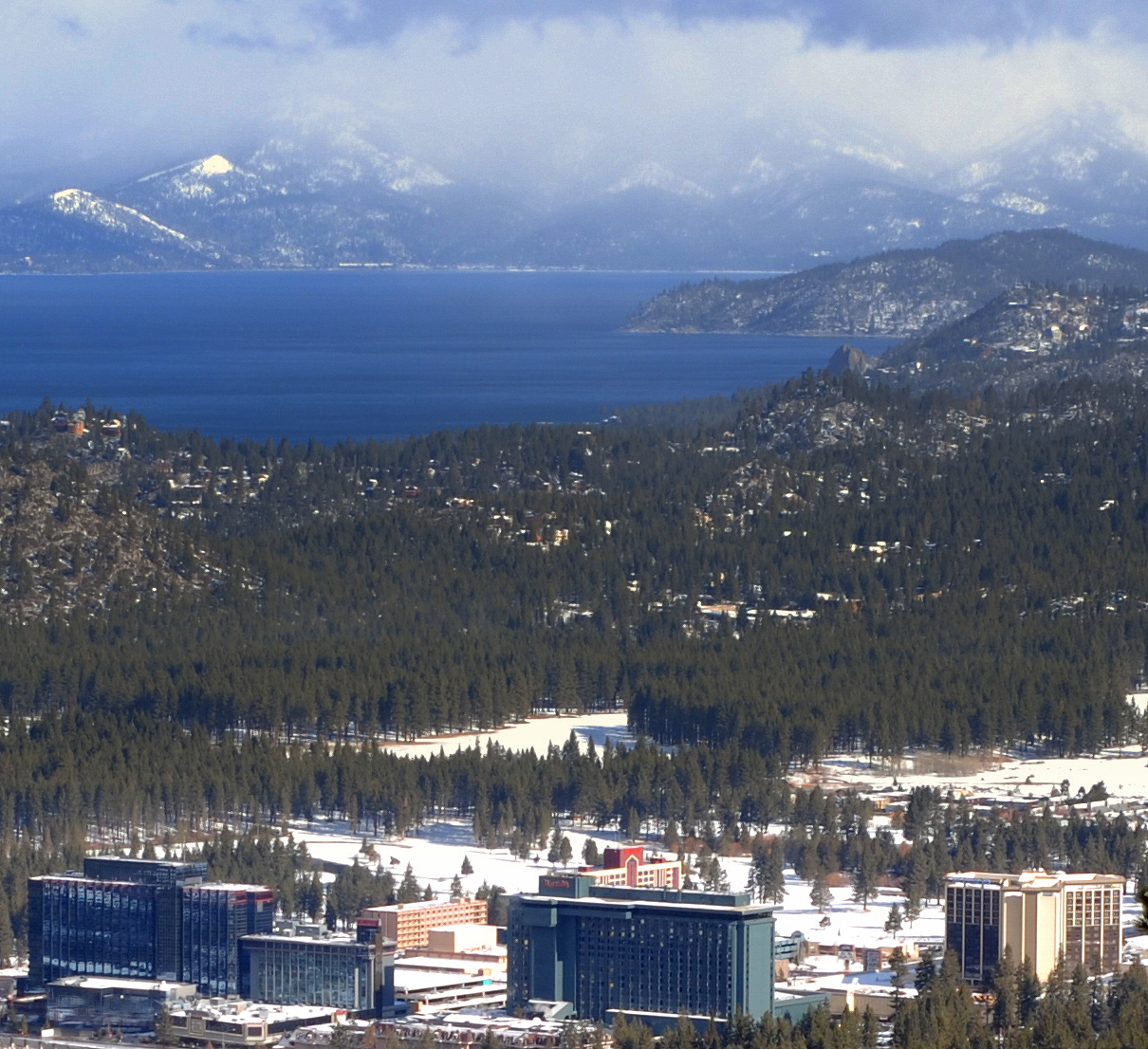
Stateline is an important Tahoe resort town on the shores of Lake Tahoe.

The Yuba–Sutter area consists of Yuba and Sutter counties and is a primarily agricultural area, although the southern area is more suburban in character. It is home to Sunsweet Growers, which owns the world's largest dried fruit plant in Yuba City. Nevada County, like El Dorado and Placer Counties, borders Lake Tahoe and contains numerous ski resorts such as the Boreal Mountain Resort, but is more rural than the former two counties and is an important gold mining area. The Donner Memorial State Park is located in the county, where the ill-fated Donner Party was trapped in winter storms in 1846–47 while attempting to make it to California on a poorly organized trip.

Douglas County, Nevada was recently briefly added to the Sacramento Combined Statistical Area. As Greater Sacramento continues to grow beyond its inner region, Western Nevada continues to be influenced by Sacramento and California and their cultures. However, Douglas County has since been removed again from the Sacramento CSA, and transferred to the Reno-Carson City-Fernley, NV CSA.

== Geography and climate ==
=== Geography ===
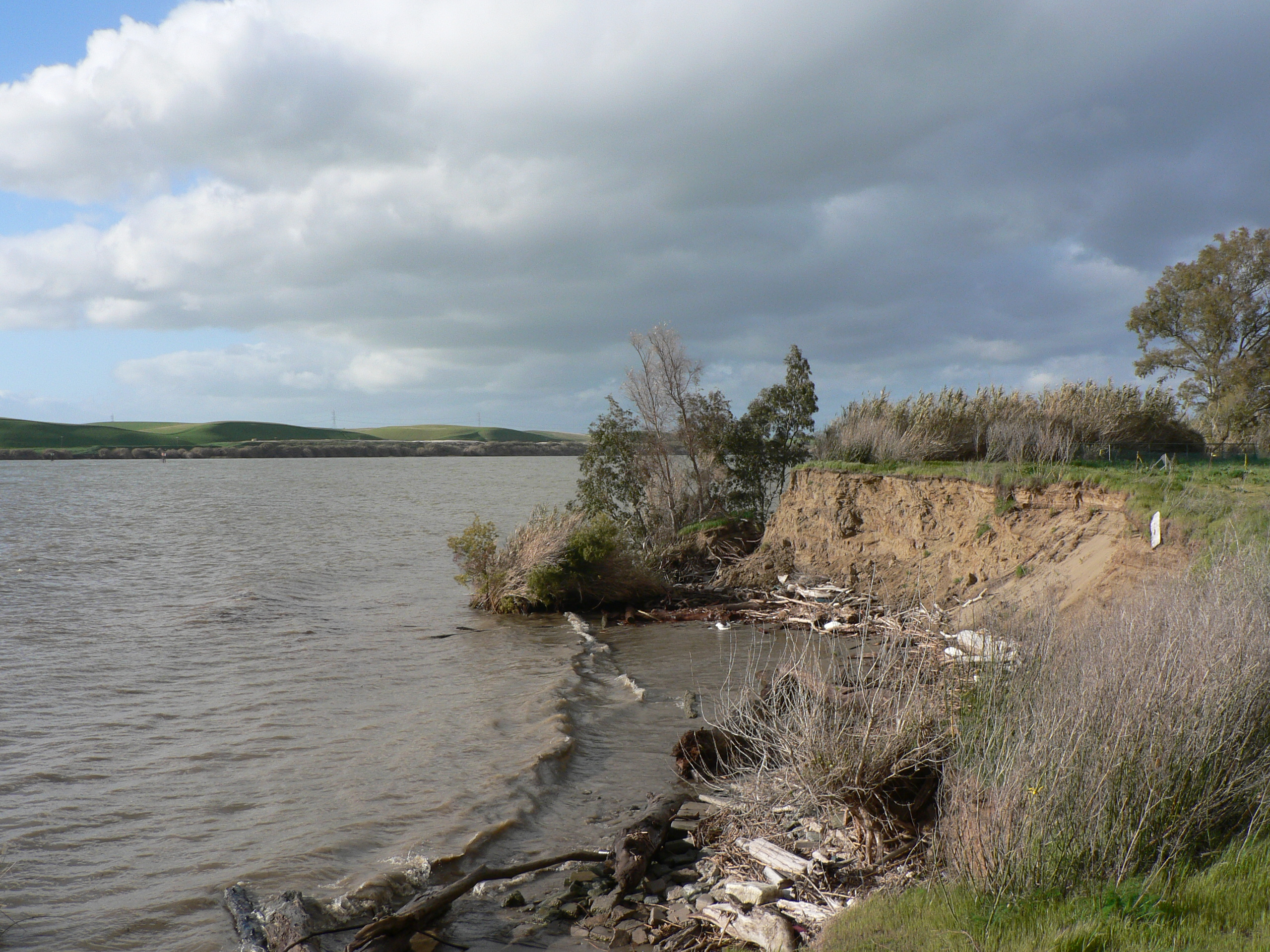
A cove inside the Sacramento River delta

The western half of Greater Sacramento is centered on the Central Valley, one of the most vital agricultural areas in the country. The Sierra Nevada and its foothills compose the eastern portion of the region. Yolo County contains a large flood control basin. The Sacramento River and the American River are major rivers that form a deepwater port connected to the San Francisco Bay by a channel through the Sacramento River Delta. Coniferous and oak-dominated woodland are prevalent in the Sierra Nevada and the Lake Tahoe area.

=== Climate ===
Sacramento and the valley area have a Mediterranean climate (Köppen Csa), characterized by damp to wet, cool winters and hot, dry summers. The wet season is generally October through April. Summer heat is often moderated by a sea breeze known as the "delta breeze" which comes through the Sacramento–San Joaquin River Delta from the San Francisco Bay. January is the coolest month for the entire region with an average maximum of 41.0 °F (5.0 °C) and an average minimum of 15.1 °F (-9.4 °C) in Lake Tahoe.

The eastern portion of Greater Sacramento experiences a more varied climate with 90 °F (32.2 °C) temperatures in August to below freezing temperatures in winter. In higher elevations, freezing temperatures have been recorded every month. In the winter, below freezing temperatures are common in Sacramento and lower valley elevations although snowfall is scarce and usually melts on ground contact with significant snowfall occurring roughly every 3–5 years. However, blizzard conditions in winter storms can be common in the higher elevations.

== Communities ==
=== Incorporated places ===
- Places with more than 500,000 inhabitants
  - Sacramento
- Places with 100,000 to 200,000 inhabitants
  - Elk Grove
  - Roseville
- Places with 50,000 to 100,000 inhabitants
  - Citrus Heights
  - Davis
  - Folsom
  - Rancho Cordova
  - Rocklin
  - West Sacramento
  - Woodland
  - Yuba City

- Places with 10,000 to 50,000 inhabitants
  - Auburn
  - Galt
  - Grass Valley
  - Lincoln
  - Marysville
  - Placerville
  - South Lake Tahoe
  - Truckee
- Places with fewer than 10,000 inhabitants
  - Colfax
  - Isleton
  - Live Oak
  - Loomis
  - Nevada City
  - Wheatland
  - Winters

=== Census-designated places ===
- Alta Sierra
- Antelope
- Arden-Arcade
- Beale Air Force Base
- Challenge–Brownsville
- Cameron Park
- Carmichael
- Diamond Springs
- Dollar Point
- El Dorado Hills
- Elverta
- Esparto
- Fair Oaks
- Florin
- Foothill Farms
- Foresthill
- Fruitridge Pocket
- Georgetown
- Gold River
- Granite Bay
- Kings Beach
- La Riviera
- Lake of the Pines

- Lake Wildwood
- Lemon Hill
- Linda
- Loma Rica
- Meadow Vista
- North Auburn
- North Highlands
- Olivehurst
- Orangevale
- Parkway
- Penn Valley
- Plumas Lake
- Pollock Pines
- Rancho Murieta
- Rio Linda
- Rosemont
- Shingle Springs
- South Yuba City
- Sunnyside–Tahoe City
- Sutter
- Tahoe Vista
- Tierra Buena
- Vineyard
- Walnut Grove
- Wilton

== Demographics ==
Historical population
Census	Pop.	Note	%±
1900	45,915		—
1910	67,806		47.7%
1920	91,029		34.2%
1930	141,999		56.0%
1940	170,333		20.0%
1950	277,140		62.7%
1960	654,893		136.3%
1970	844,425		28.9%
1980	1,099,814		30.2%
1990	1,481,102		34.7%
2000	1,796,857		21.3%
2010	2,149,127		19.6%
2020	2,397,382		11.6%
U.S. Decennial Census; 1790–1960 1900–1990; 1990–2000

As of the 2020 census, there were 2,397,382 people residing within the MSA. The racial makeup was 52.5% White, 7.0% Black, 1.1% American Indian, 14.9% Asian, 0.9% Pacific Islander, 10.4% Other and 13.2% Two or More Races. 22.2% identified as Hispanic or Latino.

The median income for a household in the MSA in 2000 was $48,401, and the median income for a family was $57,112. Males had a median income of $43,572 versus $31,889 for females. The per capita income for the MSA was $23,508.

County	2025 Estimate	2020 Census	Change	Area	Density
Sacramento County	1,618,460	1,585,055	+2.11%	964.64 sq mi (2,498.4 km^{2})	1,678/sq mi (648/km^{2})
Placer County	442,081	404,739	+9.23%	1,407.01 sq mi (3,644.1 km^{2})	314/sq mi (121/km^{2})
Yolo County	224,410	216,403	+3.70%	1,014.69 sq mi (2,628.0 km^{2})	221/sq mi (85/km^{2})
El Dorado County	192,323	191,185	+0.60%	1,707.88 sq mi (4,423.4 km^{2})	113/sq mi (43/km^{2})
Total	2,477,274	2,397,382	+3.33%	5,094.22 sq mi (13,194.0 km^{2})	486/sq mi (188/km^{2})

== Transportation ==
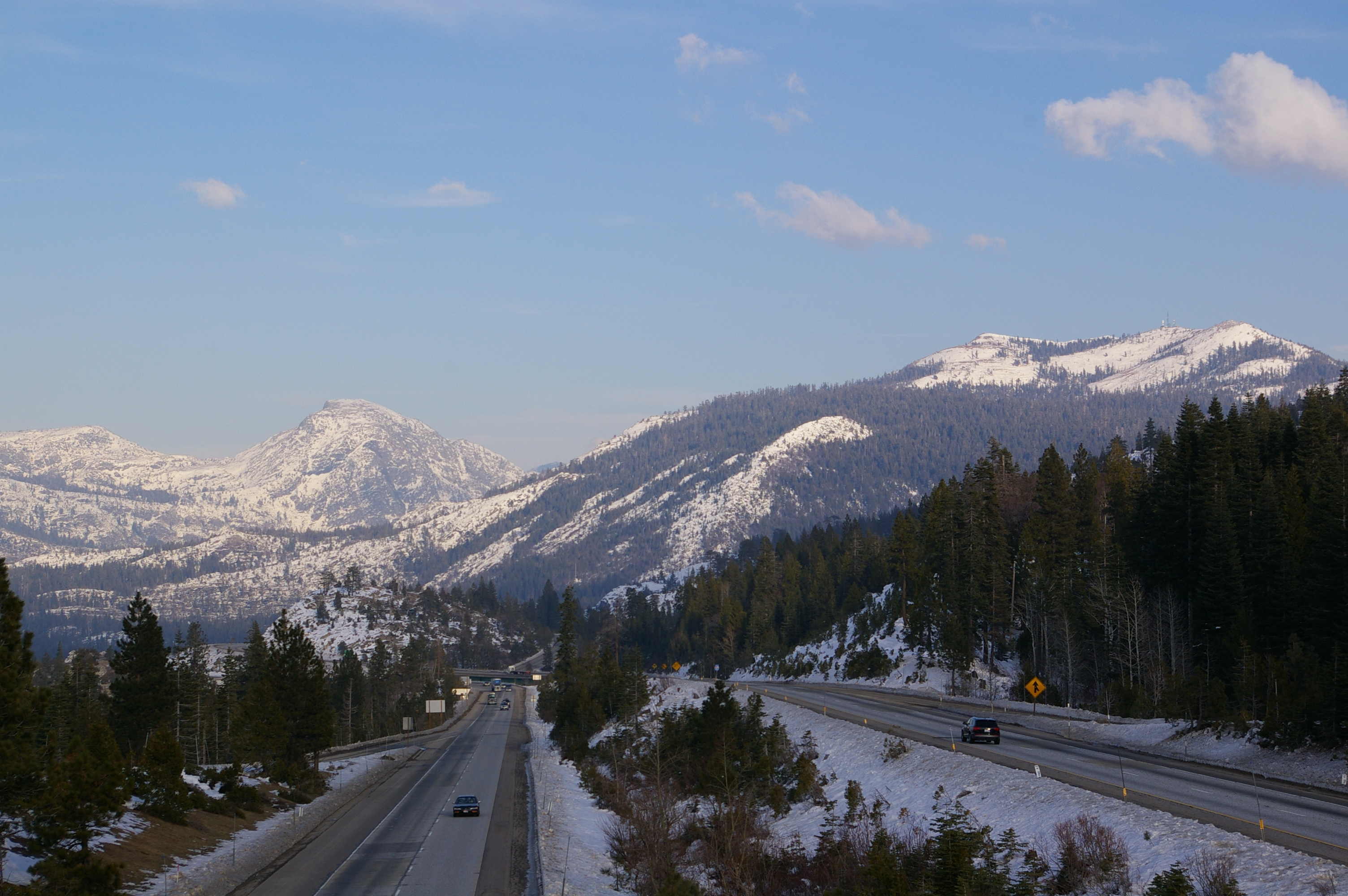
Interstate 80 near the Donner Summit in wintertime

Owing to its central location between the Bay Area and Nevada border, Greater Sacramento is a key transportation hub into Northern California. While the region doesn't have as extensive a public transportation system as the San Francisco Bay Area, Greater Sacramento has had an earlier history of public mass transit and is served by a vast freeway system as well as some light rail.

=== Freeways and highways ===
Sacramento is served by numerous highways. Five highways merge in the Capital City Corridor, serving the immediate downtown Sacramento area. The major freeways of the Greater Sacramento area are Interstate 80, US Route 50, Interstate 5, and State Route 99, which serve the northern Tahoe area, southern Tahoe area, and valley areas, respectively, as well as forming the Capital City Corridor along with Interstate 80 Business. Outside downtown Sacramento, there is only one principal route that serves its respective area and there are smaller state routes as well. Freeways and highways in the Greater Sacramento areas include:

- Interstate 5
- Interstate 80
- Interstate 505
- U.S. Route 50
- U.S. Route 395
- Interstate 80 Business
- California State Route 12
- California State Route 16
- California State Route 20
- California State Route 28
- California State Route 45

- California State Route 49
- California State Route 65
- California State Route 70
- California State Route 89
- California State Route 99
- California State Route 104
- California State Route 113
- California State Route 128
- California State Route 160
- California State Route 174
- California State Route 193

- California State Route 220
- California State Route 244
- California State Route 267

=== Rail ===
Sacramento was the largest rail hub west of the Mississippi River and was the first terminus of the First transcontinental railroad before it extended to Oakland. The Sacramento Valley Station is the largest train station in the region, near Old Sacramento, and is connected by the Coast Starlight, California Zephyr, Gold Runner, Capitol Corridor and Amtrak Thruway Amtrak routes. The Sacramento Regional Transit District is the local transit agency for Sacramento County and operates three light rail routes, the Blue Line, Green Line, and Gold Line, along 42.9 mi (69 km) of right of way that serve Sacramento and its immediate suburbs. Other train stations in the Greater Sacramento area are Davis, Roseville, Rocklin, Auburn, Colfax and Truckee.

=== Air ===
The main airport servicing Greater Sacramento is the Sacramento International Airport north of downtown while the Sacramento Mather Airport, Sacramento McClellan Airport, Sacramento Executive Airport and Minden–Tahoe Airports provide general aviation. The Reno-Tahoe International Airport in Reno provides more direct access to Lake Tahoe than Sacramento International. For a wider range of destinations, residents must travel down to San Francisco International Airport, the largest airport in Northern California and 10th largest in the United States.

=== Bus ===
Greater Sacramento is served by extensive bus systems that link the region to the Reno and Bay Area metropolitan areas. The Sacramento Regional Transit District operates bus lines in Sacramento County and Yolobus serves Yolo County while providing connections to downtown Sacramento and northern Solano County in the Bay Area. El Dorado Transit links El Dorado County with downtown Sacramento and the city's western suburbs. Placer County Transit and Roseville Transit link Sacramento with Placer County with the latter providing direct connection from Roseville to Sacramento. The Yuba-Sutter Transit provides bus service in the Yuba–Sutter area and direct connection to downtown Sacramento on weekdays. Gold Country Stage and Tahoe Truckee Area Rapid Transit serve Nevada County and transfer service to Auburn to Sacramento is provided. Greyhound, Megabus, Flixbus, and Amtrak provide long-distance bus lines to Greater Sacramento.

== Higher education ==
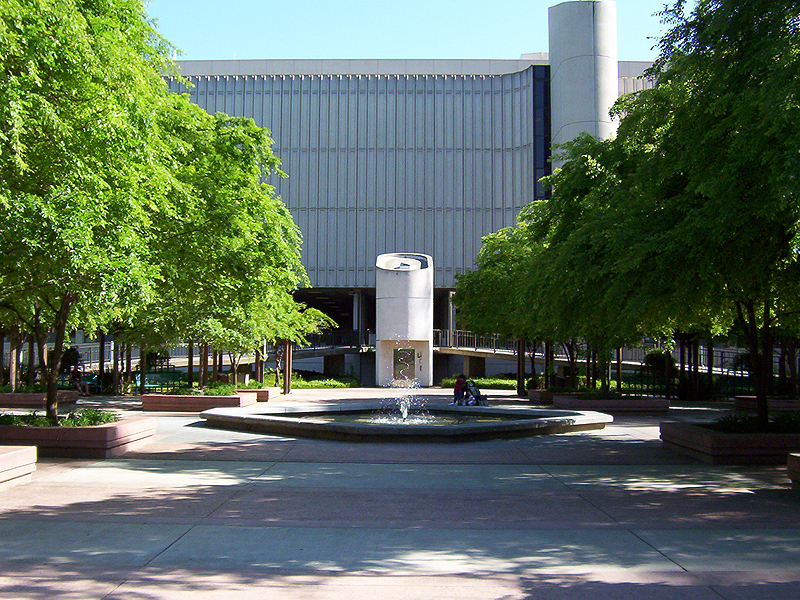
The Sacramento State library

Greater Sacramento's higher education system consists of the northernmost University of California campus, University of California, Davis, and the California State University, Sacramento ("Sac State"), as well as several community colleges in the region.

Community colleges:
- American River College
- Cosumnes River College
- Folsom Lake College
- Lake Tahoe Community College
- Sacramento City College
- Sierra College
- Woodland Community College
- Yuba College

California State University:

- California State University, Sacramento

University of California:

- UC Davis

Private:

- Alliant International University
- Drexel University (Sacramento campus)
- Lincoln Law School of Sacramento
- McGeorge School of Law (part of University of the Pacific)
- National University
- University of Northern California, Lorenzo Patiño School of Law
- University of Phoenix - Sacramento Valley Campus
- University of the Pacific, Sacramento Campus
- William Jessup University

== Politics ==
Greater Sacramento vote by party in presidential elections
Year	GOP	DEM	Others
2024	43.58% 535,074	53.12% 652,155	3.30% 40,535
2020	41.38% 539,853	56.10% 731,852	2.52% 32,914
2016	39.49% 409,624	51.84% 537,727	8.67% 89,954
2012	45.12% 431,159	51.89% 495,768	2.99% 28,555
2008	43.98% 439,717	53.66% 536,530	2.36% 23,551
2004	53.37% 488,703	45.33% 415,141	1.30% 11,920
2000	49.92% 394,935	44.58% 352,677	5.49% 43,448
1996	44.11% 309,442	46.13% 323,652	9.76% 68,456
1992	36.85% 279,776	41.06% 311,743	22.08% 167,648
1988	53.00% 340,727	45.63% 293,284	1.37% 8,780
1984	57.46% 338,935	41.11% 242,505	1.43% 8,467

In addition to being home of the state capital of California, Greater Sacramento is considered a politically competitive area with no major political party having a majority over the region. Sacramento and Yolo counties have large Democratic pluralities and have had Democratic majorities since the 2008 presidential election, attributed to the former county being mainly urban and the latter home to the strongly Democratic university town of Davis. El Dorado, Placer, Yuba, and Sutter counties are predominantly Republican while Nevada County, despite a history of being held by Republican candidates, reflects the metropolitan area's competitiveness with pluralities between the two major parties.

== Sports teams ==
=== Professional sports ===
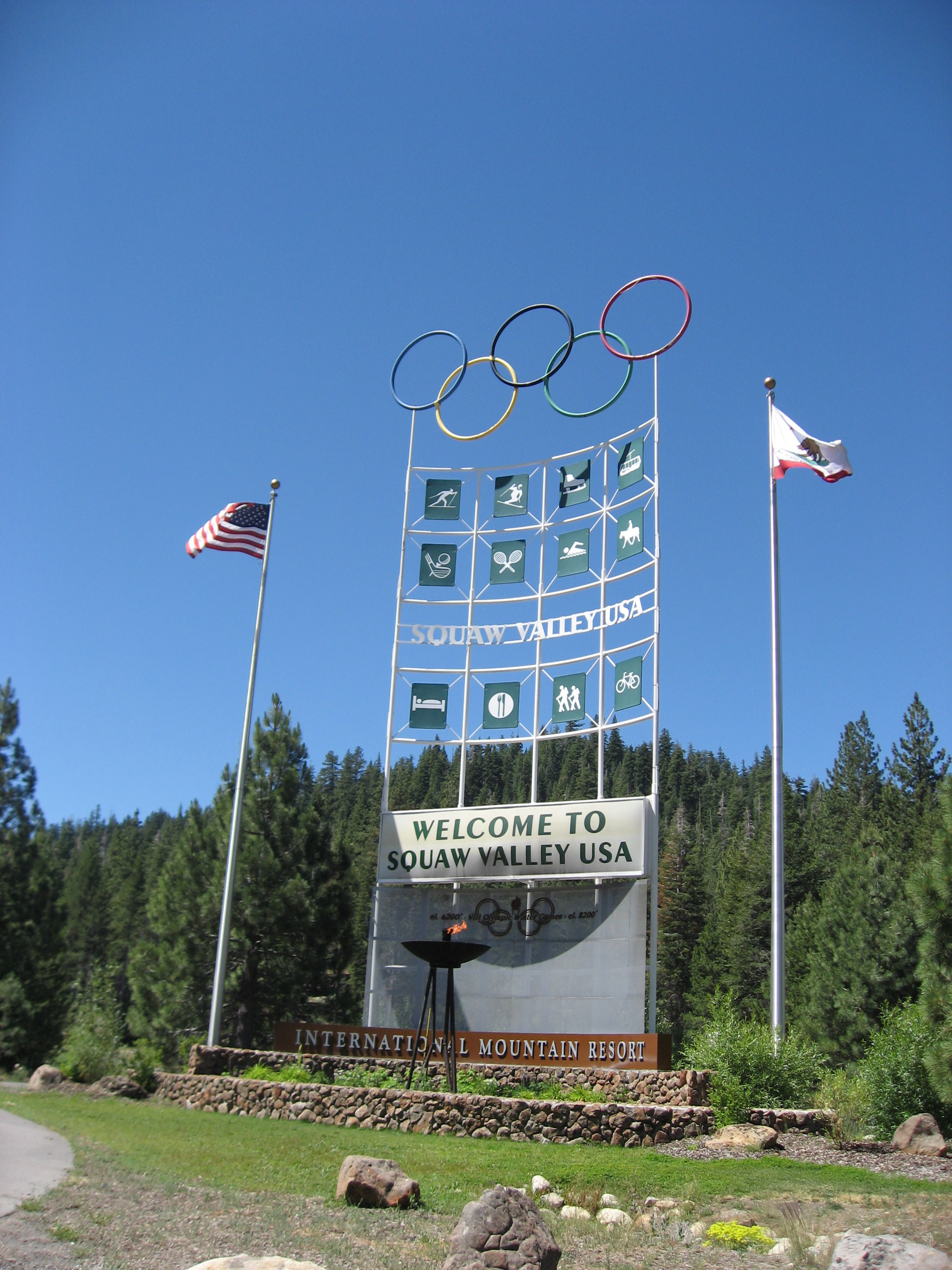
The Olympics Sign at Squaw Valley

The only major professional sports team based in the Greater Sacramento area are the Sacramento Kings, who play at Golden 1 Center in Downtown Sacramento. The Athletics, who are relocating from Oakland to Las Vegas, will temporarily play at Sutter Health Park from 2025 to 2027 (with an option for 2028) until their new stadium in Las Vegas is completed.

Prior to 2009, the Sacramento Monarchs of the Women's National Basketball Association (WNBA) were also based at the Sleep Train Arena (then known as ARCO Arena), and were one of the most successful WNBA teams until the team folded.

Greater Sacramento is the only metropolitan area in California to have ever hosted a Winter Olympic Games when Squaw Valley hosted the 1960 Winter Olympics, becoming the smallest city to ever host an Olympic Games, a title it still holds. Squaw Valley was the second Olympic games hosted in California and the only one not held in Los Angeles, where the 1932 and 1984 Summer Olympics were hosted and was the only Winter Olympics held west of the Mississippi River until the 2002 Winter Olympics in Salt Lake City.

=== Minor league teams ===
Greater Sacramento is also home to minor or secondary league sports teams. Sacramento Republic FC is a soccer team that plays in the USL Championship at Heart Health Park, which is located on the grounds of Cal Expo. A new stadium in downtown Sacramento is planned to be completed ahead of the club's move to Major League Soccer (MLS).

The Sacramento River Cats are a triple-A baseball team affiliated with the San Francisco Giants. The team plays in West Sacramento at Sutter Health Park, which is located just across the Sacramento River from downtown Sacramento.

Team	Sport	League	Venue
Sacramento Republic FC	Soccer	USL Championship	Papa Murphy's Park
Sacramento River Cats	Baseball	Pacific Coast League	Sutter Health Park

NCAA Division I College Sports

- Sacramento State Hornets
- UC Davis Aggies

== See also ==
- California census statistical areas
- Northern California
- San Francisco Bay Area
