= Placer Hills Union Elementary School District =

School district in California, United States

Placer Hills Union Elem Sch Dist

Location
- PO Box 68; Meadow Vista, California 95722 United States

Other information
- Website: www.phusd.k12.ca.us

Placer Hills Union Elementary School District is a public school district based in Placer County, California, United States.
