= Sunnyside, Placer County, California =

Unincorporated community in California, United States

Sunnyside
- Unincorporated community
- Location in California Sunnyside (the United States)
- Coordinates: 39°08′36″N 120°09′13″W
- Country: United States
- State: California
- County: Placer County
- Elevation: 6,260 ft (1,908 m)

Sunnyside is an unincorporated community in Placer County, California. Sunnyside is located on Lake Tahoe, 2 miles (3.2 km) south-southwest of Tahoe City. It lies at an elevation of 6260 feet (1908 m).

Sunnyside is combined with Tahoe City for census purposes into Sunnyside-Tahoe City, California census-designated place (CDP).
