= Tierra Buena, California =

Unincorporated community in California, United States

Tierra Buena
- Former census-designated place
- Location in Sutter County and the state of California
- Coordinates: 39°8′59″N 121°40′17″W
- Country: United States
- State: California
- County: Sutter

Area
  - Total: 3.4 sq mi (8.9 km^{2})
  - Land: 3.4 sq mi (8.9 km^{2})
  - Water: 0 sq mi (0 km^{2})
- Elevation: 59 ft (18 m)

Population (2004)
  - Total: 5,436
  - Density: 1,335/sq mi (515.4/km^{2})
- Time zone: UTC-8 (Pacific (PST))
  - Summer (DST): UTC-7 (PDT)
- 95993: 95993
- Area code: 530
- FIPS code: 06-78680
- GNIS feature ID: 1659999

Tierra Buena (Spanish for "Good Land") was a census-designated place (CDP) in Sutter County, California, United States. It was part of the Yuba City Metropolitan Statistical Area within the Greater Sacramento CSA. The population was 4,587 at the 2000 census, and the CDP has a total area of 3.4 square miles (8.8 km^{2}), all land.

The CDP was abolished prior to the 2010 census.

== Demographics ==
As of the census of 2000, there were 4,587 people, 1,598 households, and 1,289 families residing in the CDP. The population density was 1,336.4 inhabitants per square mile (516.0/km^{2}). There were 1,650 housing units at an average density of 480.7 per square mile (185.6/km^{2}). The racial makeup of the CDP was 75.84% White, 1.29% African American, 1.20% Native American, 11.49% Asian, 0.17% Pacific Islander, 5.91% from other races, and 4.10% from two or more races. Hispanic or Latino of any race were 10.62% of the population.

There were 1,598 households, of which 35.7% had children under the age of 18 living with them, 68.6% were married couples living together, 8.0% had a female householder with no husband present, and 19.3% were non-families. 14.8% of all households consisted of individuals, and 6.9% had someone living alone who was 65 years of age or older. The average household size was 2.87, and the average family size was 3.16.

In the CDP, the population was spread out, with 26.7% under the age of 18, 6.5% from 18 to 24, 26.8% from 25 to 44, 26.6% from 45 to 64, and 13.4% who were 65 years of age or older. The median age was 38 years. For every 100 females, there were 102.1 males. For every 100 females aged 18 and over, there were 97.8 males.

The median income for a household in the CDP was $52,358, and the median income for a family was $59,009. Males had a median income of $38,897 versus $30,372 for females. The per capita income for the CDP was $20,998. About 5.2% of families and 7.2% of the population were below the poverty line, including 9.5% of those under age 18 and 6.1% of those age 65 or over.

== Media ==
MySYtv.com provides television coverage of local events in the area.

== Additional information ==
Some parts of the Tierra Buena CDP have been annexed by the City of Yuba City since 2001 and are therefore within that city's official limits; however, some territory remains unincorporated.
