= Dollar Point, California =

- Census-designated place
- Location in Placer County and the State of California

- Location in the United States
- Coordinates: 39°11′25″N 120°06′52″W
- Country: United States
- State: California
- County: Placer

Government
  - State senator: Marie Alvarado-Gil (R)
  - Assemblymember: Heather Hadwick (R)
  - U. S. Congress: Kevin Kiley (I)

Area
  - Total: 1.85 sq mi (4.78 km^{2})
  - Land: 1.63 sq mi (4.23 km^{2})
  - Water: 0.21 sq mi (0.54 km^{2}) 11.39%
- Elevation: 6,424 ft (1,958 m)

Population (2020)
  - Total: 1,261
  - Density: 771.2/sq mi (297.76/km^{2})
- Time zone: UTC-8 (PST)
  - Summer (DST): UTC-7 (PDT)
- ZIP code: 96145
- Area codes: 530,837
- FIPS code: 06-19455
- GNIS feature ID: 2408680

Dollar Point is a census-designated place (CDP) in Placer County, California, United States, along the northwest shore of Lake Tahoe. It is part of the Sacramento metropolitan area. The population was 1,261 at the 2020 census, up from 1,215 at the 2010 census.

== History ==
In 1884 the Glenbrook Mills logged 337 acres on a point on Lake Tahoe. In 1898 Lake Tahoe Railway and Transportation Company (D.L. Bliss) was formed and built 16 miles (26 km) of narrow gauge track into the area that became known as Dollar Point. Southern Pacific leased the track rights in 1925 and converted the tracks to Standard gauge in 1926, bought the property in 1933, and abandoned the tracks in 1943. In 1916 Lora Josephine Knight bought the point. The land was originally part of an area called Chinquapin by the Washoe Indians. Robert Dollar purchased many properties such as the 1,436 acres in Rossmoor, California and in 1927 he purchased the area that had been called "Old Lousy", "the lousy point", and Observatory Point, from Lora Knight. She became well known for building Vikingsholm Castle in 1929. She and her husband were also primary financial backers of Charles Lindbergh's non-stop solo flight across the Atlantic.

Dollar Point is located within the Sierra Nevada Mountain Range on the Northwest corner of Lake Tahoe. Carnelian Bay is on the north side, Tahoe City to the south, and Tahoe National Forest and Burton Creek State Park extends along the entire east side. State Route 28 is the only major highway access to the area and runs the length of the northwest boundary of Dollar Point. Dollar also purchased a react of land to the east of SR 28 that is now called Chinquapin development.

== Geography ==
Dollar Creek flows along the northern boundary of the area (that also contains Dollar reservoir) and Burton Creek flows along the southern boundary.

According to the United States Census Bureau, the CDP has a total area of 1.8 square miles (4.7 km^{2}), of which 1.6 square miles (4.1 km^{2}) is land and 0.2 square miles (0.52 km^{2}) is water.

== Demographics ==
Historical population
Census	Pop.	Note	%±
1990	1,449		—
2000	1,539		6.2%
2010	1,215		−21.1%
2020	1,261		3.8%
U.S. Decennial Census; 1990 2000 2010

=== 2020 census ===
As of the 2020 census, Dollar Point had a population of 1,261 and a population density of 771.3 inhabitants per square mile (297.8/km^{2}). The median age was 46.9 years. The age distribution was 207 people (16.4%) under age 18, 78 people (6.2%) aged 18 to 24, 316 people (25.1%) aged 25 to 44, 358 people (28.4%) aged 45 to 64, and 302 people (23.9%) aged 65 or older. For every 100 females, there were 100.2 males, and for every 100 females age 18 and over, there were 100.0 males age 18 and over.

100.0% of residents lived in urban areas, while 0.0% lived in rural areas. The census reported that 99.5% of the population lived in households and 0.5% were institutionalized.

There were 579 households, out of which 129 (22.3%) had children under the age of 18 living in them, 236 (40.8%) were married-couple households, 39 (6.7%) were cohabiting couple households, 164 (28.3%) had a female householder with no spouse or partner present, and 140 (24.2%) had a male householder with no spouse or partner present. 193 households (33.3%) were one person, and 96 (16.6%) were one person aged 65 or older. The average household size was 2.17. There were 324 families (56.0% of all households).

There were 1,813 housing units at an average density of 1,108.9 units per square mile (428.1 units/km^{2}), of which 579 (31.9%) were occupied and 1,234 (68.1%) were vacant. Of the occupied units, 370 (63.9%) were owner-occupied and 209 (36.1%) were occupied by renters. The homeowner vacancy rate was 2.4% and the rental vacancy rate was 27.7%.

Racial composition as of the 2020 census
Race	Number	Percent
White	1,111	88.1%
Black or African American	6	0.5%
American Indian and Alaska Native	2	0.2%
Asian	30	2.4%
Native Hawaiian and Other Pacific Islander	8	0.6%
Some other race	38	3.0%
Two or more races	66	5.2%
Hispanic or Latino (of any race)	86	6.8%

=== Income and poverty ===
In 2023, the US Census Bureau estimated that the median household income was $94,141, and the per capita income was $57,169. About 0.0% of families and 4.3% of the population were below the poverty line.

=== 2010 census ===
At the 2010 census Dollar Point had a population of 1,215. The population density was 743.6 inhabitants per square mile (287.1/km^{2}). The racial makeup of Dollar Point was 1,145 (94.2%) White, 4 (0.3%) African American, 6 (0.5%) Native American, 19 (1.6%) Asian, 0 (0.0%) Pacific Islander, 24 (2.0%) from other races, and 17 (1.4%) from two or more races. Hispanic or Latino of any race were 83 people (6.8%).

The whole population lived in households, no one lived in non-institutionalized group quarters and no one was institutionalized.

There were 571 households, 109 (19.1%) had children under the age of 18 living in them, 248 (43.4%) were opposite-sex married couples living together, 33 (5.8%) had a female householder with no husband present, 16 (2.8%) had a male householder with no wife present. There were 41 (7.2%) unmarried opposite-sex partnerships, and 2 (0.4%) same-sex married couples or partnerships. 193 households (33.8%) were one person and 59 (10.3%) had someone living alone who was 65 or older. The average household size was 2.13. There were 297 families (52.0% of households); the average family size was 2.69.

The age distribution was 188 people (15.5%) under the age of 18, 91 people (7.5%) aged 18 to 24, 321 people (26.4%) aged 25 to 44, 419 people (34.5%) aged 45 to 64, and 196 people (16.1%) who were 65 or older. The median age was 45.4 years. For every 100 females, there were 108.0 males. For every 100 females age 18 and over, there were 106.2 males.

There were 1,822 housing units at an average density of 1,115.1 per square mile, of the occupied units 363 (63.6%) were owner-occupied and 208 (36.4%) were rented. The homeowner vacancy rate was 5.4%; the rental vacancy rate was 14.3%. 764 people (62.9% of the population) lived in owner-occupied housing units and 451 people (37.1%) lived in rental housing units.

== Education ==
It is in the Tahoe-Truckee Unified School District.
