= Sheridan, California =

Sheridan
- census-designated place
- Position in California.
- Coordinates: 38°59′10″N 121°22′32″W
- Country: United States
- State: California
- County: Placer

Area
  - Total: 25.539 sq mi (66.145 km^{2})
  - Land: 25.533 sq mi (66.129 km^{2})
  - Water: 0.0058 sq mi (0.015 km^{2}) 0.02%
- Elevation: 105 ft (32 m)

Population (2020)
  - Total: 1,385
  - Density: 54.24/sq mi (20.94/km^{2})
- Time zone: UTC-8 (Pacific (PST))
  - Summer (DST): UTC-7 (PDT)
- ZIP Code: 95681
- Area codes: 530, 837
- GNIS feature ID: 2583137

Sheridan is a census-designated place in Placer County, California, United States. It is located at the western edge of the county, along State Route 65. Sheridan is 7.5 miles (12.1 km) northwest of Lincoln. The population was 1,385 at the 2020 census.

== History ==
Sheridan was originally known by the name Union Shed, before it was renamed for Philip Sheridan around the time of the American Civil War. The Sheridan post office opened in 1868, closed for a time in 1870, and re-opened.

== Governance ==
Sheridan is governed by the Placer County Board of Supervisors. The Supervisor currently elected to the Sheridan area district is Robert Weygandt. The Sheridan area has its own Municipal Advisory Committee (Sheridan MAC) which serves as an advisory board to the County's Board of Supervisors.

== Geography ==
According to the United States Census Bureau, the CDP covers an area of 25.5 square miles (66.1 km^{2}), 99.98% of it land, and 0.02% of it water.

== Climate ==
Climate data for Lincoln, California
Month	Jan	Feb	Mar	Apr	May	Jun	Jul	Aug	Sep	Oct	Nov	Dec	Year
Record high °F (°C)	76 (24)	83 (28)	89 (32)	97 (36)	105 (41)	113 (45)	111 (44)	112 (44)	113 (45)	104 (40)	89 (32)	79 (26)	113 (45)
Mean daily maximum °F (°C)	55 (13)	62 (17)	68 (20)	75 (24)	83 (28)	91 (33)	97 (36)	96 (36)	90 (32)	80 (27)	65 (18)	56 (13)	77 (25)
Daily mean °F (°C)	48 (9)	53 (12)	57.5 (14.2)	64.5 (18.1)	71.5 (21.9)	79 (26)	78 (26)	79.5 (26.4)	78 (26)	68 (20)	58 (14)	48 (9)	65.3 (18.6)
Mean daily minimum °F (°C)	39 (4)	43 (6)	46 (8)	49 (9)	55 (13)	60 (16)	64 (18)	62 (17)	59 (15)	52 (11)	45 (7)	40 (4)	51 (11)
Record low °F (°C)	20 (−7)	23 (−5)	26 (−3)	32 (0)	38 (3)	45 (7)	45 (7)	47 (8)	43 (6)	32 (0)	27 (−3)	17 (−8)	17 (−8)
Source: http://www.weather.com/weather/wxclimatology/monthly/graph/USCA0608

== Demographics ==
Historical population
Census	Pop.	Note	%±
2010	1,238		—
2020	1,385		11.9%
U.S. Decennial Census; 2010

=== 2020 census ===
As of the 2020 census, Sheridan had a population of 1,385. The population density was 54.2 inhabitants per square mile (20.9/km^{2}).

The age distribution was 319 people (23.0%) under the age of 18, 117 people (8.4%) aged 18 to 24, 330 people (23.8%) aged 25 to 44, 366 people (26.4%) aged 45 to 64, and 253 people (18.3%) who were 65 years of age or older. The median age was 41.4 years. For every 100 females, there were 96.7 males, and for every 100 females age 18 and over, there were 100.8 males age 18 and over.

0.0% of residents lived in urban areas, while 100.0% lived in rural areas.

The whole population lived in households. There were 439 households, out of which 153 (34.9%) had children under the age of 18 living in them, 251 (57.2%) were married-couple households, 29 (6.6%) were cohabiting couple households, 78 (17.8%) had a female householder with no partner present, and 81 (18.5%) had a male householder with no partner present. 82 households (18.7%) were one person, and 38 (8.7%) were one person aged 65 or older. The average household size was 3.15. There were 324 families (73.8% of all households).

There were 466 housing units at an average density of 18.3 units per square mile (7.1 units/km^{2}), of which 439 (94.2%) were occupied. Of these, 353 (80.4%) were owner-occupied, and 86 (19.6%) were occupied by renters. Of all housing units, 5.8% were vacant; the homeowner vacancy rate was 0.6%, and the rental vacancy rate was 0.0%.

Racial composition as of the 2020 census
Race	Number	Percent
White	952	68.7%
Black or African American	13	0.9%
American Indian and Alaska Native	25	1.8%
Asian	13	0.9%
Native Hawaiian and Other Pacific Islander	2	0.1%
Some other race	161	11.6%
Two or more races	219	15.8%
Hispanic or Latino (of any race)	343	24.8%

=== 2010 census ===
Sheridan first appeared as a census designated place in the 2010 U.S. census.
