= North Auburn, California =

North Auburn
- census-designated place
- Interactive map of North Auburn
- Location in the United States
- Coordinates: 38°56′20″N 121°06′20″W
- Country: United States
- State: California
- County: Placer

Government
  - State Senate: Megan Dahle (R)
  - State Assembly: Joe Patterson (R)
  - U. S. Congress: Kevin Kiley (I)

Area
  - Total: 7.791 sq mi (20.179 km^{2})
  - Land: 7.788 sq mi (20.172 km^{2})
  - Water: 0.0027 sq mi (0.007 km^{2}) 0.04%
- Elevation: 1,467 ft (447 m)

Population (2020)
  - Total: 13,452
  - Density: 1,727/sq mi (666.9/km^{2})
- Time zone: UTC-8 (PST)
  - Summer (DST): UTC-7 (PDT)
- ZIP code: 95603
- Area code: 530
- FIPS code: 06-51637
- GNIS feature ID: 2408934

North Auburn is a census-designated place (CDP) in Placer County, California, United States. It is part of the Sacramento metropolitan area. The population was 13,452 at the 2020 census.

== Geography ==
According to the United States Census Bureau, the CDP has a total area of 7.8 square miles (20 km^{2}), 99.96% of it land and 0.04% of it water.

=== Climate ===
According to the Köppen Climate Classification system, North Auburn has a warm-summer Mediterranean climate, abbreviated "Csa" on climate maps.

== Demographics ==
Historical population
Census	Pop.	Note	%±
1970	2,089		—
1980	7,619		264.7%
1990	10,301		35.2%
2000	11,847		15.0%
2010	13,022		9.9%
2020	13,452		3.3%

=== 2020 census ===
As of the 2020 census, North Auburn had a population of 13,452 and a population density of 1,727.3 inhabitants per square mile (666.9/km^{2}). The age distribution was 19.0% under the age of 18, 6.5% aged 18 to 24, 23.2% aged 25 to 44, 23.8% aged 45 to 64, and 27.4% who were 65 years of age or older. The median age was 46.0 years. For every 100 females, there were 91.3 males, and for every 100 females age 18 and over there were 88.9 males age 18 and over.

The census reported that 94.4% of the population lived in households, 1.4% lived in non-institutionalized group quarters, and 4.2% were institutionalized. In addition, 97.1% of residents lived in urban areas, while 2.9% lived in rural areas.

There were 5,485 households, of which 23.6% had children under the age of 18 living in them. Of all households, 42.8% were married-couple households, 6.5% were cohabiting-couple households, 18.0% were households with a male householder and no spouse or partner present, and 32.6% were households with a female householder and no spouse or partner present. About 33.3% of all households were made up of individuals and 20.9% had someone living alone who was 65 years of age or older. The average household size was 2.32, and there were 3,276 families (59.7% of all households).

There were 5,766 housing units at an average density of 740.4 units per square mile (285.9 units/km^{2}), of which 4.9% were vacant. Of occupied units, 60.3% were owner-occupied and 39.7% were occupied by renters. The homeowner vacancy rate was 1.0% and the rental vacancy rate was 4.8%.

Racial composition as of the 2020 census
Race	Number	Percent
White	10,098	75.1%
Black or African American	123	0.9%
American Indian and Alaska Native	212	1.6%
Asian	310	2.3%
Native Hawaiian and Other Pacific Islander	25	0.2%
Some other race	1,197	8.9%
Two or more races	1,487	11.1%
Hispanic or Latino (of any race)	2,519	18.7%

=== Demographic estimates ===
In 2023, the US Census Bureau estimated that 14.5% of the population were foreign-born. Of all people aged 5 or older, 79.8% spoke only English at home, 17.8% spoke Spanish, 1.2% spoke other Indo-European languages, and 1.1% spoke Asian or Pacific Islander languages. Of those aged 25 or older, 90.4% were high school graduates and 26.3% had a bachelor's degree.

=== Income and poverty ===
The median household income in 2023 was $72,125, and the per capita income was $44,024. About 10.2% of families and 12.4% of the population were below the poverty line.

=== 2010 census ===
At the 2010 census North Auburn had a population of 13,022. The population density was 1,669.3 inhabitants per square mile (644.5/km^{2}). The racial makeup of North Auburn was 11,081 (85.1%) White, 115 (0.9%) African American, 172 (1.3%) Native American, 298 (2.3%) Asian, 13 (0.1%) Pacific Islander, 893 (6.9%) from other races, and 450 (3.5%) from two or more races. Hispanic or Latino of any race were 2,108 persons (16.2%).

The census reported that 11,999 people (92.1% of the population) lived in households, 308 (2.4%) lived in non-institutionalized group quarters, and 715 (5.5%) were institutionalized.

There were 5,080 households, 1,440 (28.3%) had children under the age of 18 living in them, 2,254 (44.4%) were opposite-sex married couples living together, 598 (11.8%) had a female householder with no husband present, 238 (4.7%) had a male householder with no wife present. There were 312 (6.1%) unmarried opposite-sex partnerships, and 24 (0.5%) same-sex married couples or partnerships. 1,657 households (32.6%) were one person and 978 (19.3%) had someone living alone who was 65 or older. The average household size was 2.36. There were 3,090 families (60.8% of households); the average family size was 2.97.

The age distribution was 2,732 people (21.0%) under the age of 18, 1,125 people (8.6%) aged 18 to 24, 2,988 people (22.9%) aged 25 to 44, 3,535 people (27.1%) aged 45 to 64, and 2,642 people (20.3%) who were 65 or older. The median age was 42.5 years. For every 100 females, there were 93.2 males. For every 100 females age 18 and over, there were 92.7 males.

There were 5,539 housing units at an average density of 710.0 per square mile, of the occupied units 3,092 (60.9%) were owner-occupied and 1,988 (39.1%) were rented. The homeowner vacancy rate was 2.9%; the rental vacancy rate was 10.1%. 6,869 people (52.7% of the population) lived in owner-occupied housing units and 5,130 people (39.4%) lived in rental housing units.
