= Meadow Vista, California =

Meadow Vista
- census-designated place
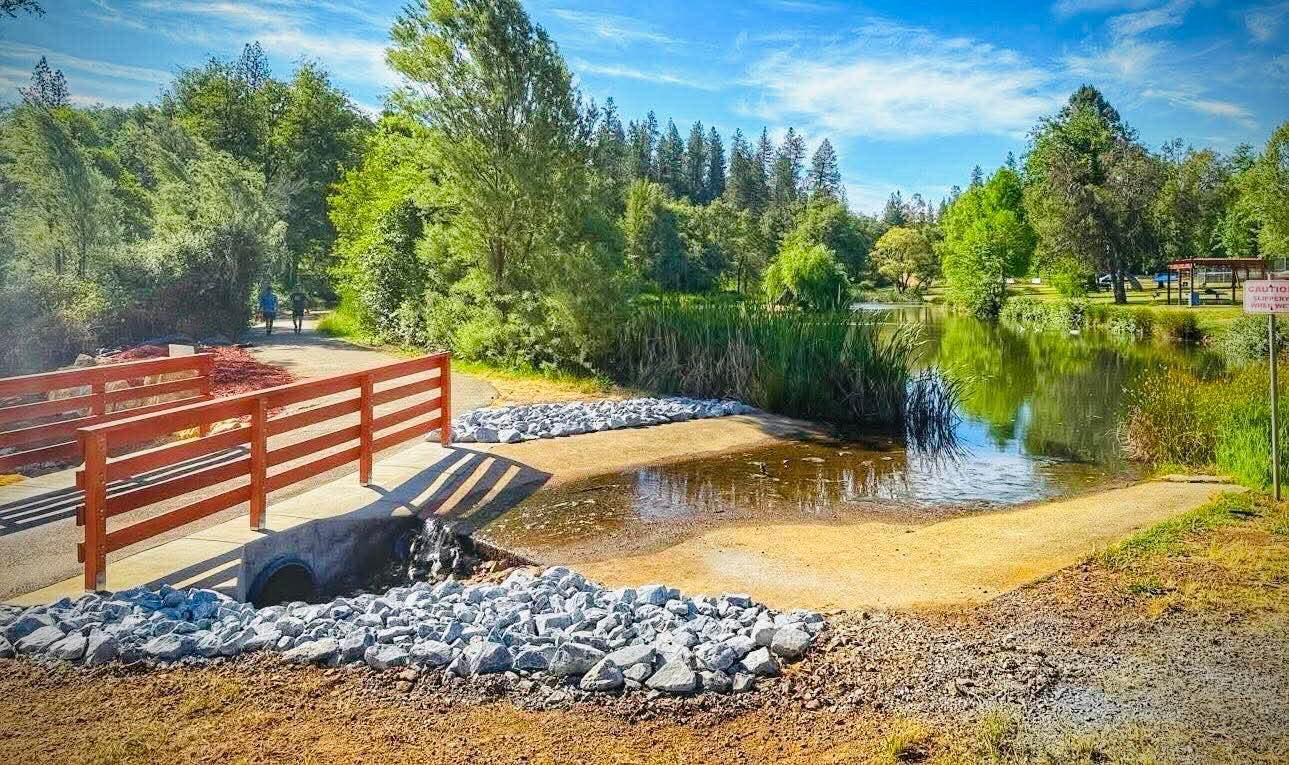
- A view of the walking trail and pond in Meadow Vista

- Location in Placer County and the state of California

- Location in the United States
- Coordinates: 39°00′11″N 121°01′15″W
- Country: United States
- State: California
- County: Placer

Government
  - State Senate: Megan Dahle (R)
  - State Assembly: Joe Patterson (R)
  - U. S. Congress: Kevin Kiley (I)

Area
  - Total: 5.437 sq mi (14.081 km^{2})
  - Land: 5.281 sq mi (13.678 km^{2})
  - Water: 0.155 sq mi (0.402 km^{2}) 2.86%
- Elevation: 1,683 ft (513 m)

Population (2020)
  - Total: 3,263
  - Density: 617.9/sq mi (238.6/km^{2})
- Time zone: UTC-8 (PST)
  - Summer (DST): UTC-7 (PDT)
- ZIP code: 95722
- Area codes: 530, 837
- FIPS code: 06-46632
- GNIS feature ID: 2408810

Meadow Vista is a census-designated place (CDP) in Placer County, California, United States. It is part of the Sacramento metropolitan area. The population was 3,263 at the 2020 census, up from 3,217 at the 2010 census.

== Geography ==
According to the United States Census Bureau, the CDP has a total area of 5.4 square miles (14 km^{2}), of which, 5.3 square miles (14 km^{2}) of it is land and 0.2 square miles (0.52 km^{2}) of it (2.86%) is water.

== Demographics ==
Historical population
Census	Pop.	Note	%±
1980	2,683		—
1990	3,067		14.3%
2000	3,096		0.9%
2010	3,217		3.9%
2020	3,263		1.4%
U.S. Decennial Census; 1860–1870 1880-1890; 1900 1910 1920; 1930 1940 1950; 1960 1970 1980; 1990 2000 2010

Meadow Vista first appeared as a census designated place in the 1980 United States census.

=== 2020 census ===
As of the 2020 census, Meadow Vista had a population of 3,263. The population density was 617.9 inhabitants per square mile (238.6/km^{2}). The median age was 51.7 years. 18.8% of residents were under the age of 18 and 26.7% were 65 years of age or older. For every 100 females, there were 92.4 males, and for every 100 females age 18 and over, there were 92.0 males age 18 and over.

The census reported that 3,242 people (99.4% of the population) lived in households, 21 people (0.6%) lived in non-institutionalized group quarters, and no one was institutionalized. There were 1,284 households, out of which 24.4% included children under the age of 18. Of all households, 62.8% were married-couple households, 14.6% were households with a male householder and no spouse or partner present, and 17.1% were households with a female householder and no spouse or partner present. 21.3% of households were one person, and 13.2% were one person aged 65 or older. The average household size was 2.52. There were 944 families (73.5% of all households).

There were 1,388 housing units at an average density of 262.8 units per square mile (101.5 units/km^{2}), of which 1,284 (92.5%) were occupied. Of the occupied units, 86.4% were owner-occupied and 13.6% were occupied by renters. 7.5% of housing units were vacant. The homeowner vacancy rate was 0.7% and the rental vacancy rate was 1.7%.

0.0% of residents lived in urban areas, while 100.0% lived in rural areas.

Racial composition as of the 2020 census
Race	Number	Percent
White	2,861	87.7%
Black or African American	3	0.1%
American Indian and Alaska Native	16	0.5%
Asian	24	0.7%
Native Hawaiian and Other Pacific Islander	2	0.1%
Some other race	83	2.5%
Two or more races	274	8.4%
Hispanic or Latino (of any race)	272	8.3%

=== Income and poverty ===
In 2023, the US Census Bureau estimated that the median household income was $95,998, and the per capita income was $53,801. About 0.0% of families and 3.8% of the population were below the poverty line.

=== 2010 census ===
At the 2010 census Meadow Vista had a population of 3,217. The population density was 591.7 inhabitants per square mile (228.5/km^{2}). The racial makeup of Meadow Vista was 3,017 (93.8%) White, 1 (0.0%) African American, 21 (0.7%) Native American, 35 (1.1%) Asian, 6 (0.2%) Pacific Islander, 34 (1.1%) from other races, and 103 (3.2%) from two or more races. Hispanic or Latino people of any race were 171 (5.3%).

The census reported that 3,201 people (99.5% of the population) lived in households, 16 (0.5%) lived in non-institutionalized group quarters, and no one was institutionalized.

There were 1,246 households, 374 (30.0%) had children under the age of 18 living in them, 807 (64.8%) were opposite-sex married couples living together, 96 (7.7%) had a female householder with no husband present, 51 (4.1%) had a male householder with no wife present. There were 48 (3.9%) unmarried opposite-sex partnerships, and 7 (0.6%) same-sex married couples or partnerships. 233 households (18.7%) were one person and 118 (9.5%) had someone living alone who was 65 or older. The average household size was 2.57. There were 954 families (76.6% of households); the average family size was 2.90.

The age distribution was 660 people (20.5%) under the age of 18, 219 people (6.8%) aged 18 to 24, 525 people (16.3%) aged 25 to 44, 1,205 people (37.5%) aged 45 to 64, and 608 people (18.9%) who were 65 or older. The median age was 48.3 years. For every 100 females, there were 101.2 males. For every 100 females age 18 and over, there were 97.9 males.

There were 1,339 housing units at an average density of 246.3 per square mile, of the occupied units 1,048 (84.1%) were owner-occupied and 198 (15.9%) were rented. The homeowner vacancy rate was 1.5%; the rental vacancy rate was 6.6%. 2,704 people (84.1% of the population) lived in owner-occupied housing units and 497 people (15.4%) lived in rental housing units.

== Annual community events ==
- Easter Egg Hunt
- Mother's Day Breakfast
- Pioneer Day (first Sunday in June)
- Oktoberfest
- Christmas in the Village
