= Tahoe Vista, California =

Tahoe Vista
- census-designated place
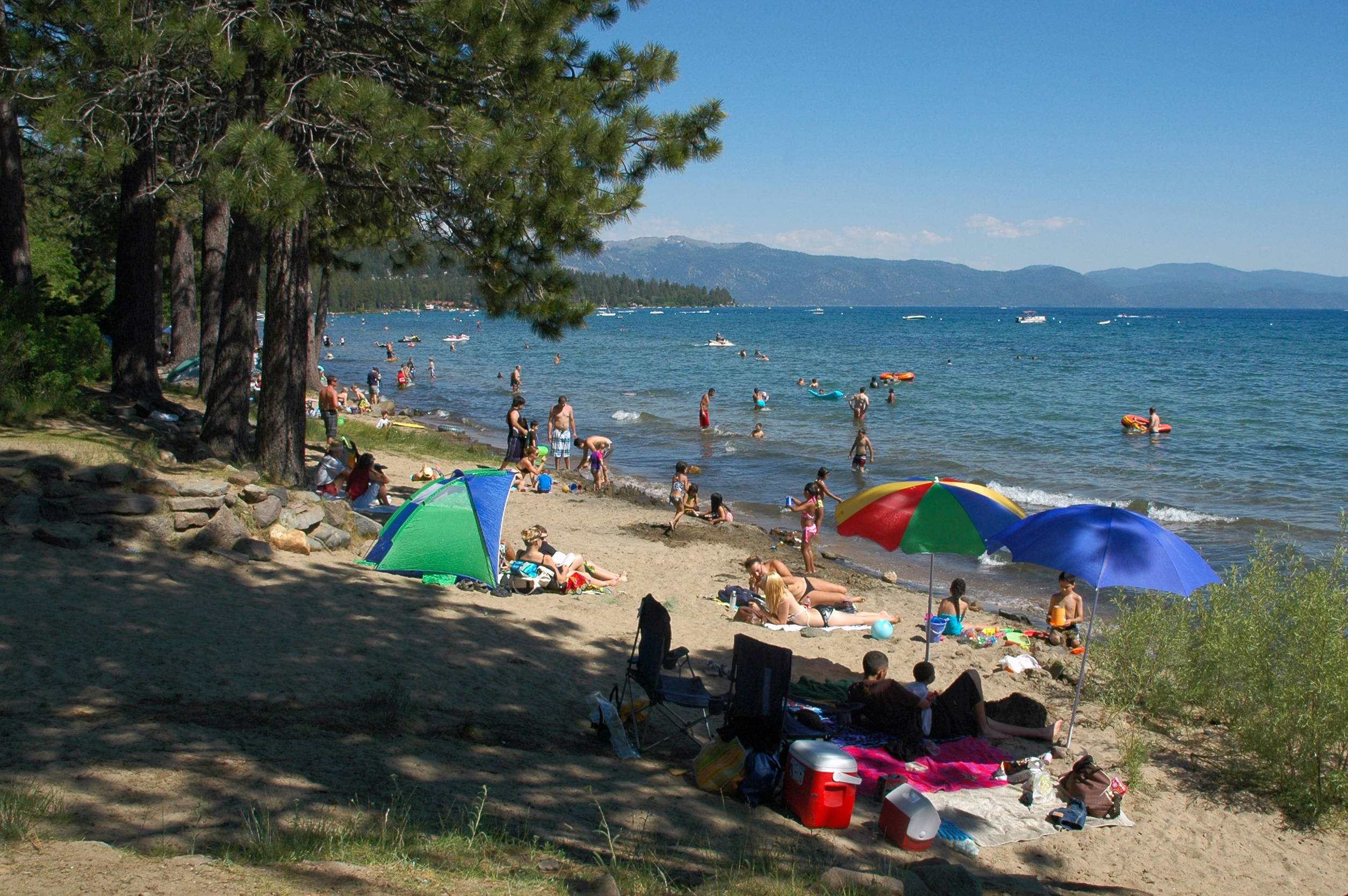
- North Tahoe Beach in Tahoe Vista, 2011

- Location in Placer County and the state of California

- Location in the United States
- Coordinates: 39°15′02″N 120°03′22″W
- Country: United States
- State: California
- County: Placer

Government
  - State Senate: Marie Alvarado-Gil (R)
  - State Assembly: Heather Hadwick (R)
  - U. S. Congress: Kevin Kiley (I)

Area
  - Total: 2.854 sq mi (7.393 km^{2})
  - Land: 2.716 sq mi (7.034 km^{2})
  - Water: 0.139 sq mi (0.360 km^{2}) 4.87%
- Elevation: 6,414 ft (1,955 m)

Population (2020)
  - Total: 1,392
  - Density: 512.5/sq mi (197.9/km^{2})
- Time zone: UTC-8 (PST)
  - Summer (DST): UTC-7 (PDT)
- ZIP code: 96148
- Area codes: 530, 837
- FIPS code: 06-77700
- GNIS feature ID: 2410050

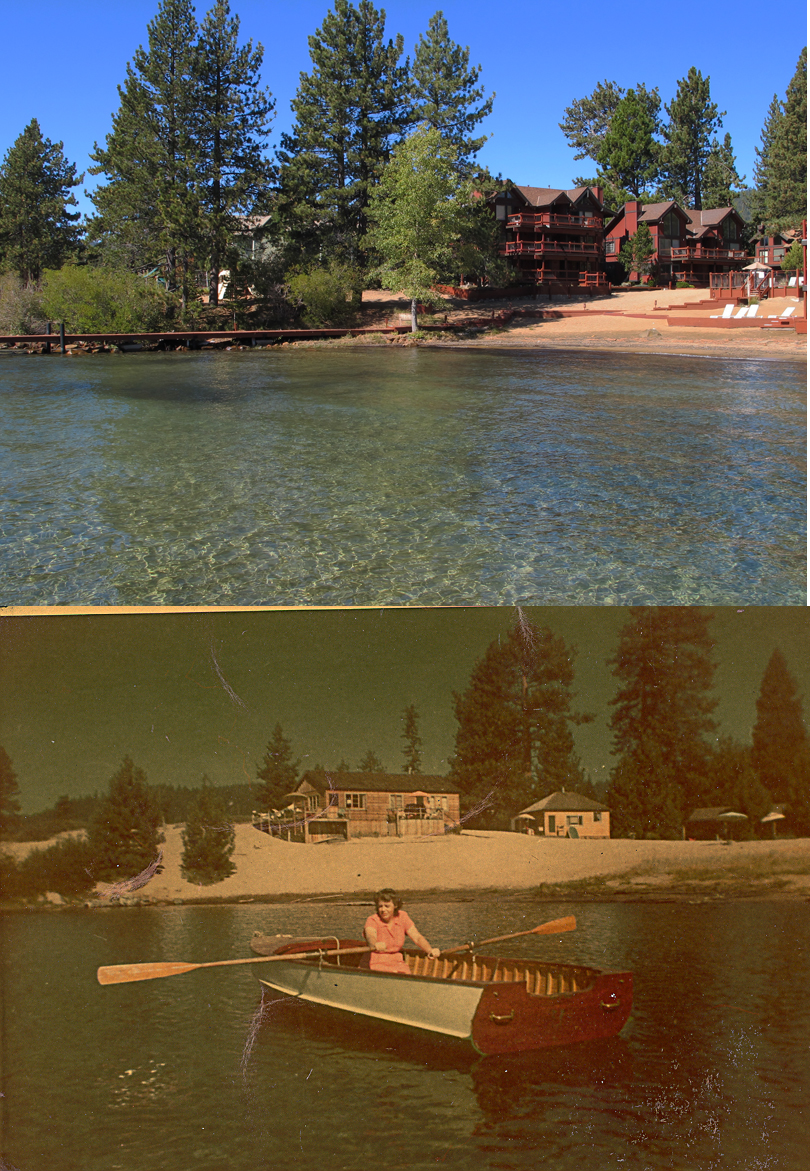
Edgelake Beach Club in Tahoe Vista, 1946 & 2011

Tahoe Vista is a census-designated place located on the north shore of Lake Tahoe in Placer County, California. It is part of the Sacramento metropolitan area. The population was 1,392 at the 2020 census, down from 1,433 at the 2010 census.

== Geography ==
According to the United States Census Bureau, the CDP has a land area of 2.7 square miles (7.0 km^{2}).

== Demographics ==
=== 2020 census ===
As of the 2020 census, Tahoe Vista had a population of 1,392 and a population density of 512.5 inhabitants per square mile (197.9/km^{2}). The median age was 40.8 years. The age distribution was 21.1% under the age of 18, 4.4% aged 18 to 24, 29.5% aged 25 to 44, 29.2% aged 45 to 64, and 15.9% who were 65 years of age or older. For every 100 females, there were 105.3 males, and for every 100 females age 18 and over, there were 106.0 males age 18 and over.

100.0% of residents lived in urban areas, while 0.0% lived in rural areas.

Racial composition as of the 2020 census
Race	Number	Percent
White	944	67.8%
Black or African American	4	0.3%
American Indian and Alaska Native	9	0.6%
Asian	16	1.1%
Native Hawaiian and Other Pacific Islander	0	0.0%
Some other race	309	22.2%
Two or more races	110	7.9%
Hispanic or Latino (of any race)	414	29.7%

There were 596 households, out of which 23.8% included children under the age of 18. Of all households, 45.6% were married-couple households, 7.9% were cohabiting couple households, 21.3% had a female householder with no spouse or partner present, and 25.2% had a male householder with no spouse or partner present. About 27.8% of households were one person, and 9.9% were one person aged 65 or older. The average household size was 2.34. There were 369 families (61.9% of all households).

There were 1,530 housing units at an average density of 563.3 units per square mile (217.5 units/km^{2}). Of these, 596 (39.0%) were occupied and 61.0% were vacant. Of occupied units, 64.6% were owner-occupied and 35.4% were occupied by renters. The homeowner vacancy rate was 1.5% and the rental vacancy rate was 17.9%.

=== 2023 estimates ===
In 2023, the US Census Bureau estimated that the median household income was $98,264, and the per capita income was $57,771. About 8.1% of families and 11.4% of the population were below the poverty line.

== Education ==
It is in the Tahoe-Truckee Unified School District.
