= Carnelian Bay, California =

- census-designated place
- Location of Carnelian Bay in Placer County, California.

- Location within the United States
- Coordinates: 39°13′58″N 120°04′54″W
- Country: United States
- State: California
- County: Placer

Area
  - Total: 1.50 sq mi (3.88 km^{2})
  - Land: 1.30 sq mi (3.36 km^{2})
  - Water: 0.20 sq mi (0.52 km^{2}) 13.3%
- Elevation: 6,325 ft (1,928 m)

Population (2020)
  - Total: 518
  - Density: 398.8/sq mi (153.98/km^{2})
- Time zone: UTC-8 (Pacific (PST))
  - Summer (DST): UTC-7 (PDT)
- ZIP Code: 96140
- Area codes: 530, 837
- GNIS feature ID: 2628716

Carnelian Bay (formerly, Cornelian Bay) is an unincorporated community on the shore of Lake Tahoe in Placer County, California, United States. The Cornelian Bay post office operated from 1883 to 1887 and from 1891 to 1893. The Carnelian Bay post office opened in 1908.

For statistical purposes, the United States Census Bureau has defined Carnelian Bay as a census-designated place (CDP). The census definition of the area may not precisely correspond to local understanding of the area with the same name. The population was 518 at the 2020 census. The elevation is 6,325 feet (1,928 m).

Nearby cities and towns include: Tahoe Vista, Brockway, Kings Beach, Crystal Bay, Incline Village, Truckee, Tahoma, Homewood, and Tahoe City. Its ZIP code is 96140 and its area code 530.

== Geography ==
According to the United States Census Bureau, the CDP covers an area of 1.5 square miles (3.9 km^{2}), 86.7% of it land, and 13.3% of it water.

== Demographics ==
Historical population
Census	Pop.	Note	%±
2010	524		—
2020	518		−1.1%
U.S. Decennial Census; 1850–1870 1880-1890; 1900 1910 1920; 1930 1940 1950; 1960 1970 1980; 1990 2000 2010

Carnelian Bay first appeared as a census designated place in the 2010 U.S. census.

=== 2020 census ===
As of the 2020 census, Carnelian Bay had a population of 518. The population density was 398.8 inhabitants per square mile (154.0/km^{2}). The median age was 46.5 years. The age distribution was 83 people (16.0%) under the age of 18, 14 people (2.7%) aged 18 to 24, 155 people (29.9%) aged 25 to 44, 146 people (28.2%) aged 45 to 64, and 120 people (23.2%) who were 65 years of age or older. For every 100 females, there were 109.7 males; for every 100 females age 18 and over, there were 103.3 males age 18 and over. 95.0% of residents lived in urban areas, while 5.0% lived in rural areas.

The whole population lived in households. There were 246 households, out of which 46 (18.7%) had children under the age of 18 living in them, 99 (40.2%) were married-couple households, 22 (8.9%) were cohabiting couple households, 67 (27.2%) had a female householder with no partner present, and 58 (23.6%) had a male householder with no partner present. 78 households (31.7%) were one person, and 21 (8.5%) were one person aged 65 or older. The average household size was 2.11. There were 135 families (54.9% of all households).

There were 919 housing units at an average density of 707.5 units per square mile (273.2 units/km^{2}), of which 246 (26.8%) were occupied. Of these, 176 (71.5%) were owner-occupied, and 70 (28.5%) were occupied by renters. The homeowner vacancy rate was 0.0% and the rental vacancy rate was 40.8%.

Racial composition as of the 2020 census
Race	Number	Percent
White	469	90.5%
Black or African American	3	0.6%
American Indian and Alaska Native	1	0.2%
Asian	4	0.8%
Native Hawaiian and Other Pacific Islander	1	0.2%
Some other race	5	1.0%
Two or more races	35	6.8%
Hispanic or Latino (of any race)	31	6.0%

== Education ==
It is in the Tahoe-Truckee Unified School District.
