= Sunnyside–Tahoe City, California =

Sunnyside–Tahoe City
- census-designated place
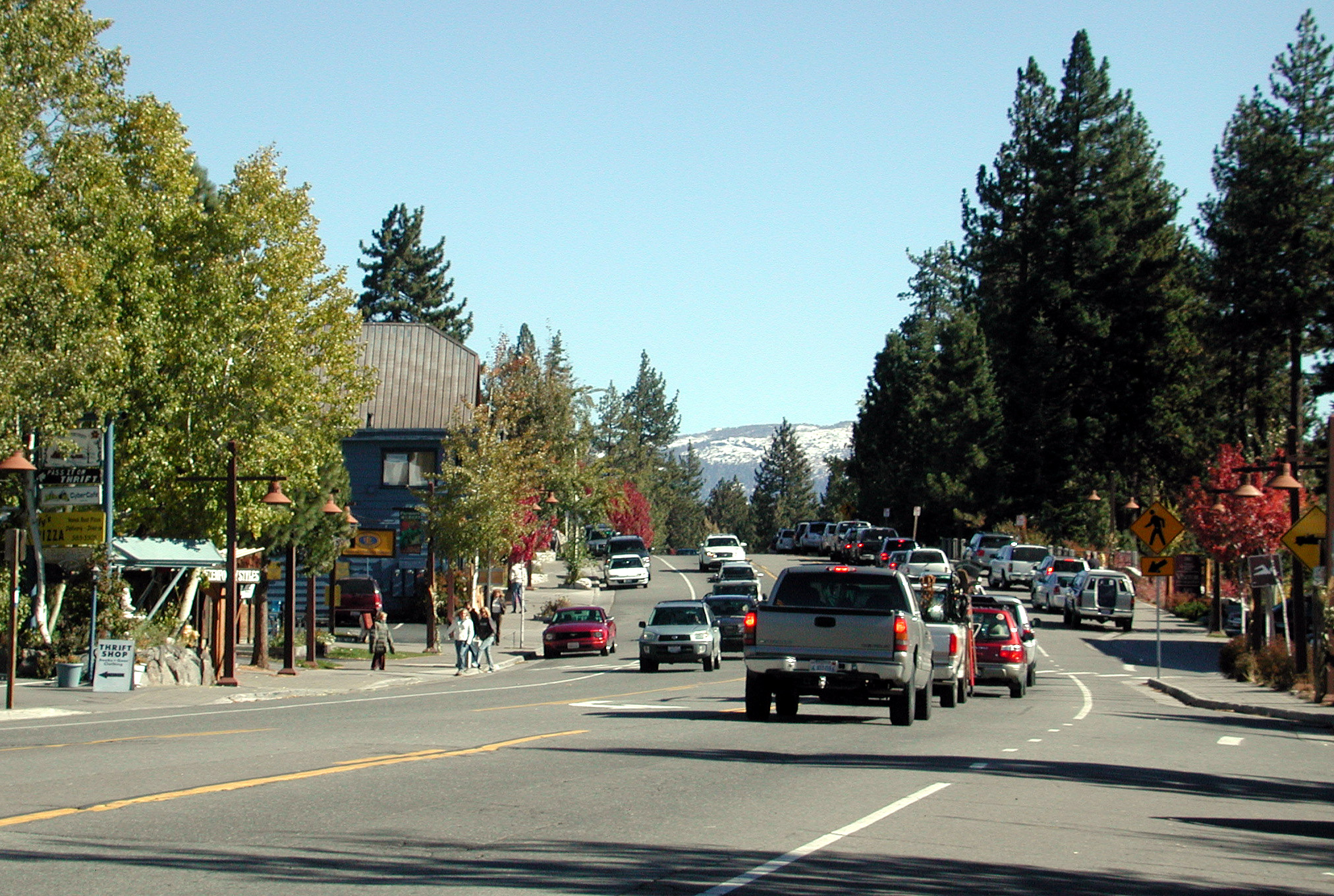
- North Lake Boulevard

- Location in Placer County and the state of California

- Location in the United States
- Coordinates: 39°09′02″N 120°09′35″W
- Country: United States
- State: California
- County: Placer

Government
  - State Senate: Marie Alvarado-Gil (R)
  - State Assembly: Heather Hadwick (R)
  - U. S. Congress: Kevin Kiley (I)

Area
  - Total: 3.812 sq mi (9.873 km^{2})
  - Land: 3.481 sq mi (9.016 km^{2})
  - Water: 0.331 sq mi (0.857 km^{2}) 8.68%
- Elevation: 6,752 ft (2,058 m)

Population (2020)
  - Total: 1,555
  - Density: 446.7/sq mi (172.5/km^{2})
- Time zone: UTC-8 (PST)
  - Summer (DST): UTC-7 (PDT)
- ZIP code: 96145
- Area codes: 530, 837
- FIPS code: 06-76015
- GNIS feature ID: 2410030

Sunnyside–Tahoe City is a census-designated place (CDP) in Placer County, California, located on the northwest shore of Lake Tahoe. The population was 1,555 at the 2020 census, down from 1,557 at the 2010 census, and its land area is 3.5 mi^{2} (9.1 km^{2}). It includes the two communities, Sunnyside, and Tahoe City.

== Demographics ==
Historical population
Census	Pop.	Note	%±
1970	1,394		—
1980	1,836		31.7%
1990	1,643		−10.5%
2000	1,761		7.2%
2010	1,557		−11.6%
2020	1,555		−0.1%
U.S. Decennial Census; 1860–1870 1880-1890; 1900 1910 1920; 1930 1940 1950; 1960 1970 1980; 1990 2000 2010

=== 2020 ===
The 2020 United States census reported that Sunnyside-Tahoe City had a population of 1,555. The population density was 446.7 inhabitants per square mile (172.5/km^{2}). The racial makeup of the CDP was 1,365 (87.8%) White, 1 (0.1%) African American, 5 (0.3%) Native American, 21 (1.4%) Asian, 1 (0.1%) Pacific Islander, 54 (3.5%) from other races, and 108 (6.9%) from two or more races. Hispanic or Latino of any race were 115 persons (7.4%).

The whole population lived in households. There were 725 households, out of which 135 (18.6%) had children under the age of 18 living in them, 305 (42.1%) were married-couple households, 69 (9.5%) were cohabiting couple households, 132 (18.2%) had a female householder with no partner present, and 219 (30.2%) had a male householder with no partner present. 245 households (33.8%) were one person, and 67 (9.2%) were one person aged 65 or older. The average household size was 2.14. There were 398 families (54.9% of all households).

The age distribution was 235 people (15.1%) under the age of 18, 71 people (4.6%) aged 18 to 24, 471 people (30.3%) aged 25 to 44, 480 people (30.9%) aged 45 to 64, and 298 people (19.2%) who were 65 years of age or older. The median age was 45.0 years. For every 100 females, there were 112.1 males.

There were 2,354 housing units at an average density of 676.2 units per square mile (261.1 units/km^{2}), of which 725 (30.8%) were occupied. Of these, 433 (59.7%) were owner-occupied, and 292 (40.3%) were occupied by renters.

In 2023, the US Census Bureau estimated that the median household income was $121,154, and the per capita income was $76,225. About 0.0% of families and 0.8% of the population were below the poverty line.

=== 2010 ===
The 2010 United States census reported that Sunnyside–Tahoe City had a population of 1,557. The population density was 460.6 inhabitants per square mile (177.8/km^{2}). The racial makeup of Sunnyside–Tahoe City was 1,480 (95.1%) White, 3 (0.2%) African American, 4 (0.3%) Native American, 15 (1.0%) Asian, 1 (0.1%) Pacific Islander, 32 (2.1%) from other races, and 22 (1.4%) from two or more races. Hispanic or Latino of any race were 84 persons (5.4%).

The Census reported that 1,550 people (99.6% of the population) lived in households, 7 (0.4%) lived in non-institutionalized group quarters, and 0 (0%) were institutionalized.

There were 744 households, out of which 120 (16.1%) had children under the age of 18 living in them, 268 (36.0%) were opposite-sex married couples living together, 29 (3.9%) had a female householder with no husband present, 24 (3.2%) had a male householder with no wife present. There were 84 (11.3%) unmarried opposite-sex partnerships, and 5 (0.7%) same-sex married couples or partnerships. 255 households (34.3%) were made up of individuals, and 40 (5.4%) had someone living alone who was 65 years of age or older. The average household size was 2.08. There were 321 families (43.1% of all households); the average family size was 2.64.

The population was spread out, with 191 people (12.3%) under the age of 18, 140 people (9.0%) aged 18 to 24, 549 people (35.3%) aged 25 to 44, 513 people (32.9%) aged 45 to 64, and 164 people (10.5%) who were 65 years of age or older. The median age was 40.7 years. For every 100 females there were 120.5 males. For every 100 females age 18 and over, there were 125.8 males.

There were 2,119 housing units at an average density of 626.9 per square mile (242.0/km^{2}), of which 402 (54.0%) were owner-occupied, and 342 (46.0%) were occupied by renters. The homeowner vacancy rate was 4.3%; the rental vacancy rate was 21.2%. 849 people (54.5% of the population) lived in owner-occupied housing units and 701 people (45.0%) lived in rental housing units.

== Climate ==
Sunnyside-Lake Tahoe has a warm-summer Mediterranean climate (Csb) according to the Köppen climate classification system.

Climate data for Tahoe City (1903-2015)
Month	Jan	Feb	Mar	Apr	May	Jun	Jul	Aug	Sep	Oct	Nov	Dec	Year
Mean daily maximum °F (°C)	38.6 (3.7)	40.3 (4.6)	44.0 (6.7)	50.4 (10.2)	59.6 (15.3)	68.7 (20.4)	77.9 (25.5)	77.2 (25.1)	69.8 (21.0)	58.8 (14.9)	46.9 (8.3)	40.3 (4.6)	56.0 (13.3)
Mean daily minimum °F (°C)	19.1 (−7.2)	19.9 (−6.7)	22.8 (−5.1)	26.9 (−2.8)	32.8 (0.4)	38.6 (3.7)	44.4 (6.9)	43.7 (6.5)	39.0 (3.9)	32.3 (0.2)	25.8 (−3.4)	20.8 (−6.2)	30.5 (−0.8)
Average precipitation inches (mm)	5.97 (152)	5.29 (134)	4.12 (105)	2.14 (54)	1.20 (30)	0.65 (17)	0.26 (6.6)	0.30 (7.6)	0.59 (15)	1.82 (46)	3.57 (91)	5.55 (141)	31.46 (799)
Average snowfall inches (cm)	45.9 (117)	36.5 (93)	35.2 (89)	15.9 (40)	3.7 (9.4)	0.2 (0.51)	0 (0)	0 (0)	0.3 (0.76)	2.4 (6.1)	15.5 (39)	35.2 (89)	190.7 (484)
Source: WRCC

== Education ==
It is in the Tahoe-Truckee Unified School District.

== See also ==
Tahoe City, California (unincorporated community)
