= Placer County, California =

County in California, United States

Placer County
- County
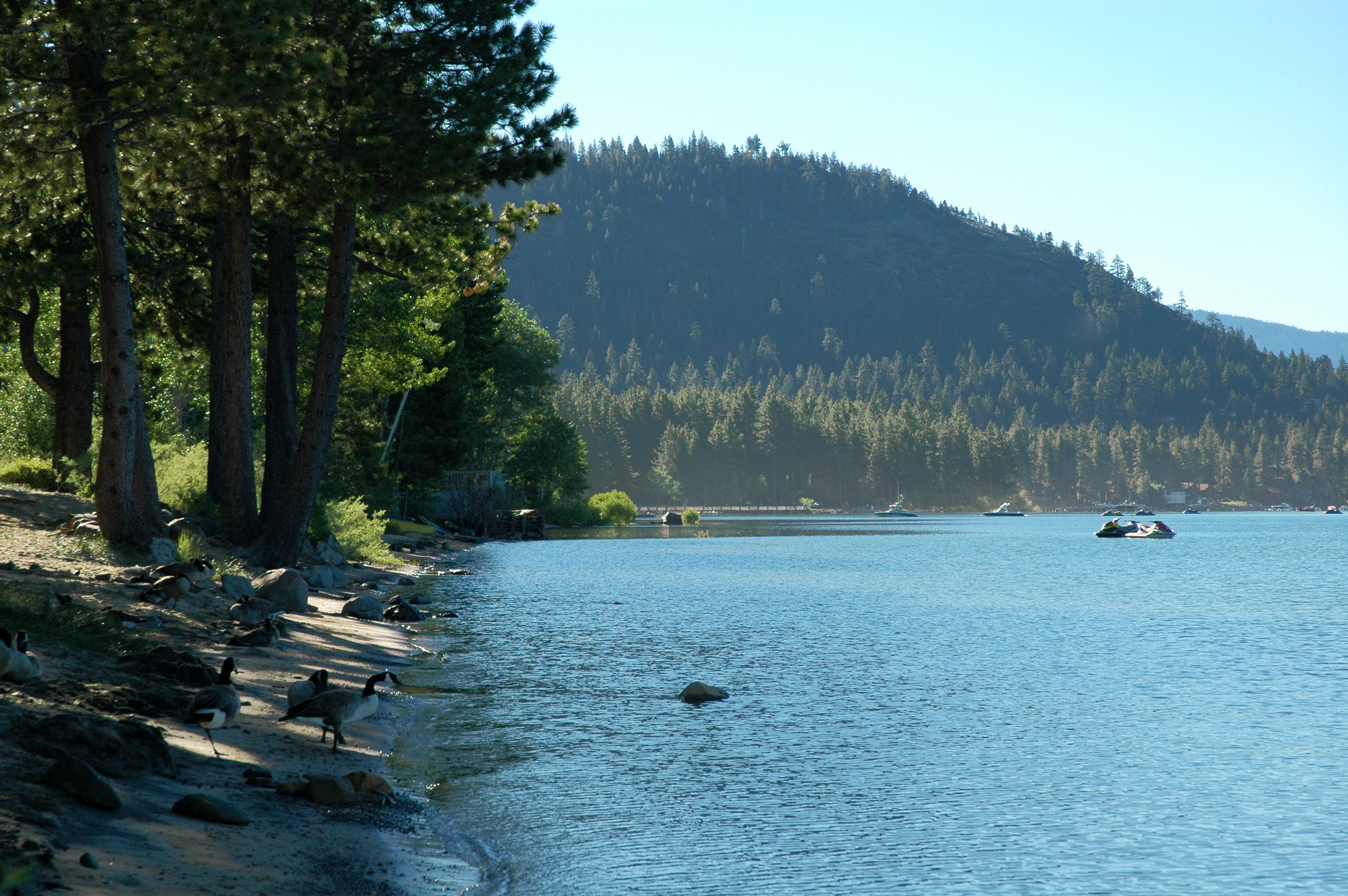
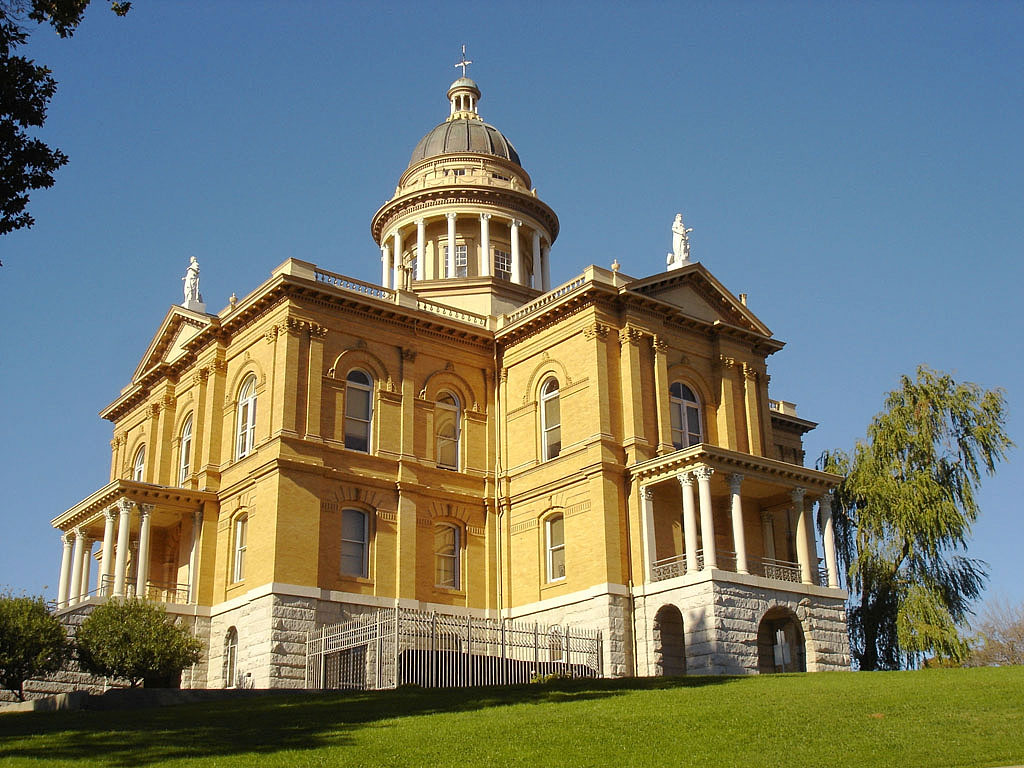
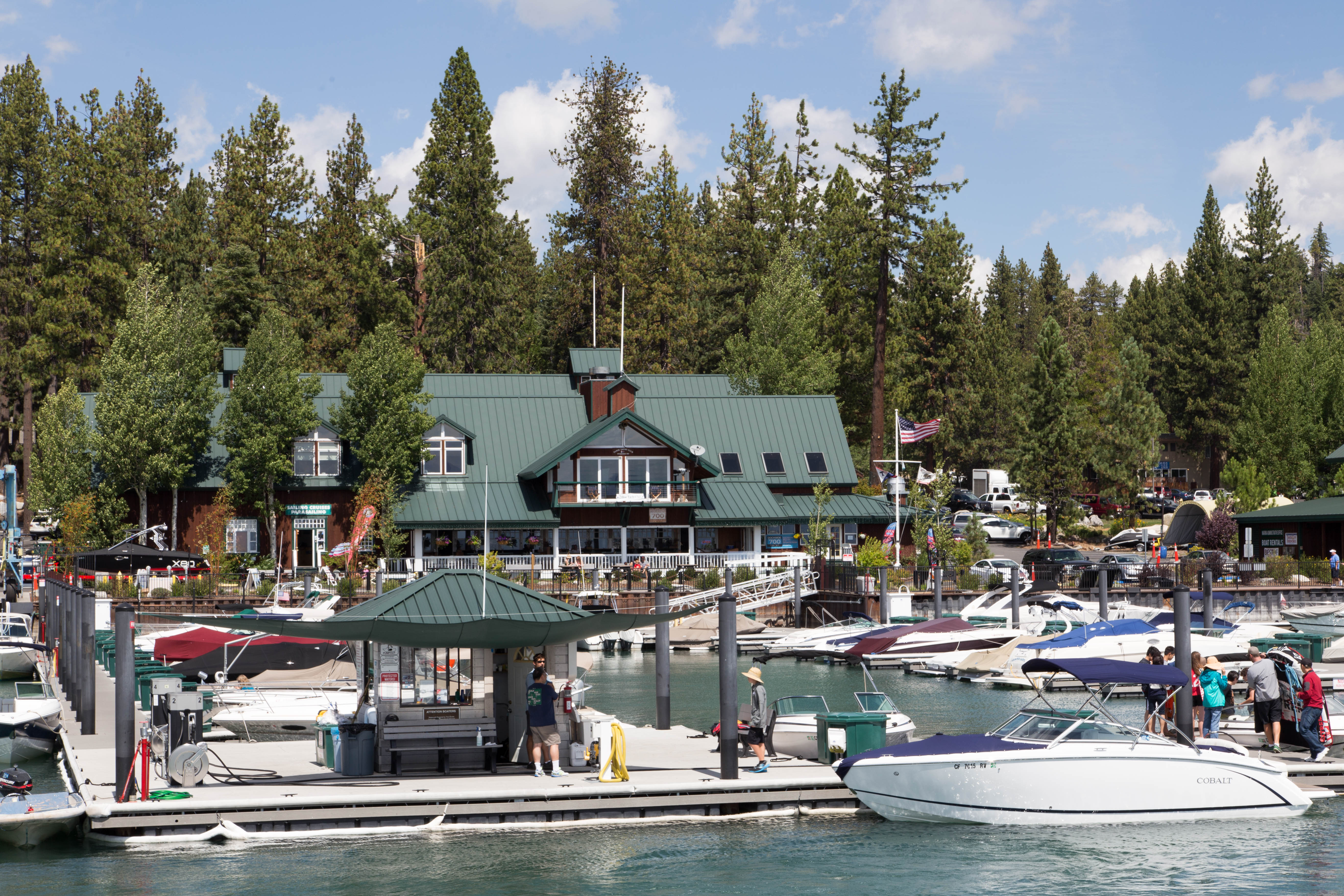
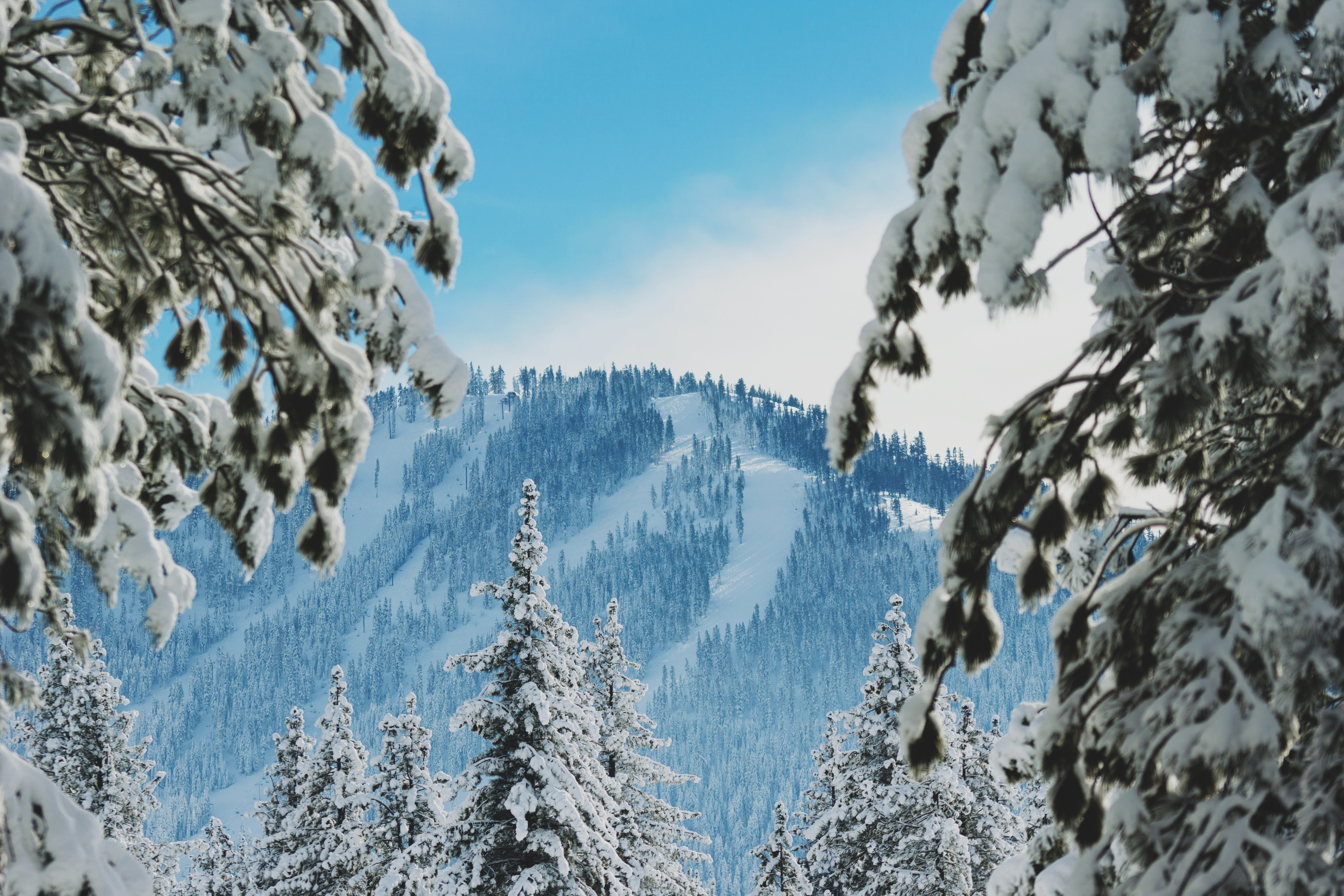
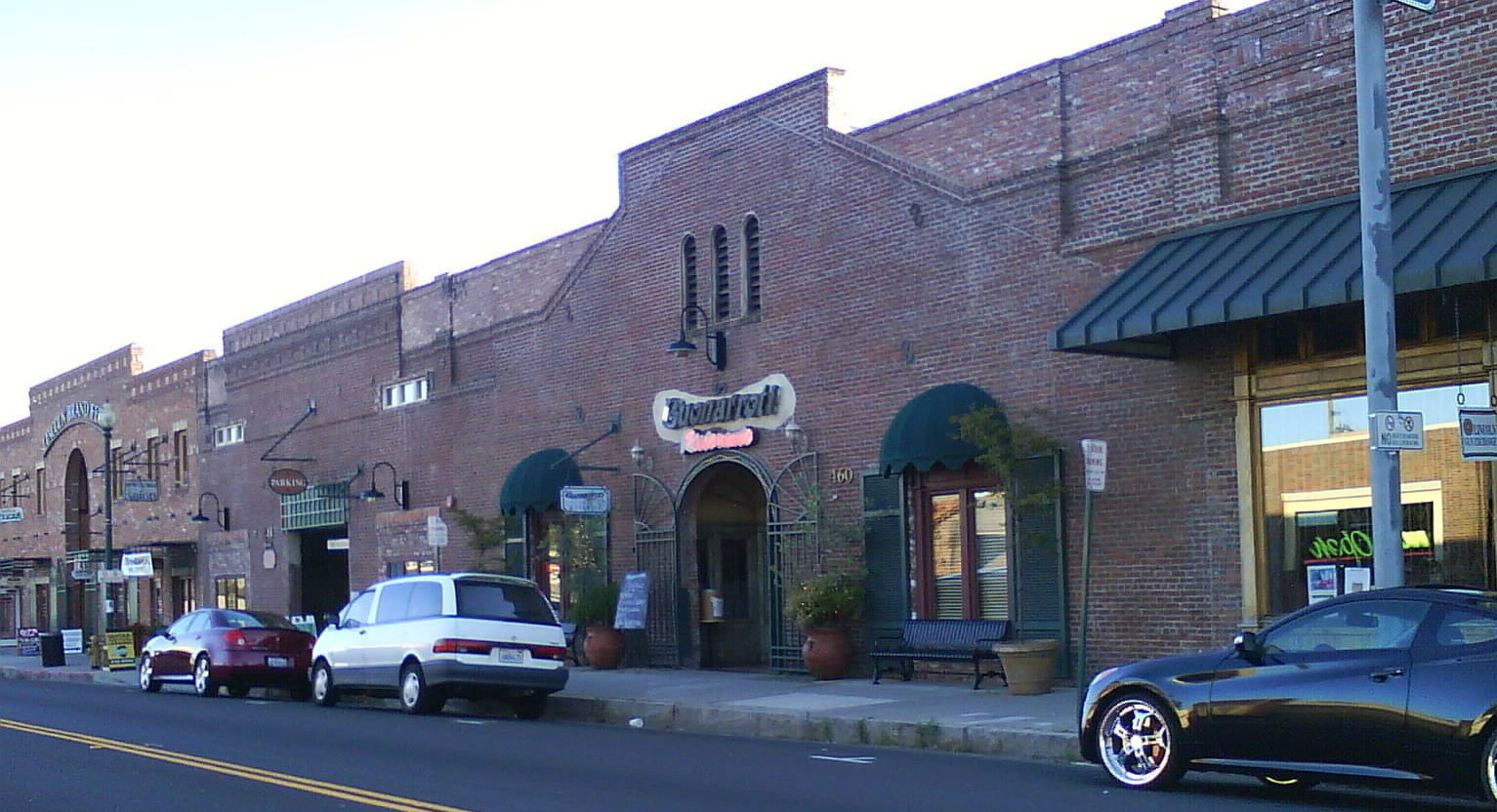
- Lake Tahoe Auburn Tahoe City Mount Pluto Lincoln

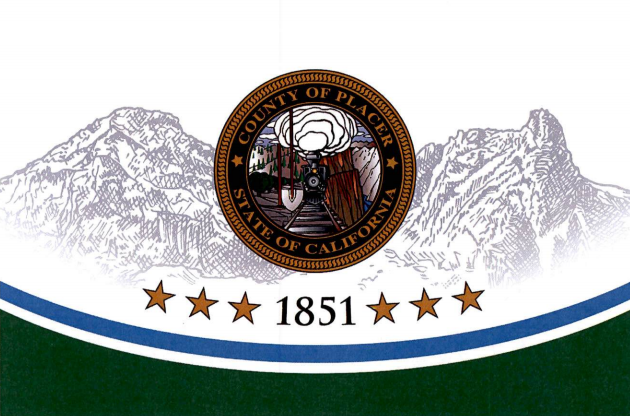
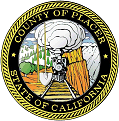
- Flag Seal
- Interactive map of Placer County
- Location in the state of California
- Coordinates: 39.06°N 120.73°W
- Country: United States
- State: California
- Regions: Sacramento Valley, Sierra Nevada
- Metro area: Greater Sacramento
- Incorporated: April 25, 1851
- Named for: Placer mining, a reference to the area being a center of the California Gold Rush
- County seat: Auburn
- Largest city: Roseville

Government
  - Type: Council–CEO
  - Body: Board of Supervisors: Bonnie Gore; Shanti Landon; Anthony M. DeMattei; Suzanne Jones; Cindy Gustafson
  - Chair: Shanti Landon
  - Vice Chair: Cindy Gustafson
  - County Executive Officer: Daniel J. Chatigny

Area
  - Total: 1,502 sq mi (3,890 km^{2})
  - Land: 1,407 sq mi (3,640 km^{2})
  - Water: 95 sq mi (250 km^{2})
- Highest elevation: 9,044 ft (2,757 m)

Population (2020)
  - Total: 404,739
  - Estimate (2025): 442,081 ▲
  - Density: 287.7/sq mi (111.1/km^{2})
- Time zone: UTC−8 (Pacific Time Zone)
  - Summer (DST): UTC−7 (Pacific Daylight Time)
- Area codes: 530, 916, 279
- FIPS code: 06-061
- GNIS feature ID: 277295
- Congressional district: 3rd
- Website: www.placer.ca.gov

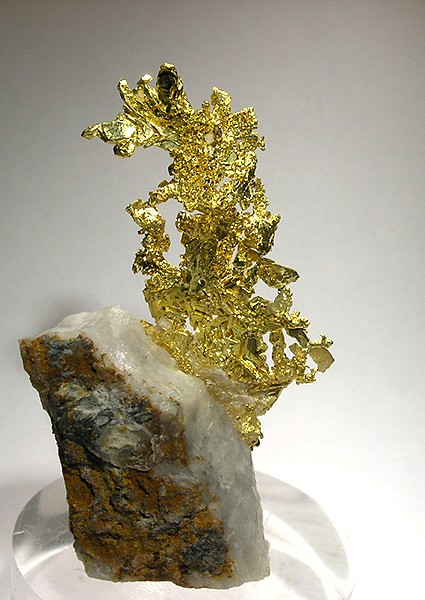
Gold specimen from the Eagle's Nest Mine, a source of specimen gold in Placer County

Placer County (/ˈplæsər/ PLASS-ər), officially the County of Placer, is located in the U.S. state of California. As of the 2020 United States census, the population was 404,739. The county seat is Auburn.

Placer County is included in the Greater Sacramento metropolitan area. It is in both the Sacramento Valley and Sierra Nevada regions, in what is known as the Gold Country. The county stretches roughly 65 miles (105 km) from Sacramento's suburbs at Roseville to the Nevada border and the shore of Lake Tahoe.

== Etymology ==
The discovery of gold in 1848 brought tens of thousands of miners from around the world during the California Gold Rush. In addition, many more thousands came to provide goods and services to the miners. On April 25, 1851, the fast-growing county was formed from parts of Sutter and Yuba counties with Auburn as the county seat. Placer County took its name from the Spanish word for sand or gravel deposits containing gold. Miners washed away the gravel, leaving the heavier gold, in a process known as "placer mining".

== History ==
Gold mining was a major industry through the 1880s, but gradually the new residents turned to farming the fertile foothill soil, harvesting timber and working for the Southern Pacific Railroad. Auburn was settled when Claude Chana discovered gold in Auburn Ravine in May 1848, and it later became a shipping and supply center for the surrounding gold camps. The cornerstone of Placer's courthouse, which is clearly visible from Interstate 80 through Auburn, was laid on July 4, 1894. The building was renovated during the late 1980s and continues to serve the public with courtrooms, a sheriff's office and the Placer County Museum. Roseville, once a small agricultural center, became a major railroad center and grew to become the county's most populous city after the Southern Pacific Railroad moved its railroad switching yards there in 1908.

Loomis and Newcastle began as mining towns, but soon became centers of a booming fruit-growing industry, supporting many local packing houses. Penryn was founded by a Welsh miner, Griffith Griffith, who established a large granite quarry. Rocklin began as a railroad town and became home to a number of granite quarries. Lincoln and Sheridan continue to support ranching and farming. Lincoln also is the home of one of the county's oldest businesses, the Gladding, McBean terra cotta clay manufacturing plant, established in 1875.

The 1960 Winter Olympics were hosted in Olympic Valley, in Placer County.

== Geography ==
According to the U.S. Census Bureau, the county has an area of 1,502 square miles (3,890 km^{2}), of which 1,407 square miles (3,640 km^{2}) is land and 95 square miles (250 km^{2}) (6.4%) is water. Watercourses in Placer County include the American River and Bunch Creek. 40.96% of Lake Tahoe's surface area is in Placer County, more than in any of the four other counties in which it lies.

The county is typically divided into three regions; "South Placer" in the Central Valley and the Sierra Nevada foothills south of Auburn, "Gold Country" which consists of the Sierra Foothills around Auburn, Colfax, and Foresthill, and the Sierra Nevada which consists of all areas east of Foresthill and northeast of Colfax (including the Lake Tahoe region). Roughly 3/4ths of the population lives in South Placer, Roseville being the primary job and retail center of the county. Auburn and Lincoln are the main secondary commercial centers.

=== Adjacent counties ===
- Nevada County - north
- Washoe County, Nevada - northeast
- Carson City, Nevada - east
- Douglas County, Nevada - southeast
- El Dorado County - south
- Sacramento County - southwest
- Sutter County - west
- Yuba County - northwest

=== National protected areas ===
- Eldorado National Forest in part
- Tahoe National Forest in part

== Demographics ==
Historical population
Census	Pop.	Note	%±
1860	13,270		—
1870	11,357		−14.4%
1880	14,232		25.3%
1890	15,101		6.1%
1900	15,786		4.5%
1910	18,237		15.5%
1920	18,584		1.9%
1930	24,468		31.7%
1940	28,108		14.9%
1950	41,649		48.2%
1960	56,998		36.9%
1970	77,306		35.6%
1980	117,247		51.7%
1990	172,796		47.4%
2000	248,399		43.8%
2010	348,432		40.3%
2020	404,739		16.2%
2026 (est.)	449,883	▲	11.2%
U.S. Decennial Census; 1790–1960 1900–1990; 1990–2000 2010 2020

=== 2020 census ===
As of the 2020 census, the county had a population of 404,739. The median age was 42.4 years; 22.6% of residents were under the age of 18 and 20.5% were 65 years of age or older. For every 100 females there were 94.8 males, and for every 100 females age 18 and over there were 92.0 males age 18 and over.

The racial makeup of the county was 71.3% White, 1.7% Black or African American, 0.9% American Indian and Alaska Native, 8.8% Asian, 0.3% Native Hawaiian and Pacific Islander, 5.0% from some other race, and 12.1% from two or more races. Hispanic or Latino residents of any race comprised 15.0% of the population.

85.4% of residents lived in urban areas, while 14.6% lived in rural areas.

There were 152,101 households in the county, of which 32.3% had children under the age of 18 living with them and 23.5% had a female householder with no spouse or partner present. About 23.0% of all households were made up of individuals and 12.3% had someone living alone who was 65 years of age or older.

There were 172,356 housing units, of which 11.8% were vacant. Among occupied housing units, 71.7% were owner-occupied and 28.3% were renter-occupied. The homeowner vacancy rate was 1.0% and the rental vacancy rate was 4.9%.

=== Racial and ethnic composition ===
Placer County, California – Racial and ethnic composition Note: the US Census treats Hispanic/Latino as an ethnic category. This table excludes Latinos from the racial categories and assigns them to a separate category. Hispanics/Latinos may be of any race.
Race / Ethnicity (NH = Non-Hispanic)	Pop 1980	Pop 1990	Pop 2000	Pop 2010	Pop 2020	% 1980	% 1990	% 2000	% 2010	% 2020
White alone (NH)	105,478	152,601	207,236	265,294	272,471	89.96%	88.31%	83.43%	76.14%	67.32%
Black or African American alone (NH)	386	987	1,896	4,427	6,440	0.33%	0.57%	0.76%	1.27%	1.59%
Native American or Alaska Native alone (NH)	1,131	1,608	1,687	2,080	2,010	0.96%	0.93%	0.68%	0.60%	0.50%
Asian alone (NH)	1,721	3,635	7,148	19,963	34,776	1.47%	2.10%	2.88%	5.73%	8.59%
Native Hawaiian or Pacific Islander alone (NH)	x	x	324	697	967	0.13%	0.20%	0.13%	0.20%	0.24%
Other race alone (NH)	320	94	336	603	2,091	0.27%	0.05%	0.14%	0.17%	0.52%
Mixed race or Multiracial (NH)	x	x	5,753	10,658	25,356	x	x	2.32%	3.06%	6.26%
Hispanic or Latino (any race)	8,211	13,871	24,019	44,710	60,628	7.00%	8.03%	9.67%	12.83%	14.98%
Total	117,247	172,796	248,399	348,432	404,739	100.00%	100.00%	100.00%	100.00%	100.00%

=== American Community Survey 2025 data ===
The United States Census Bureau estimated that in 2025, Placer County’s population was 442.081. It was also estimated that the county's population was 63,43% Non-Hispanic White, 16,70% Hispanic or Latino, 2,03% Non-Hispanic Black, 11,08% Asian, 0,49% Native American, 0,30% Pacific Islander, and 5,99% Multiracial.

Total	Population	Percentage
Non-Hispanic White	280.431	63,43%
Hispanic or Latino	73.809	16,70%
Non-Hispanic Black	8.962	2,03%
Asian	48.965	11,08%
Native American	2.147	0,49%
Pacific Islander	1.308	0,30%
Non-Hispanic Multiracial	26.459	5,99%

=== 2010 census ===
The 2010 United States census reported that Placer County had a population of 348,432. The racial makeup of Placer County was 290,977 (83.5%) White, 4,751 (1.4%) African American, 3,011 (0.9%) Native American, 20,435 (5.9%) Asian, 778 (0.2%) Pacific Islander, 13,375 (3.8%) from other races, and 15,105 (4.3%) from two or more races. There were 4,710 Hispanics or Latinos of any race (12.8%).

Population reported at 2010 United States census
The County	Total; Population	White	African; American	Native; American	Asian	Pacific; Islander	other races	two or more races	Hispanic or Latino (of any race)
Placer County	348,432	290,977	4,751	3,011	20,435	778	13,375	15,105	44,710
Incorporated cities and towns	Total; Population	White	African; American	Native; American	Asian	Pacific; Islander	other races	two or more races	Hispanic or Latino (of any race)
Auburn	13,330	11,863	100	129	240	9	405	584	1,331
Colfax	1,963	1,759	4	26	29	2	54	89	178
Lincoln	42,819	34,087	629	399	2,663	115	3,125	1,801	7,597
Loomis	6,430	5,733	33	74	169	12	149	260	568
Rocklin	56,974	47,047	858	410	4,105	150	1,538	2,866	6,555
Roseville	118,788	94,199	2,329	885	10,026	346	5,087	5,916	17,359
Census-designated places	Total; Population	White	African; American	Native; American	Asian	Pacific; Islander	other races	two or more races	Hispanic or Latino (of any race)
Alta	610	592	1	3	5	1	2	6	23
Carnelian Bay	524	493	1	4	14	0	1	11	13
Dollar Point	1,215	1,145	4	6	19	0	24	17	83
Dutch Flat	160	155	0	3	1	0	0	1	4
Foresthill	1,483	1,371	8	29	6	2	17	50	97
Granite Bay	20,402	17,960	148	138	1,152	28	222	754	1,260
Kings Beach	3,796	3,216	15	20	14	2	409	120	2,115
Kingvale‡	143	135	1	1	0	1	2	3	6
Meadow Vista	3,217	3,017	1	21	35	6	34	103	171
Newcastle	1,224	1,113	7	19	17	0	35	33	104
North Auburn	13,022	11,081	115	172	298	13	893	450	2,108
Penryn	831	718	3	22	32	3	27	26	79
Sheridan	1,238	1,026	7	20	13	3	113	56	253
Sunnyside-Tahoe City	1,557	1,480	3	4	15	1	32	22	84
Tahoe Vista	1,433	1,279	3	8	21	2	82	38	352
Tahoma‡	411	393	4	3	7	0	1	3	16
Other unincorporated areas	Total; Population	White	African; American	Native; American	Asian	Pacific; Islander	other races	two or more races	Hispanic or Latino (of any race)
All others not CDPs (combined)	57,003	51,248	478	616	1,554	83	1,125	1,899	4,360
‡ Note: these numbers reflect only the portion of these CDPs in Placer County

=== 2000 census ===
As of the census of 2000, there were 248,399 people, 93,382 households, and 67,701 families residing in the county. The population density was 177 inhabitants per square mile (68/km^{2}). There were 107,302 housing units at an average density of 76 per square mile (29/km^{2}). The racial makeup of the county was 88.6% White, 0.8% Black or African American, 0.9% Native American, 3.0% Asian, 0.2% Pacific Islander, 3.4% from other races, and 3.2% from two or more races. 9.7% of the population were Hispanic or Latino of any race. 15.5% were of German, 12.3% English, 10.6% Irish, 7.1% Italian and 7.0% American ancestry according to Census 2000. 89.7% spoke only English at home; 6.0% spoke Spanish.

There were 93,382 households, out of which 35.3% had children under the age of 18 living with them, 59.4% were married couples living together, 9.2% had a female householder with no husband present, and 27.5% were non-families. 21.3% of all households were made up of individuals, and 8.1% had someone living alone who was 65 years of age or older. The average household size was 2.63 and the average family size was 3.06.

In the county, the population was spread out, with 26.5% under the age of 18, 6.9% from 18 to 24, 29.00% from 25 to 44, 24.5% from 45 to 64, and 13.1% who were 65 years of age or older. The median age was 38 years. For every 100 females, there were 96.4 males. For every 100 females age 18 and over, there were 93.9 males.

The median income for a household in the county was $57,535, and the median income for a family was $65,858 (these figures had risen to $68,463 and $80,987 respectively as of a 2007 estimate). Males had a median income of $50,410 versus $33,763 for females. The per capita income for the county was $27,963. About 3.9% of families and 5.8% of the population were below the poverty line, including 6.3% of those under age 18 and 3.8% of those age 65 or over. Unemployment in the county is just under 7% which is considerably lower than the state's average.

== Politics, government, and policing ==
=== Government ===
The Government of Placer County operates as a Charter County under the California Constitution and law and the Charter of the County of Placer and The County government is by a five-person four-year term elected board of supervisors from five single member districts with a board-appointed county manager and his/her department administrators.

=== Law enforcement ===
The Placer County Sheriff's Office provides court protection, jail administration, and coroner services for all of Placer County. It provides patrol, detective, and other police services for the unincorporated areas of the county plus by contract to the city of Colfax and the town of Loomis.

=== Politics ===
==== Voter registration ====
Population and registered voters
Total population	404,739	
Registered voters (Note: Percentage of registered voters with respect to total population. Percentages of party members with respect to registered voters follow.)	291,479	72.02%
Democratic	91,719	31.47%
Republican	119,117	40.87%
Democratic–Republican spread	-27,398	-9.40%
American Independent	14,217	4.88%
Green	1,151	0.39%
Libertarian	5,203	1.79%
Peace and Freedom	895	0.31%
Unknown	1,141	0.39%
Other	2,051	0.7%
No party preference	55,985	19.21%

==== Cities by population and voter registration ====
Cities by population and voter registration
City	Population	Registered voters	Democratic	Republican	D–R spread	Third parties, Unknown, Other	No party preference
Auburn	13,776	10,072	3,488	3,724	-2.34%	932	1,928
Colfax	1,995	1,178	302	481	-15.20%	142	253
Lincoln	49,757	39,135	12,368	16,676	-11.01%	3,235	6,856
Loomis	6,836	5,070	1,121	2,566	-28.50%	478	905
Rocklin	71,601	47,936	15,142	19,173	-8.41%	4,018	9,603
Roseville	147,773	103,882	35,396	39,078	-3.54%	8,382	21,026
Unincorporated Areas	113,001	84,206	23,902	37,419	-16.05%	7,471	15,414

=== Overview ===
In its early history Placer County was solidly Republican: it voted Republican in every election between 1860 and 1912, when Bull Moose nominee Theodore Roosevelt was California's official Republican nominee. Between 1916 and 1976, however, the county voted Republican only in three landslide elections of 1920, 1952 and 1972 – in all of which its GOP margins were much smaller than for the state or nation. Since the "Reagan Revolution" Placer County has become and remained a stronghold of the Republican Party; it consistently elects Republican public officials and has voted for presidential candidates from the party in every election since 1980. However, since 2008 Democrats have managed to at least obtain 40%.

United States presidential election results for Placer County, California
Year	Republican		Democratic		Third party(ies)	
Year	No.	%	No.	%	No.	%
1880	1,643	52.71%	1,416	45.43%	58	1.86%
1884	1,749	52.89%	1,483	44.84%	75	2.27%
1888	1,761	52.35%	1,547	45.99%	56	1.66%
1892	1,743	49.27%	1,524	43.08%	271	7.66%
1896	1,890	51.41%	1,721	46.82%	65	1.77%
1900	2,009	54.64%	1,592	43.30%	76	2.07%
1904	2,050	62.61%	1,023	31.25%	201	6.14%
1908	1,865	51.45%	1,491	41.13%	269	7.42%
1912	15	0.34%	1,823	41.84%	2,519	57.82%
1916	1,954	33.74%	3,375	58.28%	462	7.98%
1920	2,894	59.44%	1,559	32.02%	416	8.54%
1924	2,192	36.63%	390	6.52%	3,402	56.85%
1928	3,669	49.25%	3,685	49.46%	96	1.29%
1932	2,242	25.82%	6,200	71.40%	241	2.78%
1936	2,321	22.34%	7,959	76.62%	108	1.04%
1940	3,887	31.26%	8,402	67.56%	147	1.18%
1944	4,196	36.78%	7,149	62.66%	64	0.56%
1948	5,570	36.87%	8,837	58.49%	702	4.65%
1952	9,841	50.59%	9,444	48.55%	168	0.86%
1956	9,059	45.89%	10,611	53.76%	69	0.35%
1960	10,439	43.75%	13,304	55.75%	120	0.50%
1964	9,389	33.92%	18,256	65.96%	31	0.11%
1968	12,427	42.64%	14,050	48.21%	2,667	9.15%
1972	18,597	50.34%	16,911	45.77%	1,437	3.89%
1976	18,154	45.03%	21,026	52.16%	1,131	2.81%
1980	28,179	54.78%	17,311	33.65%	5,950	11.57%
1984	38,035	62.94%	21,294	35.24%	1,098	1.82%
1988	42,096	59.59%	27,516	38.95%	1,030	1.46%
1992	38,298	41.92%	30,783	33.69%	22,285	24.39%
1996	49,808	52.75%	34,981	37.05%	9,638	10.21%
2000	69,835	59.28%	42,449	36.04%	5,515	4.68%
2004	95,969	62.61%	55,573	36.26%	1,736	1.13%
2008	94,647	54.68%	75,112	43.39%	3,348	1.93%
2012	99,921	58.32%	66,818	39.00%	4,583	2.68%
2016	95,138	52.03%	73,509	40.20%	14,192	7.76%
2020	122,488	52.10%	106,869	45.46%	5,727	2.44%
2024	123,941	52.77%	103,958	44.26%	6,972	2.97%

In the United States House of Representatives, Placer County is within California's 3rd congressional district, represented by Kevin Kiley (I–Rocklin).

In the California State Senate, Placer County is split between the 1st, 4th, and 6th districts, represented by Megan Dahle, Marie Alvarado-Gil, and Roger Niello, respectively.

In the California State Assembly, the county is split between the 1st, 3rd, and 5th districts, represented by Heather Hadwick, Vacant, and Joe Patterson respectively.

=== Crime ===
The following table includes the number of incidents reported and the rate per 1,000 persons for each type of offense.

Population and crime rates
Population	343,554	
Violent crime	816	2.38
Homicide	6	0.02
Forcible rape	61	0.18
Robbery	156	0.45
Aggravated assault	593	1.73
Property crime	4,274	12.44
Burglary	1,606	4.67
Larceny-theft (Note: Only larceny-theft cases involving property over $400 in value are reported as property crimes.)	5,513	16.05
Motor vehicle theft	711	2.07
Arson	42	0.12

=== Cities by population and crime rates ===
Cities by population and crime rates
City	Population	Violent crimes	Violent crime rate per 1,000 persons	Property crimes	Property crime rate per 1,000 persons
Auburn	13,787	44	3.19	249	18.06
Lincoln	44,378	14	0.32	506	11.40
Rocklin	58,865	49	0.83	917	15.58
Roseville	122,896	293	2.38	3,288	26.75

== Economy ==
=== Top employers ===
According to the county's 2010 Comprehensive Annual Financial Report, the top employers in the county are:

#	Employer	# of Employees
1	Kaiser Permanente	3,064
2	Hewlett-Packard	2,500
3	Placer County	2,400
4	Union Pacific Railroad	2,000
5	Sutter Health	1,983
6	Northstar at Tahoe	1,500
7	Thunder Valley Casino Resort	1,412
8	City of Roseville	1,282
9	PRIDE Industries	1,135
10	Raley's Supermarkets	1,006

=== mPOWER Placer ===
mPOWER Placer is Placer County's Property Assessed Clean Energy (PACE) program. It provides financing to commercial, industrial, agricultural and multifamily property owners to install energy efficiency, water conservation and renewable energy retrofits. The program, administered by the Placer County Treasurer-Tax Collector’s Office, was approved by the Board of Supervisors on February 9, 2010, and launched on March 22, 2010, and is open to eligible Placer County property owners.

== Transportation ==
=== Major highways ===
- Interstate 80
- State Route 20
- State Route 28
- State Route 49
- State Route 65
- State Route 89
- State Route 174
- State Route 193
- State Route 267

=== Public transportation ===
- Placer County Transit provides basic bus service primarily along the I-80 corridor between Alta and the Watt Ave. Sacramento Regional Transit light rail station. PCT also runs commuter service to Downtown Sacramento.
- Roseville has its own local fixed route transit service and a commuter service to Sacramento. Lincoln previously operated transit and Auburn operates a dial-a-ride service.
- Nevada County Connects (Nevada County) provides a connection between Auburn and Grass Valley.
- Tahoe Truckee Area Regional Transit, operated by Placer County and the City of Truckee, operates in Truckee (Nevada County), Tahoe City and along the North Shore of Lake Tahoe to Incline Village, Nevada.
- Greyhound and Amtrak provide long-distance intercity service.

=== Airports ===
There are three general aviation airports in Placer County:

- Lincoln Regional Airport
- Auburn Airport
- Truckee-Tahoe Airport

The closest commercial airport is Sacramento International Airport in Sacramento.

== Communities ==
=== Cities ===
- Auburn (county seat)
- Colfax
- Lincoln
- Rocklin
- Roseville

=== Towns ===
- Loomis

=== Census-designated places ===
- Alta
- Carnelian Bay
- Cedar Flat
- Dollar Point
- Dutch Flat
- Foresthill
- Granite Bay
- Kings Beach
- Kingvale
- Meadow Vista
- Newcastle
- North Auburn
- Penryn
- Sheridan
- Sunnyside-Tahoe City
- Tahoe Vista
- Tahoma

=== Unincorporated communities ===
- Applegate
- Baxter
- Blue Canyon
- Bowman
- Brockway
- Emigrant Gap
- Iowa Hill
- Northstar
- Ophir
- Olympic Valley
- Weimar
- Michigan Bluff

=== Population ranking ===
The population ranking of the following table is based on the 2020 census of Placer County.

† county seat

Rank	City/Town/etc.	Municipal type	Population (2020 Census)
1	Roseville	City	147,773
2	Rocklin	City	71,601
3	Lincoln	City	49,757
4	Granite Bay	CDP	21,247
5	† Auburn	City	13,776
6	North Auburn	CDP	13,452
7	Loomis	Town	6,836
8	Kings Beach	CDP	3,563
9	Meadow Vista	CDP	3,263
10	Colfax	City	1,995
11	Foresthill	CDP	1,692
12	Sunnyside-Tahoe City	CDP	1,555
13	Tahoe Vista	CDP	1,392
14	Sheridan	CDP	1,385
15	Newcastle	CDP	1,321
16	Dollar Point	CDP	1,261
17	Penryn	CDP	1,150
18	Tahoma (partially in El Dorado County)	CDP	1,034
19	Alta	CDP	615
20	Carnelian Bay	CDP	518
21	Dutch Flat	CDP	183
22	Kingvale (mostly in Nevada County)	CDP	128
23	Auburn Rancheria	AIAN	2

== Education ==
School districts include:

Unified K-12:

- Center Joint Unified School District
- Rocklin Unified School District
- Tahoe-Truckee Unified School District
- Western Placer Unified School District

Secondary school districts:

- East Nicolaus Joint Union High School District
- Placer Union High School District
- Roseville Joint Union High School District

Additionally, Twin Rivers Unified School District includes a section of the county for grades 9–12 only.

Elementary school districts:

- Ackerman Elementary School District
- Alta-Dutch Flat Union Elementary School District
- Auburn Union Elementary School District
- Colfax Elementary School District
- Dry Creek Joint Elementary School District
- Elverta Joint Elementary School District
- Eureka Union School District
- Foresthill Union Elementary School District
- Loomis Union Elementary School District
- Newcastle Elementary School District
- Placer Hills Union Elementary School District
- Pleasant Grove Joint Union Elementary School District
- Roseville City Elementary School District

== See also ==
- List of school districts in Placer County, California
- National Register of Historic Places listings in Placer County, California
