= Swanston Estates =

Neighborhood in North Sacramento, California, US

Coordinates: 38.6079°N 121.4259°W

Swanston Estates is a neighborhood in North Sacramento, California. It is bordered by Arden Way on the south, Ethan Way on the East, Business 80 on the west, and El Camino Avenue on the north. This area lies behind the shopping mall Arden Fair.

== History ==
Swanston Estates is named for the Swanston family, which owned a 2,800-acre (11 km^{2}) cattle ranch and a meatpacking plant located at the Southern Pacific tracks from 1914 until the 1940s. The family sold much of the land to the state of California in the late 1940s, which intended to build California Exposition there. The state didn't use all of the land for that purpose and sold the unused land in 1970 for $7.3 million, at which point it saw commercial and residential development.

In March 1954, the development firm Heraty and Gannon purchased 234 acres (95 ha) of land for $850,000 to build Swanston Estates. The planned community was to be located on Ethan Way and Arden Way across from California Exposition, the site of the California State Fair. Plans for the property included a "mile long shopping area" on 100 acres (40 ha) along the North Sacramento Freeway and the Elvas Freeway, which opened in 1955.

After six years of planning a location in the Sacramento area, Sears Roebuck & Company announced a new store on the Swanston Estates property in December 1954. Opened in 1957 on 30 acres (12 ha) of land, the Sacramento location was the largest retail property operated by the company at the time. In 1956, Heraty and Gannon negotiated a 55-year lease with Frank Kassis, general manager of the Sacramento Stop-N-Shop grocery store chain, for an open-air shopping center development named Arden Fair, constructed on 25 acres (10 ha) directly east of Sears. The shopping mall opened in 1959.
