= Auburn Boulevard =

Highway connecting Sacramento and Roseville

Coordinates: 38.642°N 121.368°W

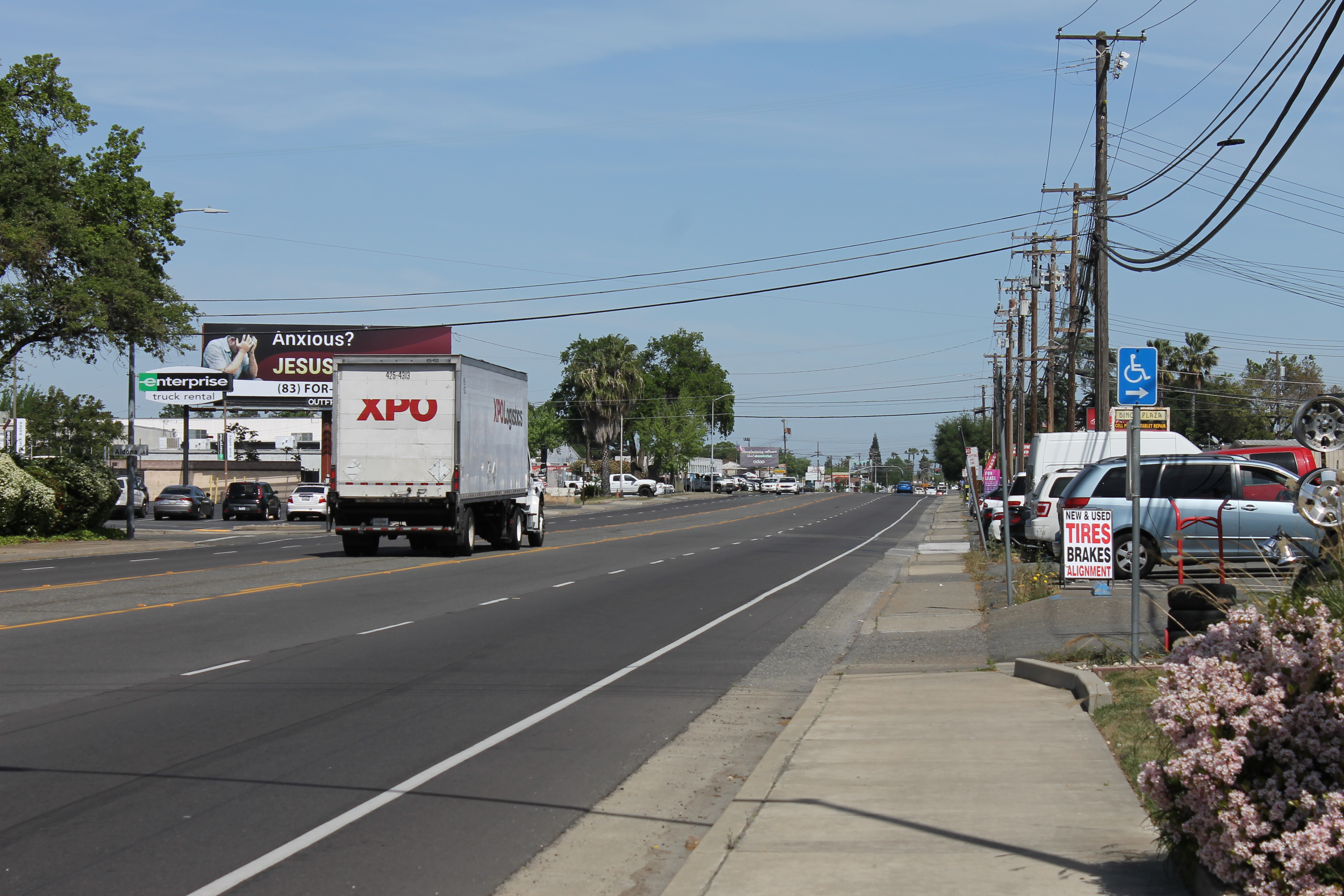
- Auburn Boulevard near its intersection with Orange Grove Avenue.
- Interactive map of Auburn Boulevard
- Maintained by: Sacramento Department of Transportation, Caltrans (at major state highway interchanges), the County of Sacramento Department of Transportation (SACDOT), Citrus Heights Public Works, and Roseville Public Works
- Location: Sacramento and Placer counties
- Southwest end: Manning and Harvard Streets in Sacramento
- Northeast end: I-80 in Roseville

Auburn Boulevard is a major thoroughfare in Sacramento County, California, United States, and a tiny portion in Placer County, California carrying surface street traffic through the cities and communities of Sacramento, Arden-Arcade, Foothill Farms, Citrus Heights, and Roseville. It was formerly part of U.S. Route 40, a former cross-country highway connecting downtown Sacramento to Roseville and points beyond. To a lesser extent, most of Auburn Boulevard was also part of U.S. Route 99E, an eastern branch of the former U.S. Route 99, now succeeded by State Route 99.

Auburn Boulevard was also known as part of both the Lincoln Highway and the Victory Highway during the period from 1915 until the late 1920s when the custom of named highways gave way to the convention of numbered highways in the U.S. Highway System. It served as US 40 in North Sacramento until the completion of the North Sacramento Freeway (present day State Route 160 and Business 80/Capital City Freeway) in the early 1950s, and that section was redesignated US 40 Business until the mid-1960s. The section of Auburn Boulevard east of Howe Avenue continued to carry US 40 until the completion of the Roseville Freeway (also present day Business 80/Capital City Freeway) in 1959.

US 40 was ultimately decommissioned in 1964 when California renumbered most of its highways. Interstate 80 in California is the successor to US 40 and its western terminus is currently with I-80 in Silver Summit, Utah.

For most of its length, Auburn Boulevard is a four-lane roadway carrying local and regional traffic. It is still known for the long chain of motels, trailer parks, restaurants, and gasoline stations that exist along its length that were built in the 20th century to accommodate the travelers of the automobile age. Many of these establishments have been closed or transferred, however many are still open to some capacity.

== Route description ==
Auburn Boulevard starts as a two-lane road in a fairly obscure location in the North Sacramento area of Sacramento where it meets the intersection of Manning Street and Harvard Street (the continuation of the roadway south of Manning), just below the El Camino Avenue overpass. After a junction with Van Ness Street (which connects to El Camino Avenue), it continues northeast, paralleling the SacRT light rail's Blue Line and Union Pacific railroad tracks to the west. As it reaches the Marconi Avenue overpass, the first segment of Auburn Boulevard ends at the intersection with Marconi Circle and Roseville Road (the continuation of the roadway northeast of Marconi).

A second segment of Auburn Boulevard reemerges just east of the intersection where the first segment ends and is a minor two-lane street between Marconi Circle and Connie Drive, just west of the Capital City Freeway (Business 80).

The third and longest segment of Auburn Boulevard begins on the other side of the Capital City Freeway at the intersection with Marconi Avenue and eastbound offramp traffic coming from the freeway. It starts out again as a two-lane road paralleling the Capital City Freeway to the north, acting as a frontage road. After Howe Avenue, it is here that Auburn Boulevard straddles the Sacramento city limits, with the unincorporated community of Arden-Arcade to the south, acting as its northern border. Despite running along the city limits, the road is maintained by SACDOT, Sacramento County's Public Works department. As it approaches Fulton Avenue, the roadway expands to four lanes and remains at least four lanes for the remainder of the route. It begins to veer away from the Capital City Freeway as it approaches Watt Avenue. After skirting Del Paso Regional Park to the north and meeting both Winding Way and the ramps to both I-80 and Business 80/Capital City Freeway (unsigned SR 244), Auburn Boulevard departs from the city of Sacramento and enters the unincorporated community of Foothill Farms. Auburn Boulevard continues northeast through the community, passing Madison Avenue. As it approaches Manzanita Avenue, the roadway enters the city of Citrus Heights. After passing Greenback Lane (CR E14) it continues northeast until it reaches the intersection with Sylvan Road and Old Auburn Road, where Auburn Boulevard turns north. After passing Antelope Road, Auburn Boulevard approaches its northeastern end as it enters Placer County and the city of Roseville, ending at I-80. The roadway itself continues into downtown Roseville as Riverside Avenue.

== Local transportation ==
RT bus routes 1, 21, 25, 26, 82, 93, and 193 operate on Auburn Boulevard. The Louis Orlando Transit Center at the northeastern end of Auburn Boulevard in Roseville provides transfers to Roseville Transit bus routes A, B, and R and Placer County Transit bus route 10.

== Major intersections ==
| County | Location | mi | km | Destinations | Notes |
|---|---|---|---|---|---|
| Sacramento | Sacramento | | | Manning Street | Southwestern terminus; road continues south as Harvard Street towards Arden Way |
| Sacramento | Sacramento | | | Van Ness Street | Connects to El Camino Avenue (former US 40 west) |
| Sacramento | Sacramento | | | Marconi Circle | Road continues northeast as Roseville Road |
| Sacramento | Sacramento | | | Gap in route | |
| Sacramento | Sacramento | | | Marconi Circle | |
| Sacramento | Sacramento | | | Connie Drive | |
| Sacramento | Sacramento | | | Gap in route | |
| Sacramento | Sacramento | | | Marconi Avenue | No left turn southbound |
| Sacramento | Sacramento | | | I-80 BL east (Capital City Freeway) / Howe Avenue | Interchange; former I-80 east; I-80 BL east exit 12A |
| Sacramento | Sacramento–Arden-Arcade line | | | Fulton Avenue to I-80 BL (Capital City Freeway) | |
| Sacramento | Sacramento–Arden-Arcade line | | | I-80 BL west (Capital City Freeway) – Sacramento | Interchange; southbound exit and northbound entrance; former I-80 west; I-80 BL east exit 14A |
| Sacramento | Sacramento–Arden-Arcade line | | | Watt Avenue | |
| Sacramento | Sacramento | | | I-80 / I-80 BL west (Capital City Freeway) – San Francisco, Reno | Unsigned SR 244; I-80 west is former I-880 west; I-80 BL west is former I-80 west; I-80 east exit 94B; I-80 BL east exit 14C, west exit 14A (access from I-80 west is via exit 95) |
| Sacramento | Foothill Farms | | | Madison Avenue | |
| Sacramento | Citrus Heights | | | Greenback Lane (CR E14) | |
| Sacramento | Citrus Heights | | | Old Auburn Road, Sylvan Road | |
| Sacramento | Citrus Heights | | | Antelope Road | |
| Placer | Roseville | | | I-80 – Reno, Sacramento | Interchange; northeastern terminus; I-80 exit 102 |
| Placer | Roseville | | | Riverside Avenue | Continuation beyond I-80; former US 40 east / US 99E north / SR 65 north |
1.000 mi = 1.609 km; 1.000 km = 0.621 mi: Incomplete access
