= Arden Fair =

Mall in Sacramento, California

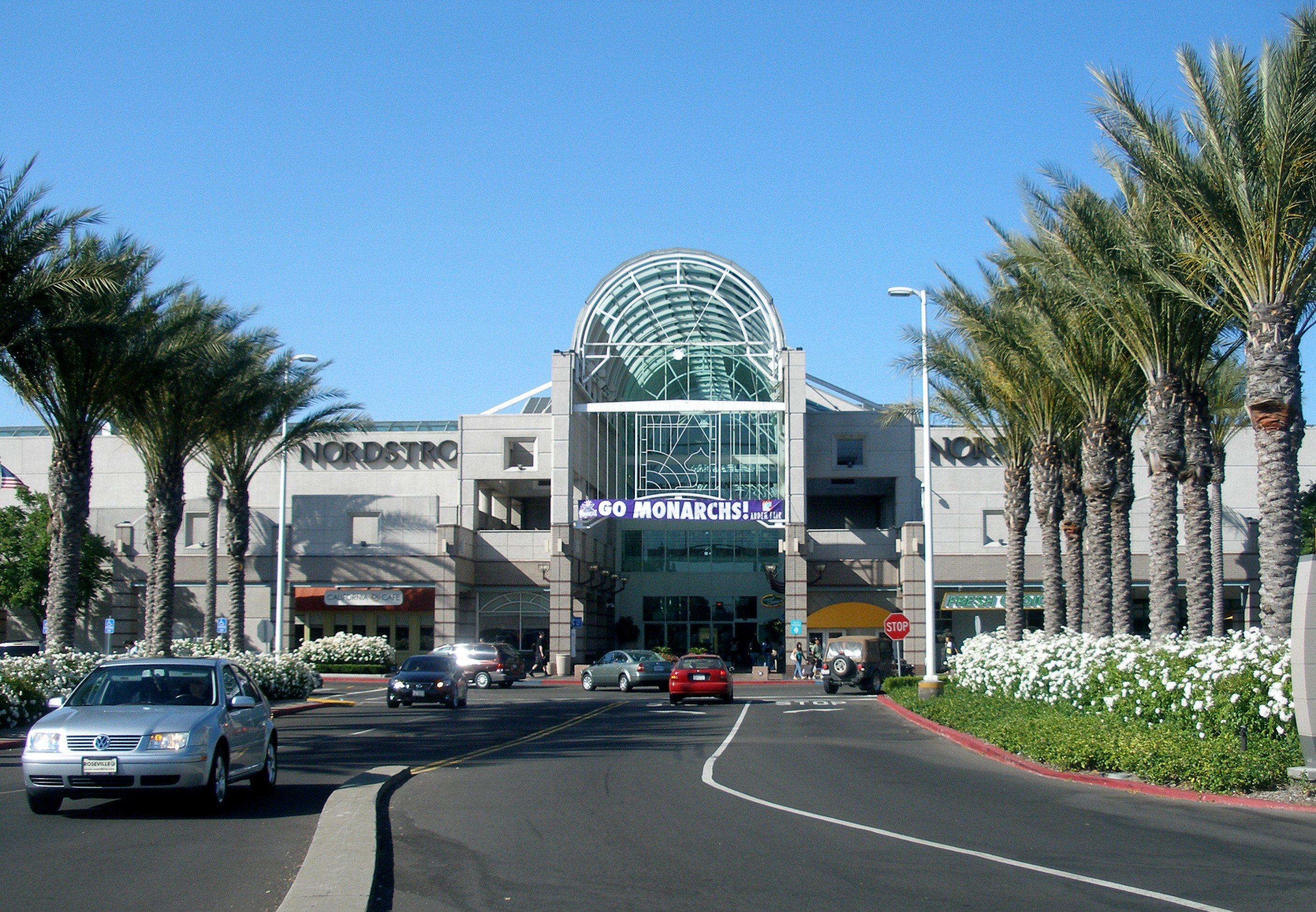
- Arden Fair main entrance
- Location: Sacramento, California, United States
- Coordinates: 38.60137°N 121.42697°W
- Address: 1689 Arden Way, Sacramento, California, 95815
- Opened: May 15, 1957; 69 years ago
- Renovated: 1989 – 1990
- Developer: Kassis Investment
- Manager: Centennial Real Estate Company
- Owner: Fulcrum Property
- Architect: Altoon + Porter
- Num. of stores: Over 150
- Num. of anchor tenants: 3 (2 open, 1 under construction)
- Floor area: 1,112,000 square feet (103,300 m^{2})
- Floors: 2 (3 in Macy's and JCPenney)
- Parking: Over 6,000
- Public transit: SacRT: 13, 23, 67, 68, 129
- Website: ardenfair.com

Arden Fair is a two-level regional shopping mall located on Arden Way in Sacramento, California, in the United States. It encompasses 1,112,000 square feet (103,300 m^{2}) of retail space occupied by over 150 tenants. The mall is anchored by Macy's, JCPenney, and a Dick’s House of Sport expected to open in 2027. A fourth anchor tenant building, left vacant after Nordstrom closed in May 2020, was repurposed, with its lower level leased by the furniture store RH.

Arden Fair was developed as an open-air complex by the firm Kassis Investment, with Sears opening in 1957 as the mall's first store. After its conversion into a single-story indoor mall, a second level was added during a major renovation conducted by the Homart Development Company in 1990. The property was purchased by the Sacramento-based Friedman family, who currently owns the mall under Fulcrum Property. Adjacent to the mall is the Market Square at Arden Fair, a shopping center renovated by the Friedmans from the former Food Circus property.

Arden Fair is credited with introducing major national retailers to the Sacramento area, including the first Nordstrom, Barnes & Noble, and Virgin Megastores in the region. By 2000, the mall was the largest single source of sales tax revenue for the City of Sacramento.

== History ==
=== Planning ===
In March 1954, the development firm Heraty and Gannon purchased 234 acres (95 ha) of land for $850,000 to build Swanston Estates. The planned community was to be located on Ethan Way and Arden Way across from California Exposition, the site of the California State Fair. Plans for the property included a "mile long shopping area" on 100 acres (40 ha) along the North Sacramento Freeway and the Elvas Freeway, which opened in 1955.

After six years of planning a location in the Sacramento area, Sears Roebuck & Company announced a new store on the Swanston Estates property in December 1954. Sears purchased 28.5 acres (11.5 ha), of land from Heraty and Gannon for its Sacramento location, which was the largest retail property operated by the company at the time. Construction of the store began in March 1956, and it opened on May 15, 1957. The $3.5 million single-story structure covered 185,028 square feet (17,189.7 m^{2}) and was built of reinforced concrete and brick, with the facing scored into panels and finished in mica. A partial second story was constructed on the southwest section, occupied by the employee cafeteria and recreational rooms.

The Sears property was the first development in what would eventually become the current shopping complex. In September 1956, Frank Kassis, general manager of the Sacramento Stop-N-Shop grocery store chain and president of Kassis Investment Company, announced a 55-year lease had been negotiated with Heraty and Gannon for the development of a $2.5 million shopping center. According to Kassis, one of Sears' requirements when deciding on its Sacramento location was "that the area be developed as a shopping center". Kassis Investment—run by Frank with his brothers Lewis, Walter, and Edward—approached Gannon with the idea of a market on the property, to which he responded, "'Why not go ahead and develop it yourselves?'"

=== Development ===
Development plans were announced by Frank Kassis in October 1957, with the center to be named Arden Fair. The open-air complex was constructed on 25 acres (10 ha) directly east of Sears. Completed in 1959, over 36 specialty shops were housed in a 175,000 sq ft (16,300 m^{2}), 590 ft (180 m) long building designed by the architectural firm Dreyfuss and Blackford. Expansion continued in 1961, when Broadway-Hale Stores opened the third Hale's department store in the Sacramento area on 200,000 sq ft (19,000 m^{2}) of land purchased from Heraty and Gannon. Kassis Investment had approached Hale's with the proposal, believing that another major department store was necessary "for a successful shopping center". Located on the mall's east side, the two-story department store was converted to Weinstock's in 1967.

After a legal battle with the City of North Sacramento over annexation rights for the mall grounds, the City of Sacramento formally annexed Arden Fair in 1962. That year, the Kassis brothers announced the development of a new building in the shopping complex, located east of Hale's. With construction beginning in June 1963, the 100,000 sq ft (9,300 m^{2}) building was leased to more than 29 stores by 1964, including one of the first General Electric Service Centers in California and a new Stop-N-Shop location. Storefronts and interiors for individual tenants were separately designed but followed plans put forward by Dreyfuss and Blackford. At the same time, a 30,000-square-foot (2,800 m^{2}) expansion to Sears was constructed on its east side, making it one of the largest in the chain nationwide. At the time of the new building's opening, Arden Fair was the largest shopping center in the Sacramento Area. California sales tax figures reported by The Sacramento Bee indicated that Arden Fair accounted for 7.8% of retail business in Sacramento County in 1963, with around $33.85 million in taxable retail sales.

In 1965, the Kassis brothers opened the Arden Fair Food Circus, a 35,000 sq ft (3,300 m^{2}), cafeteria-style dining complex that could seat over 600 customers. Operating in the eastern structure, the space was leased to 16 different food stands that served a variety of cuisines, as well as a florist and gift shop. Seen as an early precursor to the shopping mall food court, Food Circus operated in the adjacent structure until 1987, when the Kassis brothers retired.

=== Remodels ===
In 1968, the New York City-based Kavanau Real Estate Trust purchased the 240,000 sq ft (22,000 m^{2}) mall (excluding the anchor tenants) from the Kassis brothers and the land from Heraty and Gannon for a combined $6.05 million. With a grand reopening in May 1971, the space between Weinstock's and Sears was converted into an indoor, heated and air-conditioned mall, and 75,000 sq ft (7,000 m^{2}) of retail space was added.

The mall was sold again in 1975 to two Sacramento locals: Dennis Marks, a pediatrician, and Morton Friedman, a developer, lawyer, and philanthropist who also purchased the Sacramento Town & Country Village shopping center. Friedman's family continues to own Arden Fair under Fulcrum Property, led by his son Mark Friedman. Friedman and Marks conducted several remodels of the mall, which received a major facelift in 1984, designed by architectural firm Dean Unger and associates. Projects in the 1984 renovation included the construction of a new entrance, interior landscaping, and refacing storefronts with entrances on Arden Way.

In the mid-1980s, the specialty retailer Nordstrom was looking to open a location in the Sacramento area. After one of several remodels of Arden Fair, Morton Friedman invited Jim Nordstrom on a tour of the mall. Offered a prominent location, Nordstrom responded that Friedman would have to "tear the whole damn thing down" first before a Nordstrom would open in the mall. Nordstrom later elaborated to The Sacramento Bee that the mall was "a great location, but it need[ed] a lot of updating". Agreeing to a tentative arrangement with Nordstrom, Friedman and Marks decided to conduct a major remodeling project to update the mall, persuading the department store to choose Arden Fair over other shopping malls in the region. The three-story department store cost $28 million to construct. Mark Friedman, Morton's son, recounted in 2020 about how proud his parents were in "bringing Nordstrom to the community".

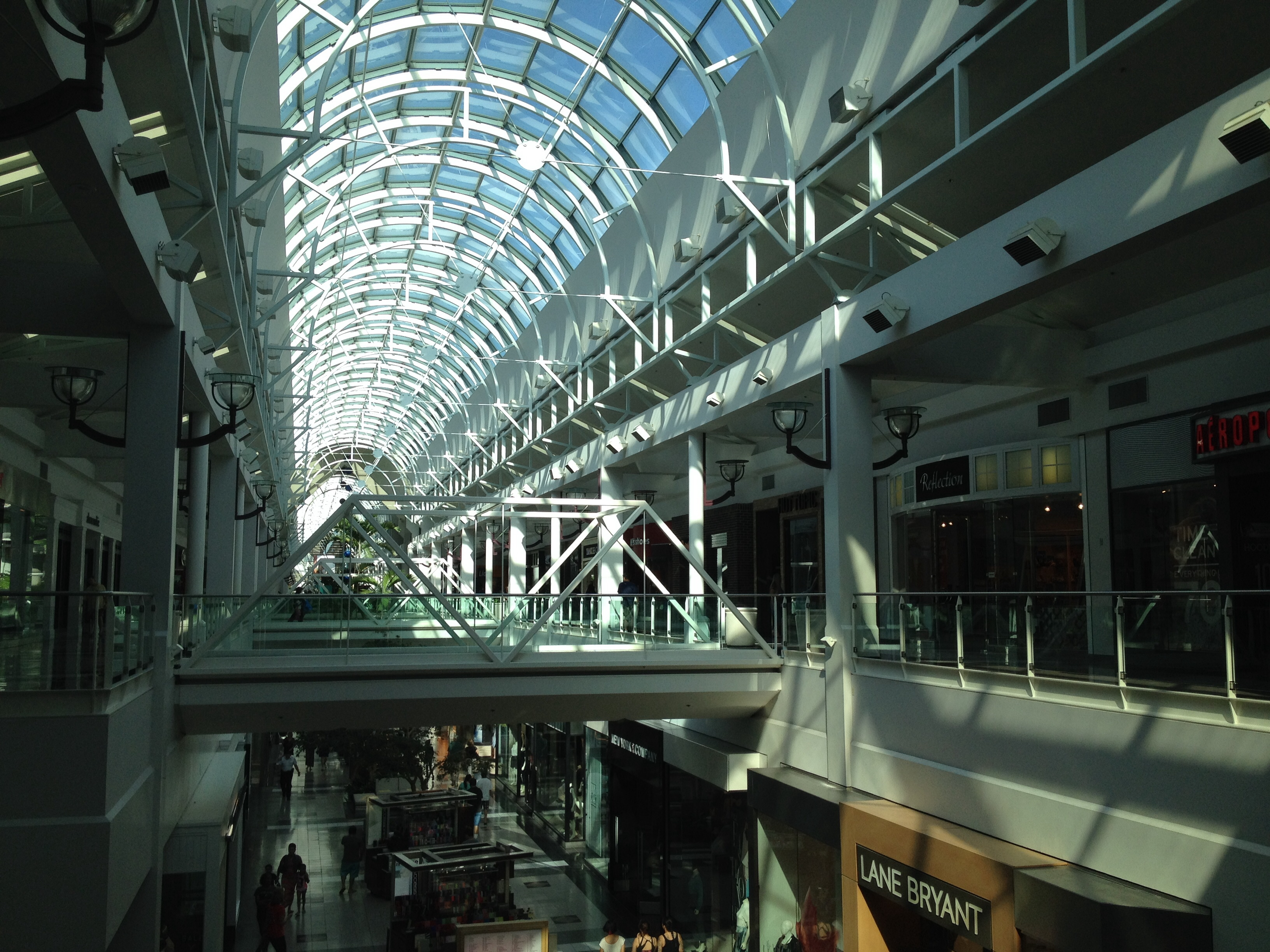
Arden Fair's second level, constructed in 1990

With renovation plans moving forward, Homart Development Company purchased half-ownership of the mall in 1987, acting as its managing partner. In January the following year, Homart initiated a three-phase, more than $100 million remodel of the mall, expanding it to just over 952,000 sq ft (88,400 m^{2}), introducing around 125 new tenants, and adding a second level with a food court. HCB Contractors, the general contractor for the project, had previously built Homart's two-level expansion of Montclair Place in Montclair, California, which was completed in 1985. The project was the second collaboration between the two companies. Nordstrom opened in the second phase, marking its first store in the Sacramento area. Adjacent to Nordstrom was a new parking garage and mall "Center Court". Other projects included a remodel of Weinstock's and the demolition of the original Sears building. Sears relocated to a new building west of the mall and physically connected to the mall in the final phase, completed in spring of 1990. In December 1993, the Chicago-based investment firm Heitman Financial acquired Homart's 50% share for $103 million.

The mall received its fourth anchor tenant in 1994, when JCPenney relocated from Country Club Plaza to Arden Fair. Originally planning to open in late 1991, the move was delayed by the city due to traffic concerns in the surrounding area, as initial reports projected 5,000 additional cars a day on already-congested roadways. With the opening of JCPenney, Arden Fair now encompassed over 1,100,000 sq ft (100,000 m^{2}) of retail space, surpassing Sunrise Mall in Citrus Heights as the largest mall in the Sacramento area. JCPenney replaced a six-screen United Artists movie theater in Arden Fair, which had opened in 1982 after an expansion of a theater originally built in 1969. Once the JCPenney relocation was confirmed, United Artists reopened in Market Square in November 1992.

As part of Federated Department Stores' acquisition of Broadway Stores, Weinstock's was converted into Macy's in 1996. Following a year-long remodel, the anchor store opened a third shopping level in the basement, which had previously been used as office space.

By 2000, Arden Fair was the City of Sacramento's largest single source of sales tax revenue, contributing 8.8% of total revenue that year and generating double the sales per square foot of Sacramento's Downtown Plaza. In the three months following the opening of rival mall Galleria at Roseville in 2000, Arden Fair's revenue growth slowed to 1%, compared to 20% growth during the same period in 1999. In response, the City of Sacramento entered a public-private partnership with the mall's owners, approving a $1.8 million project to improve Arden Fair's road access on Arden Way. The mall also renovated its bathrooms, food court, and signage, and added several carpeted seating areas.

The KCRA 3 Experience, a secondary studio of KCRA-TV open from 2004 to 2008

In early 2004, KCRA-TV, the NBC affiliate in Sacramento, opened "The KCRA 3 Experience", a secondary studio on the second floor of the mall that allowed shoppers to observe the live newscast production. Over the years, KCRA broadcast the news from the mall studio on weekdays at noon. The studio was discontinued and closed in late 2008.

=== Anchor changes ===
Although Arden Fair was a leading taxpayer up to 2005, its contribution to the city's sales tax income has since declined. According to the City of Sacramento, sales tax revenue from the mall decreased from $5.1 million in 2006 to $4.5 million in 2015. During the same period, the sales tax revenue from the Westfield Galleria at Roseville increased by nearly $1 million. In addition to competition with the Galleria, the decline was attributed to the migration of the region's population to the suburbs and the popularity of the new lifestyle centers developed near them, including Palladio at Broadstone in Folsom and Fountains in Roseville.

The effects of the COVID-19 pandemic on the brick and mortar retail industry resulted in the closure of two of Arden Fair's anchor stores. Arden Fair shut down operations on March 17, 2020, in response to the pandemic. In May 2020, during the mall shutdown, Nordstrom announced that the Arden Fair location would permanently remain closed, while Nordstrom would retain their store in Westfield Galleria at Roseville. According to Mark Friedman, the decision to close in Arden Fair eliminated about $5 million in annual sales taxes to area governments. In April 2021, Sears closed as part of a transition away from its traditional store format.

The mall's owner, Fulcrum Property, purchased the vacant Nordstrom building in 2021 and the Sears building in 2023, together nearly a third of the mall's gross leasable area. In an effort to reinvigorate the mall in response to the changes in the retail industry, Fulcrum relocated several tenants within Arden Fair in 2024 to make space for additional development. The retailers Uniqlo and H&M opened their first Sacramento locations at Arden Fair in September 2024. One of the spaces replaced by H&M was Lane Bryant, which had operated in the same location since its opening in the 1960s. Other planned developments to Arden Fair included exterior renovations and a redesigned food court. According to Fulcrum in 2024, the mall received 9 million shoppers per year, an increasing trend that is similar to pre-COVID statistics.

Dick's Sporting Goods and Restoration Hardware announced plans to open locations in Arden Fair in 2025, occupying the vacant anchor spaces. Restoration Hardware Outlet opened on the lower level of the former Nordstrom anchor in December 2025, occupying 45,000 sq ft (4,200 m^{2}). Dick's House of Sport is one of three planned concept stores in California slated to open in 2027 in the former Sears building, anchoring the mall. Redevelopment of the building began in April 2026, with the main entrance doors relocated and parts of the second floor removed to accommodate a central atrium with a skylight and a climbing wall. The former Sears auto repair center was demolished for a fenced, outdoor track and field facility around 18,600 square feet (1,730 m^{2}).

== Features ==
=== Facilities ===
As of 2021, Arden Fair encompasses 1,112,000 sq ft (103,300 m^{2}) of gross leasable area (GLA). The mall has spaces for four anchor tenants, with the following square footage: 156,927 sq ft (14,579.0 m^{2}) at the under-construction Dick’s House of Sport, formerly a Sears with an adjacent Sears auto repair shop; 188,000 sq ft (17,500 m^{2}) at the former Nordstrom, with the ground level currently occupied by Restoration Hardware; over 159,000 sq ft (14,800 m^{2}) at JCPenney; and 208,975 sq ft (19,414.4 m^{2}) at Macy's. Management of the mall is overseen by Dallas-based Centennial Real Estate Company, which assumed responsibility from Macerich on June 17, 2024.

Arden Fair is located on Arden Way and adjacent to Interstate 80 Business. In addition to surface parking lots, Arden Fair includes a three-story parking garage with 750 spaces, adjacent to the former Sears and Nordstrom. A two-story garage with 680 spaces opened in 1993 on the north side of the current Macy's, bringing the total number of parking spaces to more than 6,000. During the holiday season, the mall offers a free shuttle bus service to the parking lots at California Exposition across the street. Buses operated by the Sacramento Regional Transit District serve the mall via the "Arden Fair Transit Center", a bus stop established by the agency in 1982.

In 2002, solar panels were purchased from and installed by the Sacramento Municipal Utility District (SMUD) on Arden Fair's rooftops and a 66-space parking lot, used for valet parking. At the time, it was the largest commercial solar panel project in Sacramento County, capable of producing 34.6 kilowatts of power. The parking lot solar panels were removed in 2014, and the maintenance funds were redirected towards the remaining 250 rooftop solar panels. The following year, Macy's installed rooftop solar panels at its Arden Fair location.

According to Stephen Reed, retired Sacramento police officer and director of Arden Fair security for 15 years until 2014, the mall invested $2 million in security and installed more than 300 surveillance cameras. In a partnership with the Sacramento Police Department and with $100,000 in grants from the Department of Homeland Security, the mall installed license plate readers on mall security vehicles, which scanned for vehicles that matched those on a list provided by the California Department of Justice.

=== Market Square at Arden Fair ===
Virgin Megastores and Barnes & Noble at Market Square at Arden Fair in 2005

Market Square at Arden Fair was developed in 1990 by F&M, a partnership between Morton Friedman and Dennis Marks. With project coordination led by Friedman's wife, Marcy, the building was renovated from the former Food Circus into a 123,460 sq ft (11,470 m^{2}) strip, originally with 16 leasable spaces. Market Square was envisioned as a shopping, food, and entertainment center with a floor plan modeled after a European open market.

After failing to secure tenants for the indoor market concept, Mark Friedman, son of Morton and Marcy, endeavored to convert the space into an "entertainment complex built around media". In his efforts, Friedman commissioned architect Mark Dziewulski to develop a new store for Market Square, intended as the future location for the Sacramento-based record store Tower Records. After Tower Records declined, Friedman secured the London-based record store Virgin Megastores, which sought to establish a presence in the hometown of its competitor. Opening in 1994 as its third US location, the company occupied the multilevel store until its closure in 2005. Additionally, a six-screen United Artists theater, originally at Arden Fair, relocated to Market Square's largest space, a 36,860 sq ft (3,424 m^{2}) building that was formerly occupied by the Corti Brothers market since 1964. The theater closed in 2019, citing competition with a nearby Century Theatres that opened three years earlier.

Market Square is anchored by Barnes & Noble, the retailer's first location in the Sacramento area. The complex features a food court with various dining options and Crunch Fitness, a membership-based gym that opened in the area vacated by United Artists in 2023. On November 13, 2025, Fulcrum Property announced renovation plans for Market Square, which would re-imagine the architecture and introduce dining and entertainment locations.

=== Public art ===
In the 1980s, Arden Fair commissioned San Francisco artist Joan Brown for a series of public art installations at the mall, including ceramic tile benches in the form of cats and a 90 ft (27 m) mosaic sculpture embedded in the floor, depicting silhouettes of animals. The since-removed pieces incorporated symbolic and sacred forms seen by Brown in her travels to Egypt and India. As a tribute to Brown and the removed mall artwork, a sculpture of a calico cat was collaboratively constructed in 2017 in nearby Davis, California. Egyptian motifs were also used for the entrance monument constructed during the 1990 remodel, a pyramid flanked by four neon-lit pillars.

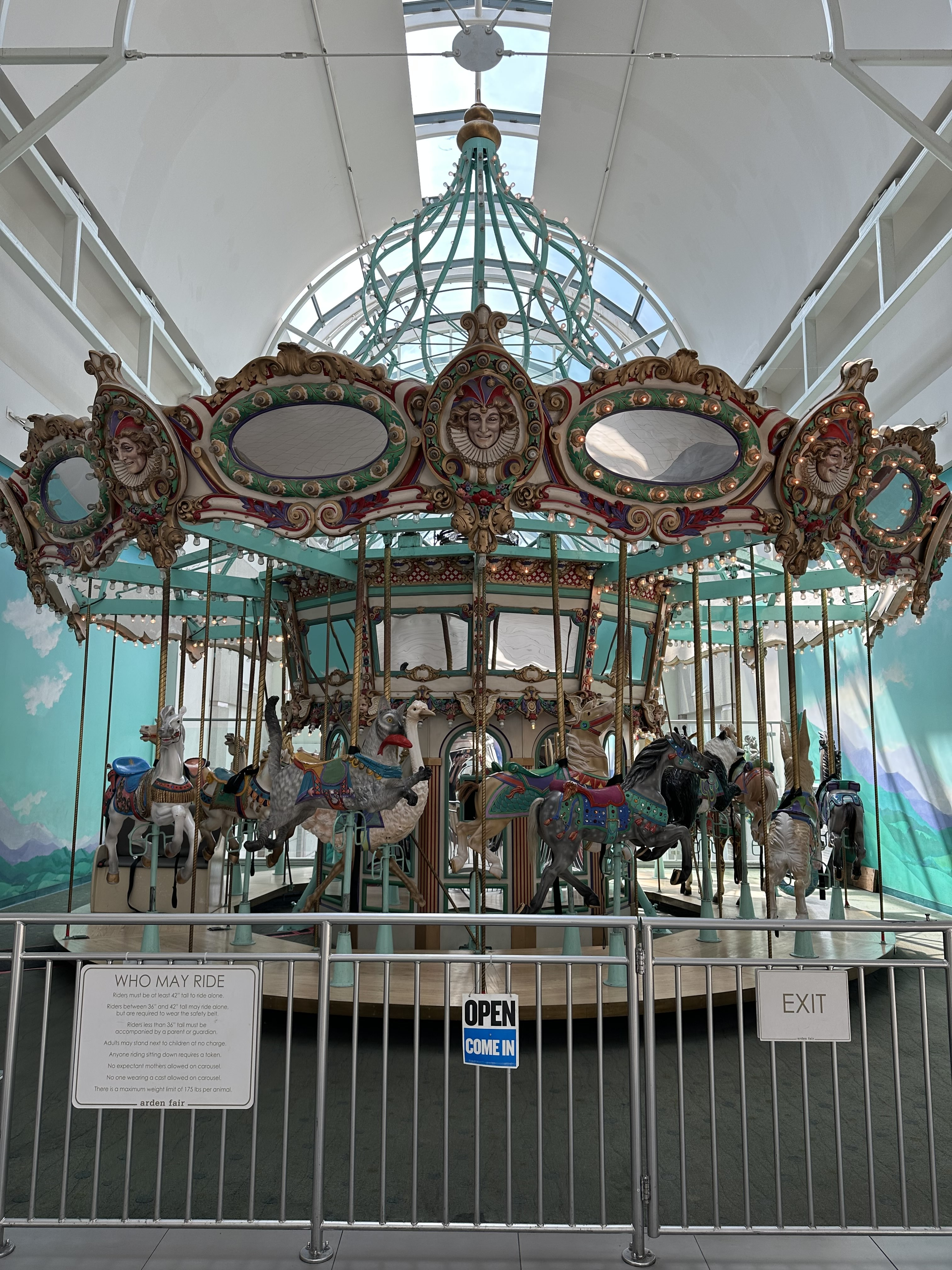
The custom carousel on Arden Fair's second floor

Arden Fair operates a custom-made carousel on its second level, opposite the former Nordstrom. The 22,000-pound (10,000 kg) attraction, measuring 30 ft (9.1 m) in diameter and 45 ft (14 m) in height, debuted in 1992 following a structural reinforcement of the upper level. Constructed by carousel manufacturer John Barrango, its 20 moving animals and a stationary chariot were cast in fiberglass and hand-painted. The addition of Arden Fair's carousel is a reflection of the wider trend of converting shopping malls into entertainment centers, such as the opening of the Mall of America with an indoor amusement park the same year.

A 40 ft (12 m), three-sided LED display was installed on the mall's elevator shaft in Center Court in 2014, Originally intended to display advertisements and video artwork, the installation was used by Arden Fair to host an art contest in 2016, called "Elevate: An Art Exhibition". Shoppers were able to vote for the digital work of 12 local graphic artists, displayed on the screens on a 15-minute loop.

Since 2018, Arden Fair operates a public art program called "unchARTed", which was developed with the marketing agency UpperCloud media. The program organizes free events and installations, showcasing work from Sacramento-area artists. Past temporary art installations at the mall include an LED sculpture, synced to live music performed by the Sacramento Youth Symphony, and "HeART of Sacramento", an art gallery featuring African-American artists from Sacramento. Other ventures by unchARTed include a concert series in a vacant storefront in 2019, featuring local Sacramento musicians, and a 2021 contest in collaboration with the arts program of the professional soccer team Sacramento Republic FC.

== Architecture ==
=== Current ===
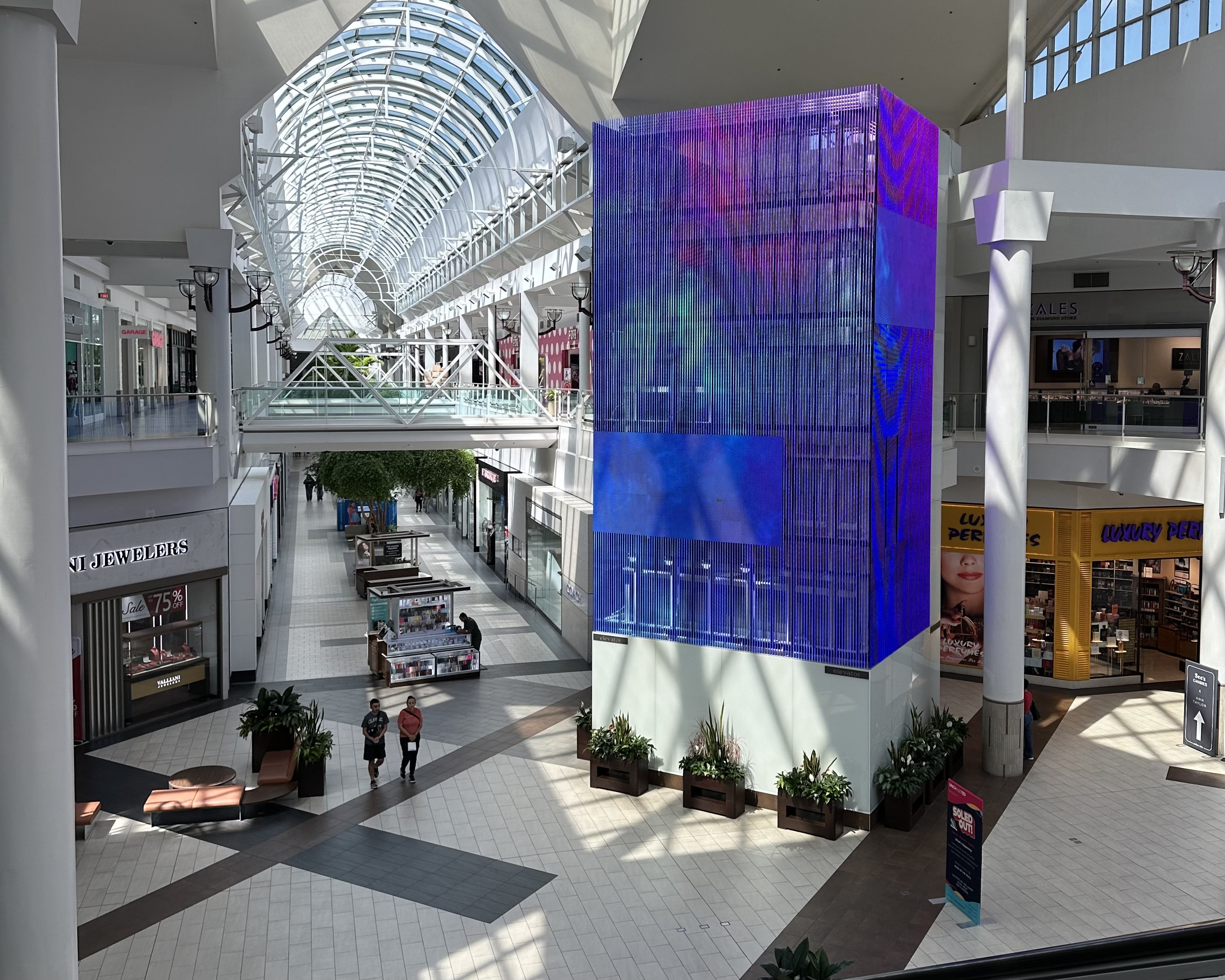
Center Court as seen from the second floor, with a view into the west arcade. An LED display was installed on the mall's elevator in 2014.

The 1990 remodel of Arden Fair was conducted by the architectural firm Altoon and Porter, which explored the mall's civic role as a city center of the state's capital. Intending to reflect Sacramento's growth and imbue retail architecture with a sense of civic institution, the firm modified and incorporated elements from classical architecture as well as Beaux-Arts, a style traditionally used in public buildings and landmarks. Individual elements—including the handrails, lighting fixtures, elevators, stairs, and escalators—were designed to create a cohesive whole that is representative of the mall's civic presence.

The ceiling of Arden Fair's east and west arcades is barrel vaulted with 40,000 sq ft (3,700 m^{2}) of arched, green-tinted glass skylights, reminiscent of a conservatory in the Victorian architectural style. At the Center Court, the skylights merge into a 85 ft (26 m)-tall glass rooftop that extends over the entrance of the mall. Supporting the weight of the second floor are 114 steel columns, stretching as high as 90 ft (27 m) and buttressed by joists that are clear span. Most of the columns sit between storefronts, slightly protruding. On the second floor, balconies with handrails made of brass and glass overlook the ground level. A domed, glass-back, 144 sq ft (13.4 m^{2}) elevator in Center Court and four pairs of escalators connect the two levels, while fourteen mall bridges facilitate travel on the second floor. Altoon and Porter won the International Council of Shopping Centers (ICSC) design award in 1991 for the remodel of Arden Fair.

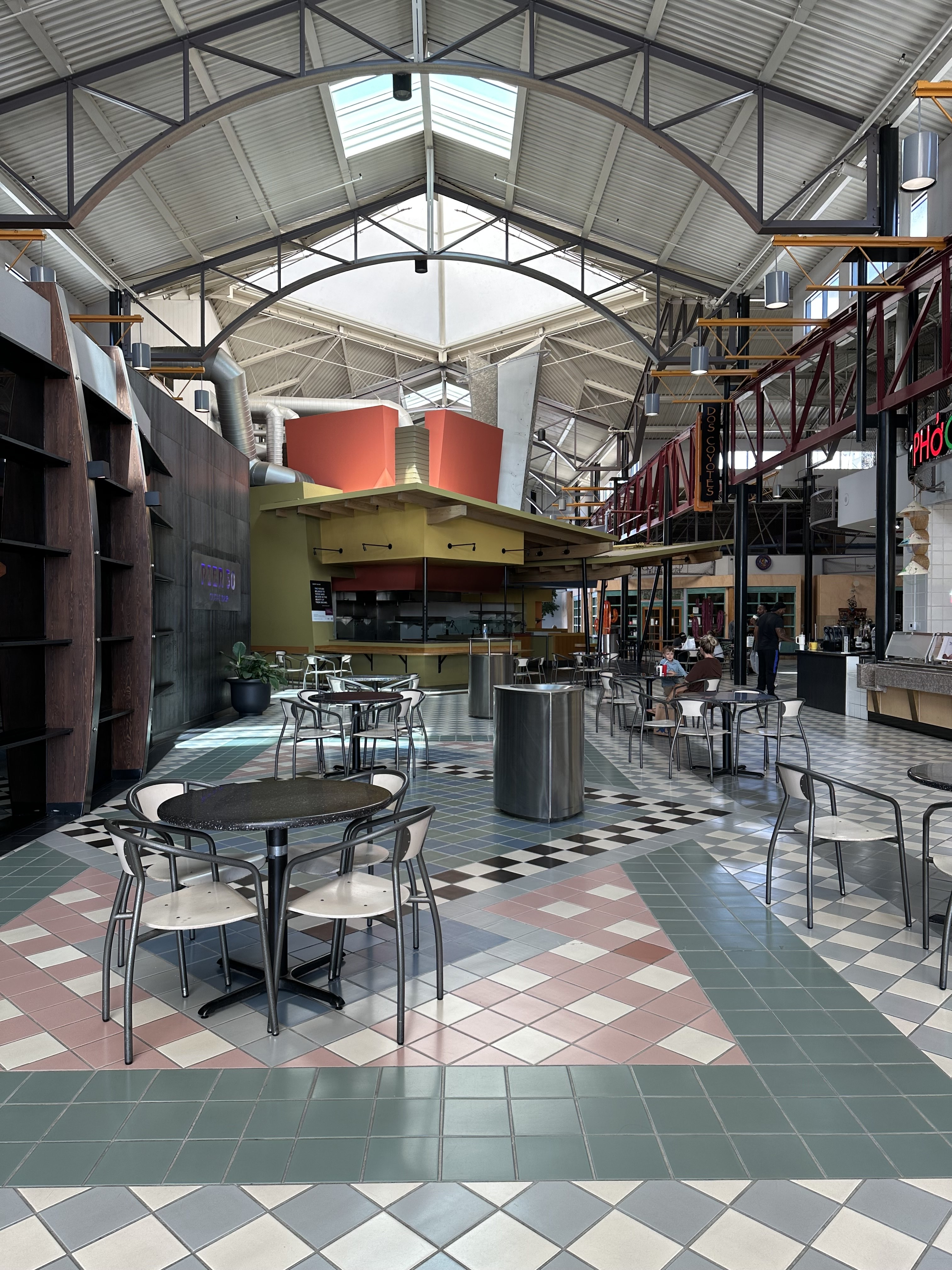
Interior of Market Square at Arden Fair

Altoon and Porter also designed the Market Square at Arden Fair. For this project, the company drew influence from the lifestyles of local citizens, second-generation immigrants who maintained strong cultural ties abroad. As a result, the center was modeled after a European market, with a skylight made from Teflon-coated fiberglass. Noting the variety of retailers occupying the space, Altoon and Porter identified the center as "distinctively American in character". The Sacramento Bee described the facade of the new building as a "more modern, colorful look that architecturally complements Arden Fair". In 1996, Altoon and Porter again received the ICSC design award for their design of Market Square.

=== 1984 remodel ===
The 1984 remodel was designed by architectural firm Dean Unger and associates, focusing on the area between Weinstock's and Sears. The mall's main entrance was rebuilt with 30 ft (9.1 m) steel and glass domes with lit arches. Outside, storefront entrances were redone with multicolored canvas canopies. The facade was bricked over and cut back to install 30 and 40-foot flagpoles. The sidewalk was redesigned to create a meandering walk with raised planters and seating. Trees and landscaping, paired with a canvas canopy and colored-glass skylights, created a "garden-like" atmosphere in the mall's interior.
