= Town & Country Village =

Town & Country Village can be one of these shopping centers:

- Town & Country Village (Houston), the upscale shopping center in Houston, Texas
- Town & Country Village (Sacramento), a specialty shopping center in Arden Arcade, California
- Town & Country Village (Palo Alto), the shopping center in Palo Alto, California
