= KEZT-CD =

Television station in Sacramento, California

Translator of KUVS-DT, Modesto, California

- Sacramento, California; United States
- Channels: Digital: 34 (UHF); Virtual: 23
- Branding: see KUVS-DT infobox

Programming
- Affiliations: 23.1: Univision; 23.2: UniMás; for others, see § Subchannels

Ownership
- Owner: TelevisaUnivision; (UniMas Sacramento LLC)
- Sister stations: KUVS-DT, KTFK-DT

History
- First air date: June 12, 1997
- Former call signs: K23DH (1992–1993); K08LC (1993); K23DH (1993–1997); K08LC (1997); K23ES (1997–2001); KEZT-CA (2001–2012)
- Former channel numbers: Analog: 23 (UHF, 1992–2012); Digital: 23 (UHF, 2012–2020)
- Former affiliations: The Box (1990s–2000); MTV2 (2001–2002); TeleFutura (2002–2004); HSN (2004–2014)

Technical information
- Licensing authority: FCC
- Facility ID: 52891
- Class: CD
- ERP: 15 kW
- HAAT: 85.6 m (281 ft)
- Transmitter coordinates: 38°33′58.9″N 121°28′50.4″W

Links
- Public license information: Public file; LMS
- Website: Univision 19

KEZT-CD (channel 23) is a low-power, Class A television station in Sacramento, California, United States. It is a translator of Modesto-licensed Univision outlet KUVS-DT (channel 19) which is owned and operated by TelevisaUnivision. KEZT-CD's transmitter is located on 22nd Street in downtown Sacramento. Its parent station shares studios with Stockton-licensed duopoly partner and UniMás owned-and-operated station KTFK-DT (channel 64) on Arden Way near Cal Expo in Sacramento.

== History ==
KEZT first aired programming from The Box in the 1990s and 2000, later affiliating with MTV2 in 2001 after The Box ceased operations. The station switched to Spanish-language programming briefly in 2002 as a charter affiliate of the newly-launched Telefutura (now UniMás). When KTFK-TV (channel 64) was acquired by Univision Communications (now TelevisaUnivision) in 2003, it assumed the Telefutura affiliation in 2004 and channel 23 switched back to English-language programming as an affiliate of HSN. This made KEZT one of two television stations owned by Univision at the time to broadcast in English (along with KUVI-TV, the UPN affiliate at the time in Bakersfield, California); however, it re-aired a Spanish-language newscast and two Spanish-language public affairs programs from KUVS on Sunday mornings to meet Federal Communications Commission (FCC) requirements regarding local programming on Class A television stations.

In 2014, the HSN affiliation was dropped and KEZT began repeating KUVS-DT (KUVI-DT, at the time, a MyNetworkTV affiliate, became Univision's sole remaining English-language station once again). To accommodate these changes, the station added three new subchannels, expanding from one SD channel to four channels (with two HD channels in 5.1 surround sound for Spanish programming and two SD channels for English programming).

== Technical information ==
=== Subchannels ===
Subchannels of KUVS-DT and KEZT-CD
Channel		Res.	Short name	Programming
KUVS-DT	KEZT-CD	Res.	Short name	Programming
19.1	23.1	720p	KUVS-DT	Univision
19.4	23.4	480i	Mystery	Ion Mystery
64.2	23.2	720p	KTFK-HD	UniMás (KTFK-DT)

Simulcast of subchannels of another station

=== Analog-to-digital conversion ===
Since it was a Class A low-power analog station, it stayed on the air well after the June 2009 cutoff, but left the air on January 26, 2012. It was replaced with a digital channel (in standard definition with 2-channel sound) the same day.
