= Swanston station =

Tram stop in Sacramento, California, USA

Swanston
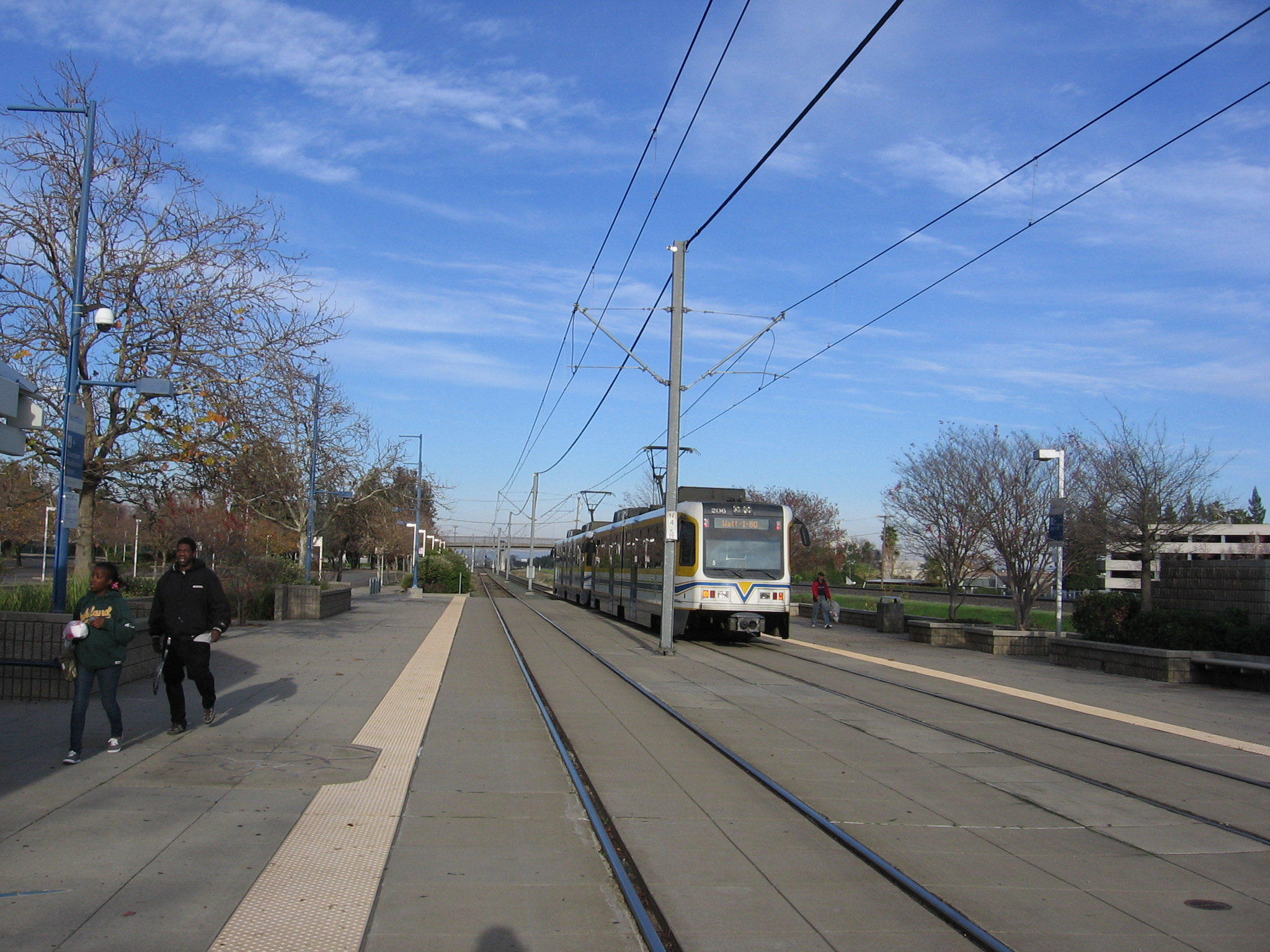
- Swanston station platforms, December 2012

General information
- Location: Arden Way at Calvados Avenue; Sacramento, California; United States
- Coordinates: 38°36′28″N 121°26′22″W
- Owner: Sacramento Regional Transit District
- Platforms: 2 side platforms
- Tracks: 2

Construction
- Structure type: At-grade
- Parking: 311 spaces
- Accessible: Yes

History
- Opened: March 12, 1987

Services
Preceding station	SacRT	Following station
Marconi/Arcade toward Watt/I-80	Blue Line	Royal Oaks toward Cosumnes River College
Location

Swanston station is a side-platformed Sacramento RT light rail station between Arden Way and El Camino Avenue, just west of the Capital City Freeway, in Sacramento, California, United States. The station was opened on March 12, 1987, and is operated by the Sacramento Regional Transit District as part of the Blue Line.

The station is named for the C. Swanston & Son Meat Packing Plant, formerly located in the vicinity of the current station. The current light rail transit route between the Arden / Del Paso and Swanston stations was built on the abandoned right of way of the freight-only branch line of the Sacramento Northern Railway electric interurban that served the slaughterhouse.
