= North Sacramento, Sacramento, California =

City in California, 1924–1964; neighborhood

Coordinates: 38°36′22″N 121°27′27″W

North Sacramento is a community that is part of the city of Sacramento, California, United States. It was a city from its incorporation in 1924 until it was merged (in a bitter election decided by 6 votes) in 1964 into the City of Sacramento. Incorporation was led by the North Sacramento Chamber of Commerce, incorporated the year before, in 1923.

From its time of incorporation in 1924 to its disincorporation in 1964, the city of North Sacramento was distinctive for being the only incorporated city immediately adjacent to Sacramento. Sacramento would go 23 years without an adjacent incorporated city until the incorporation of West Sacramento in Yolo County in 1987.

The primary ZIP code for North Sacramento is 95815.

At the time of its 1964 merger with Sacramento, the boundaries of North Sacramento consisted of the American River on the south, property lines and the Natomas East Drainage Canal (now Steelhead Creek) on the west, Main Avenue on the north, and the Sacramento Northern Railroad (now a bike trail) on the east until its junction with Lampasas Avenue, continuing east and south on Evergreen Street, east on El Camino Avenue (with variations), and southeast on the Southern Pacific (now Union Pacific) railroad line to its crossing of the American River. All of these boundaries were also the boundaries of the surrounding city of Sacramento, except for the communities of Hagginwood and Ben Ali, which were not yet annexed to either city. The merger election with Sacramento was a bitter contest that took two elections and only passed by 6 votes. The NO campaign signs showcased a large fish swallowing a small fish.

The North Sacramento School District, which served a majority of the city, became part of Twin Rivers Unified School District in a 2007 merger. The area also has numerous community and civic organizations with the old city name (the North Sacramento Chamber of Commerce was founded in 1923). The retail life of the community relied substantially upon the road traffic of Del Paso Boulevard and El Camino Avenue (which carried U.S. Route 40 in the pre-freeway days) during its heyday as a separate city. North Sacramento is also the home of Sacramento's central U.S. Postal Service facility. The North Sacramento Freeway was completed in the late 1950s, originally carrying U.S. 40 and renumbered in 1964 as Highway 160 (the portion west of Arden Way). This area is also known as Old North Sacramento.

A significant issue, in the debate over the merger of the City of North Sacramento with the City of Sacramento, was the sale of fresh meat after 6 pm. At the time, there were laws that forbade the sale of fresh meat after 6 pm. In North Sacramento, no such restrictions existed. Women, working in the downtown area of Sacramento and required to work past the time that would allow them to go to Sacramento markets in time to buy meat for their families on the way home in the City of Sacramento, would drive in to North Sacramento to buy fresh meat for the dinner table. This particular bone of contention was not resolved until the City of Sacramento relented, and allowed the sale of meat after 6 pm in North Sacramento, and eventually in Sacramento in general. The result was the absorption of the City of North Sacramento into the City of Sacramento. That final alteration in the law removed a substantial economic basis for shopping in North Sacramento, thus the beginning of its long decline.

After the merger of North Sacramento with the City of Sacramento and 1960s freeway construction that bypassed business districts on Marysville, Rio Linda, and Del Paso Boulevards, North Sacramento began a gradual decline. The tax base lessened and local representation in city government has historically been lacking. For the next fifty five years, city funding would be provided to maintain popular old neighborhoods in the downtown and mid-town areas and to build infrastructure in emerging new communities, while North Sacramento was relegated to a position of forgotten status. Also, because of the diverse population and large area covered, North Sacramento has suffered from an identity crisis. Recently, awareness and community action have increased and the new motto of the community is "North Sac is Back"!

== Neighborhoods ==
=== Del Paso Heights ===
Del Paso Heights (also known colloquially as "The Heights") is a neighborhood located in North Sacramento. Its boundaries are North Avenue, South Avenue, Grand Avenue, and Marysville Boulevard. West Del Paso Heights is located along Norwood Avenue. Del Paso Heights is home to Michael J. Castori Elementary School and Grant Union High School.

=== Strawberry Manor/Fairbanks ===
The Strawberry Manor/Fairbanks neighborhood is a neighborhood situated within North Sacramento. There are only four ways in and out of the neighborhood. The boundaries are: Silver Eagle Road to the north, Arcade Creek to the south, Norwood Avenue to the east, and Steelhead Creek to the west. Strawberry Manor is an old rural area historically known for African-American small farmers, sharecroppers, and farm workers. In the 1960s and 1970s, modest single family homes were built on land known to regularly flood, and this housing became inhabited mainly by low-income persons of color. The neighborhood suffered extensive damage in the 1986 floods.

=== Woodlake ===
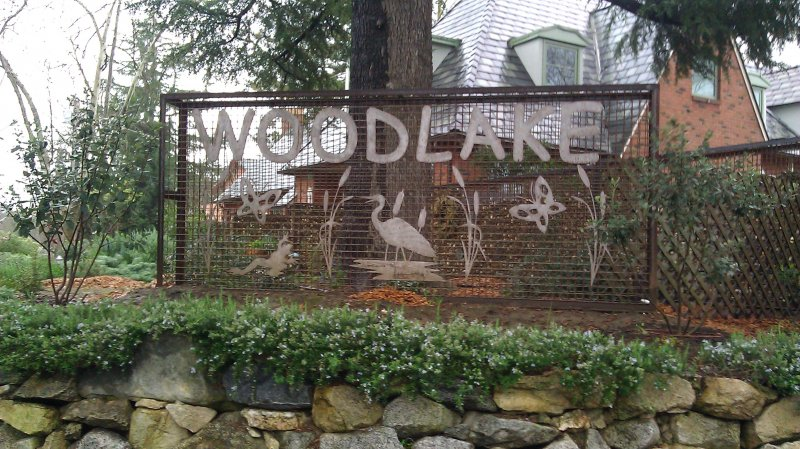

Woodlake is a stately 1930s and 1940s neighborhood situated within North Sacramento. The boundaries of Woodlake are: Arden Way to the north, North Sacramento Freeway (Highway 160) to the south, Royal Oaks Drive to the east and Del Paso Boulevard (Uptown Art District) to the west. Woodlake is a neighborhood of mostly older homes with great character and value.

This neighborhood is mostly inhabited by career professionals; it is often cited in Sacramento publications as one of Sacramento's most desired neighborhoods. Like parts of East Sacramento and Land Park, the neighborhood employs private security. Several prominent Sacramentans live in Woodlake, including former state assemblyman and county supervisor Roger Dickinson, former City Councilman Rob Kerth, business leader Terry Sidie, and the Slobe family.

Woodlake is home to the Woodlake Swim Club, and Iceland, a seasonal ice skating rink. The headquarters of Sacramento News & Review, Sacramento's alternative newspaper, is in Woodlake.

=== Noralto ===
Noralto is a neighborhood situated within North Sacramento. The boundaries of Noralto are Las Palmas Avenue to the north, Altos Avenue to the south, Sacramento Northern Bicycle Parkway to the east, and Steelhead Creek to the west. Homes in this area range from the late 1930s to the 1980s. It is home to the Altos Ave Community flower garden along the Sacramento North Bicycle Parkway.

=== Richardson Village ===
Richardson Village is a neighborhood situated within North Sacramento. The boundaries of Richardson Village are Arcade Creek to the north, Las Palmas Avenue to the south, Norwood Avenue to the west, and Rio Linda Boulevard to the east. Homes in this area were originally built in the 1950s. Many examples of California ranch architecture still remain. This one-time middle-class neighborhood has seen an increase in working poor residents over the past forty years, and has endured rising crime rates and decreased property values as rental units and city neglect have increased.

=== South Hagginwood ===
South Hagginwood is a neighborhood situated within North Sacramento. It is an established neighborhood with older homes with great character, mature oak trees, and oversized private lots. It is informally known as one of the city's hidden gems. European Americans and African Americans usually populate this neighborhood. Elevated crime and lower property values still affect this area. The boundaries of South Hagginwood are: Arcade Creek to the north, Eleanor Avenue to the south, Sacramento Northern bike trail to the west, and Del Paso Boulevard/Arcade Boulevard-Marconi Avenue to the east. This neighborhood is near the Marconi/Arcade RT light rail station, and the Regional Transit Light Rail Metro Headquarters.

=== Swanston Estates ===
Swanston Estates is a neighborhood situated in North Sacramento. The boundaries of Swanston Estates are El Camino Avenue to the north, Arden Way to the south, Ethan Way to the east, and Business 80 to the west. This small neighborhood was built in the mid-1950s and was the first suburban housing tract built in the area, although older neighborhoods had developed previously in Woodlake and along the Rancho Del Paso arcade (now Marysville, Del Paso, and Arcade Boulevards). The neighborhood is named after C.S. Swanston & Son, original owners of a large livestock industry that operated on the land. The Swanston Ranch area included a dairy, cattle ranch, and meat packing plant situated next to the railroad tracks near Arden Way. Sheep grazed on the land now belonging to Cal Expo. The Sears, Roebuck & Co. acquired a portion of the land along Arden Way in the early 1950s and for many years was the main store in the area that would eventually become Arden Fair Mall (Sears eventually shuttered its store in 2021). Swanston Estates is a very diverse neighborhood with a rich history. Founding residents Nicholas and Henrietta Gosselink established the Hope Community Church on Ethan Way. The population continues to include several original residents including Gay Babcock, whose uncle contributed the land for D.W. Babcock Elementary School and park. Linda Fowler, Twin Rivers Unified School District Board of Education Trustee resides in the neighborhood, as well as several small business owners and other professionals. D.W. Babcock Elementary School has many successful alumni, including NFL star Donté Stallworth. The neighborhood also has many rentals and historically has provided some of the city's most affordable housing, leading to a diverse working-class population.

=== Dixieanne ===
Dixieanne is a neighborhood situated in North Sacramento. Its boundaries are El Camino Avenue to the north, Arden Way to the south, Evergreen Street to the east, and Del Paso Boulevard to the North/West. This neighborhood is home to the recently renovated Dixieanne Park, which includes, a new skate park. A unique neighborhood with hidden charm, due to the fact, that it is very close to the original Del Paso Boulevard; which was completely revamped from four to two lanes, with parallel parking transitioning to diagonal parking. The boulevard is full of Art Deco architecture, and is classified by the city as a redevelopment area. This neighborhood is walking distance to the Arden/Del Paso RT light rail station and adjacent bus stops. There are many fast food chains and mom and pop shops on this boulevard and nearby El Camino Avenue.

=== Wills Acres ===
Wills Acres is a neighborhood situated in North Sacramento. Its boundaries are Arcade Creek to the north, Eleanor Avenue to the south, Steelhead Creek to the west, and Norwood Avenue to the east. Johnston Park is located in Wills Acres and this park features a community center and swimming pool.
