= Foothill, California =

Foothill, California may refer to:

- Foothill, Los Angeles County, California
- Foothill, Placer County, California
- Foothill Farms, California
- Foothill Ranch, Lake Forest, California
