= KUVS-DT =

Television station in Modesto, California

- Modesto–Sacramento–Stockton, California; United States
- City: Modesto, California
- Channels: Digital: 18 (UHF); Virtual: 19
- Branding: Univision 19; Noticias N+ Univision 19 (newscasts)

Programming
- Affiliations: 19.1: Univision; 19.2: UniMás; for others, see § Subchannels

Ownership
- Owner: TelevisaUnivision; (KUVS License Partnership, GP)
- Sister stations: KTFK-DT, KEZT-CD

History
- First air date: August 26, 1966
- Former call signs: KLOC-TV (1966–1981); KCSO (1981–1997); KUVS (1997–2003); KUVS-TV (2004–2009)
- Former channel numbers: Analog: 19 (UHF, 1966–2009)
- Former affiliations: Independent (1966–1972)
- Call sign meaning: "Univision Sacramento"

Technical information
- Licensing authority: FCC
- Facility ID: 58609
- ERP: 500 kW
- HAAT: 555 m (1,821 ft)
- Transmitter coordinates: 38°7′7″N 120°43′31″W
- Translator(s): KEZT-CD 23 Sacramento; KTFK-DT 64.2 Stockton

Links
- Public license information: Public file; LMS
- Website: www.univision.com/local/sacramento-kuvs

KUVS-DT (channel 19) is a television station licensed to Modesto, California, United States, broadcasting the Spanish-language Univision network to the Sacramento area. It is owned and operated by TelevisaUnivision alongside Stockton-licensed UniMás outlet KTFK-DT (channel 64). The two stations share studios on Arden Way near Cal Expo in Sacramento; KUVS-DT's transmitter is located near Valley Springs, California.

Channel 19 in Modesto was founded by country and western performer Chester Smith and began broadcasting as KLOC-TV on August 26, 1966. It was an English-language independent station but struggled to obtain programming once distributors raised their rate. As a result, the station simulcast co-owned KLOC radio during the day and began airing Spanish-language shows at night. By the 1970s, it was specializing in daytime Christian programming and evening Spanish-language programming. Its coverage area expanded to include Sacramento in 1975; the call sign changed to KCSO-TV in 1981 when Smith sold KLOC radio. Over the course of the 1980s, Smith built several additional television stations in central California and Nevada broadcasting Spanish-language programming.

Chester Smith sold KCSO to Univision in 1997; Smith retained the call sign, so the station was renamed KUVS-TV. The station moved most of its operations from Modesto to Sacramento after the sale. It produces local Spanish-language newscasts for the market as well as a weekly public affairs program seen on other Univision stations in California.

All of KUVS-DT's subchannels are rebroadcast in the immediate Sacramento area on KEZT-CD (channel 23), and KTFK-DT also rebroadcasts the Univision subchannel of KUVS-DT to provide improved coverage.

== History ==
=== Chester Smith ownership ===
On March 3, 1964, Corbett Pierce and country and western performer Chester Smith, owner of KLOC (920 AM) in Ceres, applied to the Federal Communications Commission (FCC) for permission to build a new television station on channel 17 in Modesto, one of two channels allocated to the city. The FCC approved the application on November 12, 1964; after a national overhaul of ultra high frequency (UHF) channel allocations finalized in early 1966 shifted Modesto's channel allocation to channel 19, the station began broadcasting as independent station KLOC-TV on August 26, 1966.

Initially, KLOC maintained a general-entertainment format and was one of the stations that carried programming from the United Network during its one month of operation in May 1967. About a year after its sign-on, the syndicators providing KLOC's programming raised their prices to the levels closer to a Sacramento-licensed station (the station's owners had been acquiring programming at lower rates closer to that of an unrated television market); KLOC-TV alleged that Stockton's KOVR had pressured syndicators not to do business with the Modesto station. Smith resorted to simulcasting KLOC radio's programming during the daytime hours, including a camera in the radio station's studios showing the disc jockeys live, and ran Spanish-language telenovelas in the evening, when the radio station signed off. Advertising revenue from the radio station helped keep channel 19 afloat. In 1972, the station joined the Spanish International Network (SIN), predecessor to Univision; soon after came an affiliation with the Christian Broadcasting Network (CBN) to air religious programs. SIN and CBN provided steady income and turned the struggling station's fortunes around.

In 1975, the station increased its power and finally began broadcasting in color; the technical improvements also resulted in Sacramento being able to receive the station for the first time. Smith sought to expand the reach of his station's programming. In 1976, he proposed to build a satellite station on channel 42 in Concord, which had lay fallow for a decade following the short-lived existence of KCFT-TV a decade prior, with a transmitter to be built atop Mount Diablo. The move was roundly opposed by citizens' groups that felt that Concord's channel 42 would be better used by a station that proposed more local programming. Two television stations that broadcast Spanish-language programming, KEMO-TV (channel 20) in San Francisco and KMUV-TV (channel 31) in Sacramento, also objected. As a result, KLOC abandoned the Concord proposal in December 1976. In 1979, KLOC won the rights to build channel 35 in Salinas, to repeat much of its Modesto programming to the Monterey Bay area; as a result, the KLOC radio station was sold off as a condition of obtaining the construction permit, and the television station changed its call sign to KCSO ("Chester Smith Organization") in 1981. KCBA started broadcasting on November 1, 1981, becoming an English-language independent station several years later. In 1986, KREN-TV went on the air as an SIN-affiliated sister station in Reno, Nevada. Later in the decade, K07TA and K09UF, predecessors to today's KTAS (channel 33), went on air in the Santa Barbara and San Luis Obispo area, and in 1991, plans were revealed for further stations in Merced and Eureka.

KCSO's primary local program was its 6 p.m. local newscast, which was produced on a "dental floss budget", in the words of Xóchitl Arellano, who worked at the station when it was still located in Modesto. However, the number of news personnel slowly increased throughout the 1990s.

=== Univision ownership ===
In late 1996, Smith announced the sale of KCSO to Univision for $40 million (equivalent to $73.6 million in 2025 dollars); once the sale closed, the station's morning Christian programs would be discontinued to make way for broadcasting all of Univision's Spanish-language output. (The KCSO call letters were retained by Smith, who started KCSO-LP, a Telemundo affiliate, in 1999.) Smith was paid in Univision stock, which quadrupled in value between 1997 and 1999.

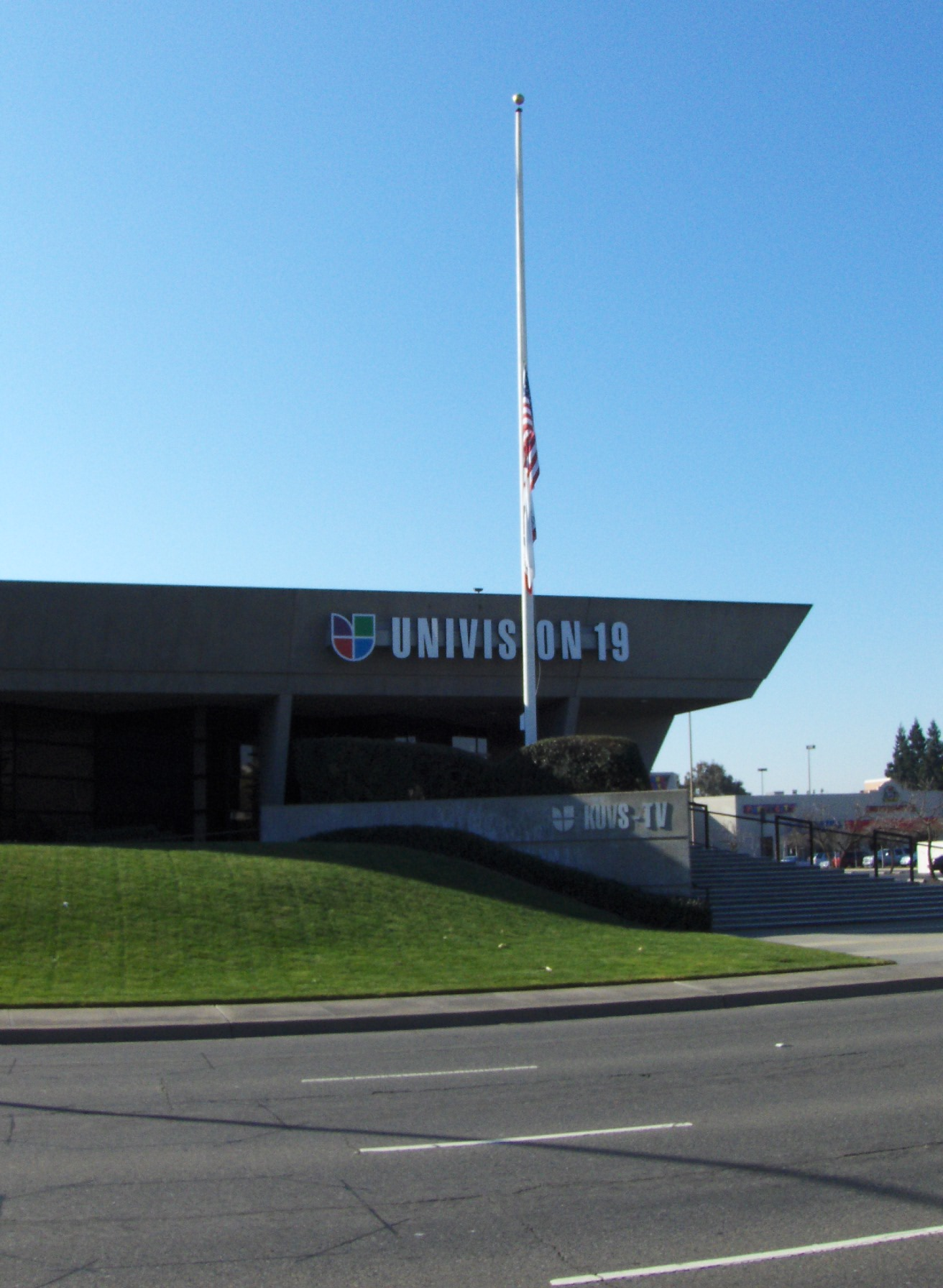
KUVS has broadcast from this Sacramento building since 1998

Univision changed the call letters to KUVS, relocated operations from Modesto to Sacramento, and added an 11 p.m. local newscast to the station's longstanding 6 p.m. local news, which also began to cover news in Sacramento. It was the first time a network had placed an owned-and-operated TV station in Sacramento. Univision purchased a former bank building across from the Arden Fair Mall to house its Sacramento operation, leaving only sales and news personnel in Modesto.

== Newscasts and other local programming ==
The KUVS newsroom in Sacramento airs half-hour local early and late evening newscasts seven days a week and A Primera Hora ("First Thing in the Morning"), a one-hour-long morning newscast at 6 a.m. In 2017, Univision debuted a statewide Edición Digital (Digital Edition) newscast, aired at 12:30 p.m. The station began producing local newscasts in the early 1970s, though the station's resources were limited. The news set consisted of a table and chairs until anchor Xóchitl Arellano persuaded San Francisco's KGO-TV to sell its previous news set to KCSO for $2,000.

KUVS also produces Voz y Voto, a weekly political roundtable program distributed to Univision's California stations. When it debuted in 1999, the program was co-produced with KMEX-TV in Los Angeles and was originally hosted by Rosa Maria Villalpando; Armando Botello, state political columnist for Los Angeles newspaper La Opinión; and Arellano, among others. In 2005, the program featured an exclusive interview with governor Arnold Schwarzenegger. Arellano continued to serve as one of the program's anchors until she left the station in 2007.

== Technical information ==
=== Subchannels ===
KUVS-DT's transmitter is located near Valley Springs, California.

Subchannels of KUVS-DT and KEZT-CD
Subchannel		Res.	Short name	Programming
KUVS-DT	KEZT-CD	Res.	Short name	Programming
19.1	23.1	720p	KUVS-DT	Univision
19.2	23.2	720p	KTFK-HD	UniMás (KTFK-DT)
19.4	23.4	480i	Mystery	Ion Mystery

Simulcast of subchannels of another station

KEZT-CD broadcasts the subchannels on this multiplex using major channel 23.

KUVS-DT is part of Sacramento's ATSC 3.0 (NextGen TV) deployment on KQCA, which began operating in July 2021.

=== Analog-to-digital conversion ===
KUVS-TV shut down its analog signal, over UHF channel 19, on June 12, 2009, as part of the federally mandated transition from analog to digital television. The station's digital signal remained on its pre-transition UHF channel 18.
