= KTFK-DT =

Television station in Stockton, California

- Stockton–Sacramento–Modesto, California; United States
- City: Stockton, California
- Channels: Digital: 26 (UHF); Virtual: 64
- Branding: UniMás 64

Programming
- Affiliations: 64.1: UniMás; 64.2: Univision; for others, see § Subchannels

Ownership
- Owner: TelevisaUnivision; (UniMas Sacramento LLC)
- Sister stations: KUVS-DT, KEZT-CD

History
- First air date: November 12, 1987
- Former call signs: KFTL (1987–2004); KTFK-TV (2004–2009)
- Former channel numbers: Analog: 64 (UHF, 1987–2009); Digital: 62 (UHF, until 2009)
- Former affiliations: Independent (1987–2004)
- Call sign meaning: Telefutura

Technical information
- Licensing authority: FCC
- Facility ID: 20871
- ERP: 850 kW
- HAAT: 595 m (1,952 ft)
- Transmitter coordinates: 38°14′24″N 121°30′7″W
- Translator(s): KUVS-DT 19.2 Modesto; KEZT-CD 23.2 (UHF) Sacramento

Links
- Public license information: Public file; LMS
- Website: UniMás

KTFK-DT (channel 64) is a television station licensed to Stockton, California, United States, broadcasting the Spanish-language UniMás network to the Sacramento area. It is owned and operated by TelevisaUnivision alongside Modesto-licensed Univision outlet KUVS-DT, channel 19 (and its Sacramento-based translator KEZT-CD, channel 23). The two stations share studios on Arden Way near Cal Expo in Sacramento; KTFK's transmitter is located near Walnut Grove, California.

== History ==
The station first signed on the air on November 12, 1987, as KFTL, operating as an independent station; it was founded and owned by Family Radio, a non-profit organization headed by Harold Camping that ran traditional non-commercial Christian radio stations and over the years taught conservative Calvinistic reformed Christian theology.

Because of the lack of available programming from the syndication market that complies with Family Radio's programming philosophy, KFTL instead ran religious programming about six hours a day, with programming from the Home Shopping Network filling the remainder of the schedule.

In the late 1990s, it began running a few hours of public domain movies and sitcoms each day. Family Radio never grew into television as planned; as a result, the organization sold KFTL in 2003 to Univision Communications, which turned it into a Spanish-language station as an owned-and-operated station of Telefutura (which was relaunched as UniMás in January 2013). The station also modified its call letters to KTFK. As a result, KTFK became the fourth station in the Sacramento market overall to be owned and operated by its affiliated network.

Family Radio later bought a San Francisco low-power station, K30BI, which now carries the call letters KCNZ-CD. Initially, KCNZ-CD was reprogrammed and carried similar programming to that which aired on the former KFTL.

== Technical information ==
=== Subchannels ===
The station's signal is multiplexed:

Subchannels of KTFK-DT
| Subchannel | Res. | Short name | Programming |
|---|---|---|---|
| 64.1 | 720p | KTFK-DT | UniMás |
| 64.2 | 720p | KUVS-HD | Univision (KUVS-DT) |
| 64.3 | 480i | GREAT | Great (4:3) |
| 64.4 | 480i | GRIT | Grit |
| 64.5 | 480i | ShopLC | Shop LC |
| 64.6 | 480i | BT2 | Infomercials |
| 64.7 | 480i | MVSGLD | MovieSphere Gold |
| 58.3 | 480i | Estrela | Estrella TV (KQCA) |

Simulcast of subchannels of another station
Subchannel broadcast with MPEG-4 video
Broadcast on behalf of another station

There is no 64.2 on this multiplex, as it is broadcast from KUVS-DT.

=== Analog-to-digital conversion ===
KTFK-TV ended transmission of analog television over UHF channel 64 on May 8, 2009, due to equipment failure, and informed the FCC there was insufficient time before the June 12 shutoff to do repairs. Despite losing its analog transmitter, KTFK continued digital broadcasting on its transitional digital channel 62, until the June 12 cutoff. On June 13, 2009, it began broadcasting on its permanent DTV channel, UHF channel 26.

As part of the analog-to-digital transition, KTFK-TV moved its broadcast location from an antenna on Mount Diablo, which it shared with KTNC-TV, to an antenna on the KXTV/KOVR candelabra in Walnut Grove. This move was necessary because transmissions from Mount Diablo can be received in both the San Francisco and Sacramento markets, and there were no channels remaining for KTFK to use that would be free of interference in both markets. Moving broadcasting to Walnut Grove prevented potential interference with San Francisco Bay Area stations.
