= Arden Way (Sacramento, California) =

Street in California, United States

- Interactive map of Arden Way
- Maintained by: the City of Sacramento Department of Transportation and the County of Sacramento Department of Transportation (SACDOT)
- Location: Sacramento County, California, United States
- West end: Acoma Street in Sacramento
- Major junctions: I-80 BL / SR 160 in Sacramento; Watt Avenue near Sacramento
- East end: American River Parkway in Carmichael

Arden Way is a major east-west arterial in Sacramento County, California, United States. It is approximately 8 miles (13 km) long and runs through Sacramento and the unincorporated suburbs of Arden-Arcade and Carmichael.

== Route description ==
=== Sacramento ===
Arden Way begins at Acoma Street in the North Sacramento area of Sacramento. It is a side street in a light industrial area, running approximately two blocks up to Colfax Street (the portion between Colfax and Barstow Street is a one-way street westbound) and paralleling the Arden-Garden Connector, the westward continuation for major thoroughfare traffic on Arden Way east of Colfax Street, connecting with Garden Highway, hence the name of the connector. After Colfax Street, Arden Way gains its major thoroughfare status as a four-lane roadway, intersecting Del Paso Boulevard (old US 40) and running parallel with the Sacramento Regional Transit District's Blue Line light rail tracks and a residential frontage street of Arden Way up until Royal Oaks Drive. It passes two light rail stations: The Arden/Del Paso station and the Royal Oaks station. Arden Way then travels over the light rail and Union Pacific railroad tracks at a large overpass, where the roadway turns southeast towards the interchange of Business 80 (also known as the Capital City Freeway) and Highway 160, known locally as the Arden Y. Arden Way widens to about 6-7 lanes as it passes Arden Fair Mall, then intersects Exposition Boulevard and Ethan Way, where the roadway turns east, leaving the city of Sacramento and into the unincorporated community of Arden-Arcade.

The unusually large overpass between Evergreen and Harvard Streets was to have been part of the I-80 freeway replacement of what is now the Capital City Freeway (or Business 80). Caltrans abandoned the project in the early 1980s and was turned over to Regional Transit for their light rail system.

=== Arden-Arcade ===
After leaving Sacramento, Arden Way immediately intersects Howe Avenue, another major thoroughfare running north-south. After Howe Avenue, the roadway narrows back down to four lanes. It continues east to intersect with other north-south major thoroughfares, including Fulton Avenue, Watt Avenue and Eastern Avenue. As Arden Way meets up with Mission Avenue, it enters the unincorporated community of Carmichael.

=== Carmichael ===
After Mission Avenue, Arden Way continues east to Fair Oaks Boulevard, where the roadway then downgrades to a two-lane neighborhood street and turns southeast towards its eastern terminus at the American River Parkway.

It was at this terminus (38.589168°N 121.329575°W) that a bridge was planned to cross the American River and connect to Rod Beaudry Drive in Rancho Cordova, but it was never built and the two roads remain unconnected. A pedestrian/bicycle bridge (the Harold Richey Memorial Bridge) crosses the American River at that point, but barricades prevent regular automobile traffic.

== Landmarks and points of interest ==
- Arden Fair - An enclosed regional shopping center with 165 shops and anchored by two department stores.
- Univision 19 / UniMás 64 TV Studios - Television studios for local Univision owned-and-operated station KUVS-DT (channel 19) and UniMás owned-and-operated station KTFK-DT (channel 64).
- St. Ignatius Loyola Parish - A historic local church and private school.

== Major cities ==
- Sacramento, California

== Local transportation ==
RT buses 13, 19, 23, 84, 113, and 129 operate on Arden Way. RT light rail stations Arden/Del Paso, Royal Oaks and nearby Swanston serve Arden Way.

== Major intersections ==
The entire route is in Sacramento County.

Location	mi	km	Destinations	Notes
Sacramento	0	0.0	Arden-Garden Connector	Continuation beyond Colfax Street; west end of Arden Way is at Acoma Street
Sacramento	0	0.0	Colfax Street	
Sacramento	0.3	0.48	Del Paso Boulevard, Grove Avenue, Canterbury Road	Former US 40
Sacramento	0.9	1.4	Royal Oaks Drive, Beaumont Street	To SR 160 south and Exposition Boulevard east
Sacramento	1.6	2.6	I-80 BL (Capital City Freeway) / SR 160 south (North Sacramento Freeway) – Reno, San Francisco, Downtown Sacramento	Interchange; former US 40 / US 99E / I-80; I-80 BL east exit 9B, west exit 10A; SR 160 north exit 48
Sacramento	2.1	3.4	Heritage Lane – Cal Expo	
Sacramento	2.3	3.7	Challenge Way	
Sacramento	2.5	4.0	Alta Arden Expressway	No right turn from Arden Way west to Alta Arden Expressway east
Sacramento–Arden-Arcade line	2.6	4.2	Exposition Boulevard, Ethan Way	No left turn from Arden Way west to Ethan Way south
Arden-Arcade	2.9	4.7	Howe Avenue	
Arden-Arcade	3.6	5.8	Fulton Avenue	
Arden-Arcade	4.6	7.4	Watt Avenue	
Arden-Arcade	5.6	9.0	Eastern Avenue	
Arden-Arcade–Carmichael line	6.1	9.8	Mission Avenue	
Carmichael	6.6	10.6	Fair Oaks Boulevard	
American River Parkway	7.3	11.7	William B. Pond Recreation Area Entrance	
American River Parkway	8.0	12.9	Jedediah Smith Memorial Trail	East end of Arden Way
1.000 mi = 1.609 km; 1.000 km = 0.621 mi: Incomplete access
