= Watt/I-80 West station =

Light rail station in North Highlands, California

Watt/I-80 West
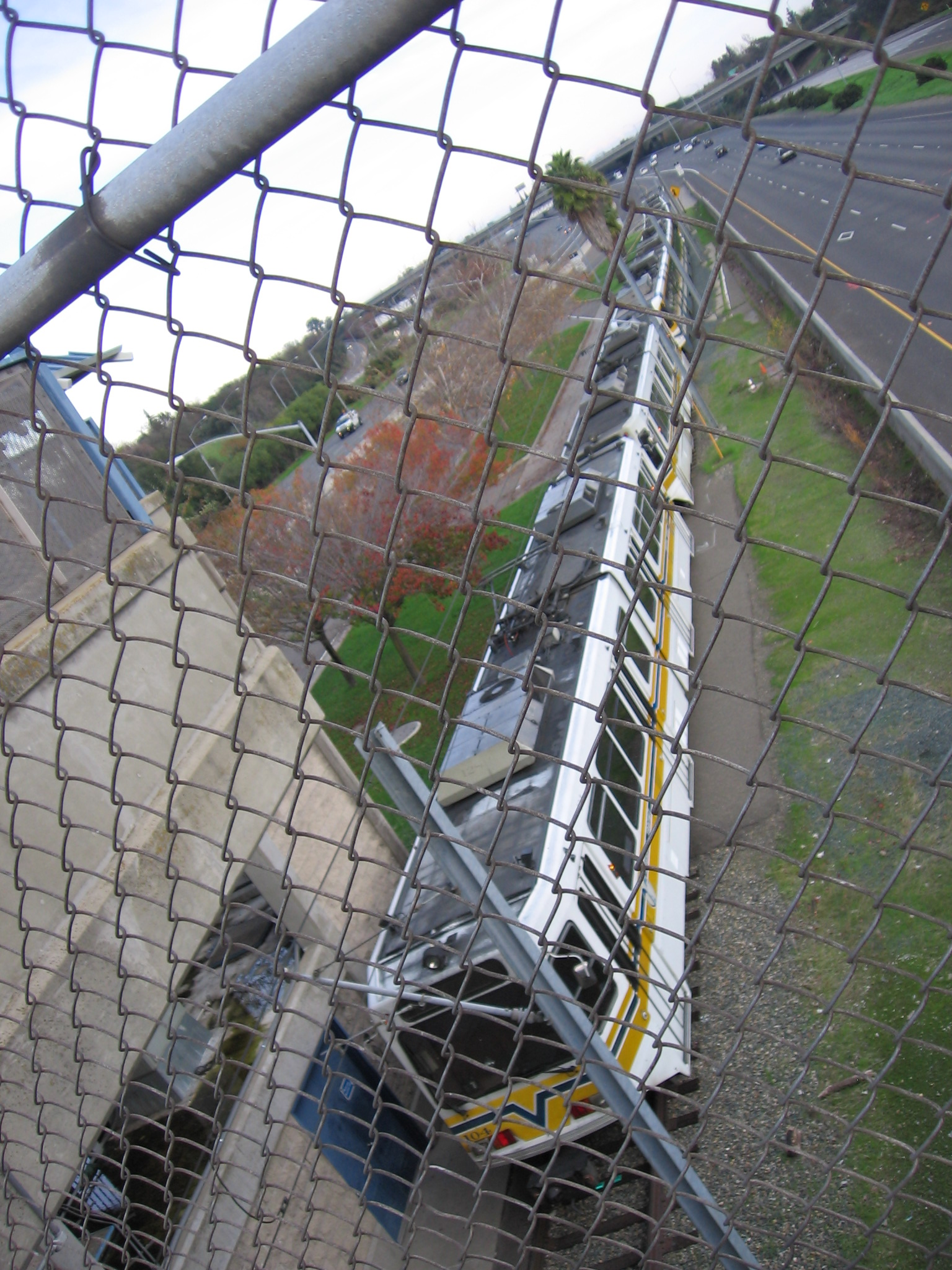

General information
- Location: Interstate 80; North Highlands, California; United States
- Coordinates: 38°38′34″N 121°23′40″W
- Owner: Sacramento Regional Transit District
- Platforms: 1 side platform
- Tracks: 1

Construction
- Structure type: Freeway median, at-grade
- Parking: 248 spaces
- Accessible: Yes

History
- Opened: March 12, 1987

Services
Preceding station	SacRT	Following station
Watt/I-80 Terminus	Blue Line	Roseville Road toward Cosumnes River College
Location

Watt/I-80 West station is an at-grade light rail station on the Blue Line of the SacRT light rail system operated by the Sacramento Regional Transit District. The station is located in the median of Interstate 80 west of its intersection of Watt Avenue, after which the station is named, in the community of North Highlands, California, United States.

The station along with a 248 space park and ride lot, reused a partially built, but later abandoned freeway project.
