= Roseville Road station =

Light rail station in North Highlands, California

Roseville Road
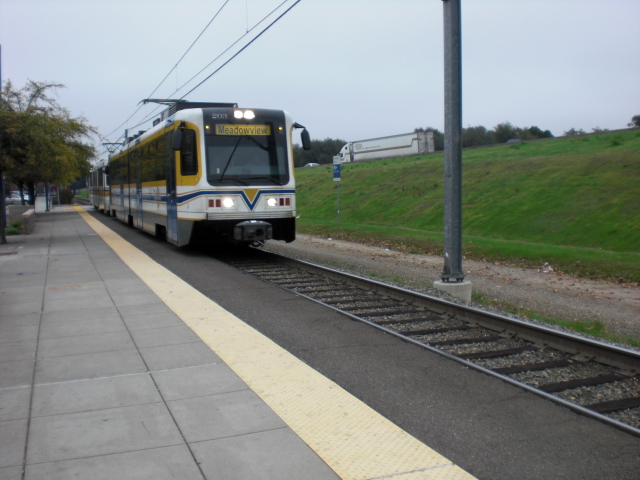
- A train at Roseville Road station

General information
- Location: Interstate 80 at Roseville Road; Sacramento, California; United States
- Coordinates: 38°38′17″N 121°24′8″W
- Owner: Sacramento Regional Transit District
- Platforms: 1 side platform
- Tracks: 1

Construction
- Structure type: Freeway median, at-grade
- Parking: 1,087 spaces
- Accessible: Yes

History
- Opened: March 12, 1987

Services
| Preceding station | SacRT | Following station |
|---|---|---|
| Watt/I-80 West toward Watt/I-80 | Blue Line | Marconi/Arcade toward Cosumnes River College |
Location

Roseville Road station is an at-grade light rail station on the Blue Line of the SacRT light rail system operated by the Sacramento Regional Transit District. The station is located in the median of Interstate 80 at its intersection with Roseville Road, after which the station is named, in the city of Sacramento, California, United States, close to the southern edge of the community of North Highlands.

The station, along with a 1,087 space park and ride lot, reused a partially built, but later abandoned freeway project.

Many commuters who drive to light rail, even those who live closer to the Watt/I-80 stations, use the Roseville Road station since it has a large, reasonably well-patrolled parking lot, and is easier to reach by car.

The station has no functional pedestrian access, with a 2018 report finding "no sidewalks within a half mile of the platform."

Roseville Road station sits at the eastern end of the intended westbound overpass from the abandoned I-80 project and since the station's opening in 1987, the overpass was used as a two-way vehicular connection from the station to Winters Street via a hairpin turn at the western end of the overpass, but as of 2025, Jersey barriers were put in place at the end of Winters Street and the east end of the overpass, blocking access. Access to the station at Roseville Road itself and the westbound offramp of the Longview Drive interchange (exit 93) from I-80 remain.
