= California State Route 244 =

Highway in California

State Route 244
- SR 244 highlighted in red

Route information
- Maintained by Caltrans
- Length: 1.08 mi (1.74 km)
- Existed: July 1, 1964–present

Major junctions
- West end: I-80 / I-80 BL in North Highlands
- East end: Auburn Boulevard in Sacramento

Location
- Country: United States
- State: California
- Counties: Sacramento

Highway system
- State highways in California; Interstate; US; State; Scenic; History; Pre‑1964; Unconstructed; Deleted; Freeways
← SR 243	→ SR 245

State Route 244 (SR 244) is a state highway in the U.S. state of California located northeast of Sacramento. It serves as a short freeway connection between the Interstate 80/Interstate 80 Business junction and Auburn Boulevard (the old Lincoln Highway - former U.S. Route 40/U.S. Route 99E). SR 244 was first added to the state highway system in 1959 as Legislative Route 288, and was renumbered as SR 244 in the 1964 renumbering. Portions of this route have been removed from the system as recently as 1994.

== Route description ==
Route 244 is defined in section 544 of the California Streets and Highways Code, and that the highway is "from Route 80 to Auburn Boulevard in Carmichael".

SR 244 starts just east of the westernmost ramps to the Watt Avenue exit off I-80. East of this, there are several connector ramps to both I-80 and Business I-80 as SR 244 passes under the terminus of Business I-80. SR 244 terminates at Auburn Boulevard, having just entered the Sacramento city limits near Renfree Park. The highway is only signed at the exit gore from eastbound Interstate 80 Business.

SR 244 is part of the National Highway System, a network of highways that are considered essential to the country's economy, defense, and mobility by the Federal Highway Administration.

== History ==
Legislative Route 288 was defined in 1959 as a proposed route from pre-1964 Legislative Route 3 and pre-1964 Legislative Route 242 (now I-80 and SR 51) northeast of Sacramento east to pre-1964 Legislative Route 249 (unbuilt State Route 65 - approximately Sunrise Boulevard) near Fair Oaks. In the 1964 renumbering, this was assigned the number Route 244.

In 1965, an extension was defined from SR 65 east to U.S. Route 50. In 1972 a series of "volatile" public hearings took place where local residents protested the construction of this route among others being proposed in the Sacramento area. The project was expected to cost $40 million to construct and the resulting freeway would be eight lanes wide. This extension to U.S. Route 50 was removed in 1975, and the route's definition was truncated to end at Fair Oaks Boulevard near San Juan Avenue. The public forums ended in mid-1976 after the Board of Supervisors abandoned plans for all three routes. It was truncated further to Auburn Boulevard, its present terminus, in 1994.

The bridges along the route date from 1971, a year after the bridges on I-80 to the west; that part of I-80 was Interstate 880 until 1981.

== Exit list ==
Except where prefixed with a letter, postmiles were measured on the road as it was in 1964, based on the alignment that existed at the time, and do not necessarily reflect current mileage. R reflects a realignment in the route since then, M indicates a second realignment, L refers to an overlap due to a correction or change, and T indicates postmiles classified as temporary. Segments that remain unconstructed or have been relinquished to local control may be omitted. The entire route is in Sacramento County.

Location	Postmile	Exit	Destinations	Notes
North Highlands	0.00		I-80 west – San Francisco	Westbound left exit and eastbound entrance; west end of SR 244; former I-880 west; I-80 east exit 94B
North Highlands	0.01	1A	Watt Avenue	Westbound exit and eastbound entrance
North Highlands	0.46		I-80 east / I-80 BL west (Capital City Freeway) – Reno, Sacramento	Westbound exit and eastbound entrance; I-80 BL west is former US 40 west / US 99E south / I-80 west; I-80 east is former US 40 east / US 99E north; access from I-80 westbound via exit 95; I‑80 BL east exit 14C, west exit 14A
Sacramento	T1.08		Auburn Boulevard	At-grade intersection; east end of SR 244; former US 40 / US 99E (prior to relocating on freeway alignment that is now I-80 and I-80 BL)
1.000 mi = 1.609 km; 1.000 km = 0.621 mi
