= Ben Ali, Sacramento, California =

Coordinates: 38°37′19″N 121°25′21″W

Ben Ali is a neighborhood located within the city of Sacramento, California, United States. According to The Ben Ali Community Association, the boundaries of the neighborhood are:

- North - Marconi Avenue.
- South - El Camino Avenue.
- East - Capital City Freeway.
- West - Auburn Boulevard.

The Ben Ali community was named for James Ben Ali Haggin who owned much of the ranch later subdivided into these streets as well as adjacent neighborhoods.
