= Sacramento Youth Symphony =

Orchestras in Sacramento, California, U.S.

- Youth orchestra
- Short name: SYS
- Founded: 1956
- Location: Sacramento, California, U.S.
- Music director: Michael Neumann
- Website: www.sacramentoyouthsymphony.org

The Sacramento Youth Symphony (SYS) was founded in 1956 as a 55-member youth orchestra, associated with the Sacramento Symphony Association. The Sacramento Symphony has since ceased operations and the Sacramento Youth Symphony became incorporated as an independent, 501(c)(3) nonprofit organization in 1991. The SYS has evolved from one orchestra to having beginning, intermediate, and advanced orchestras.

The loss of the Sacramento Symphony along with cutbacks and elimination of music programs in the public schools have challenged the SYS to assume a greater role in the music education of youth. The Academy of Music was added in 1995. The Academic Orchestra, an intermediate orchestra, was established in 1996. In 1997, the Classic Orchestra, formerly the Junior Music Sponsors, joined SYS as a beginning-level orchestra. The Vivace strings class was added in 2003 to meet the musical needs of musicians not yet ready for placement in an orchestra. There is also the Premier Orchestra, an orchestra for advanced musicians conducted by Michael Neumann.

In 2005, a flute choir was added, which was split in 2007 into intermediate and advanced ensembles. Clarinet ensembles were added in 2010. The 2010 season included over 350 members in the organization.

In 2011, a strings group called Prelude Strings was added to give young string students who have only been playing for 1–2 years an opportunity to perform in an ensemble.

The Sacramento Youth Symphony has been under the direction of Michael Neumann since 1979.

== Tours ==
- 2015: Costa Rica
- 2010: Vienna, Salzburg, and Prague
- 2007: Gulf of Finland tour – Finland, Estonia, and Russia
- 2003: Brazil
- 1999: European Tour – Switzerland, Austria, Italy, and Germany
- 1995: Vienna – SYS won First Place and the City of Vienna Award at the International Youth and Music Festival in Vienna, Austria.
- 1987: China – performed in Jinan, Beijing, Nanjing, Shanghai, and Hong Kong. Jinan was inspired to start its own youth orchestra, which still operates today.
- 1984: Vienna – SYS placed second in the 13th International Youth and Music Festival in Vienna, Austria.
