= Royal Oaks station =

Royal Oaks
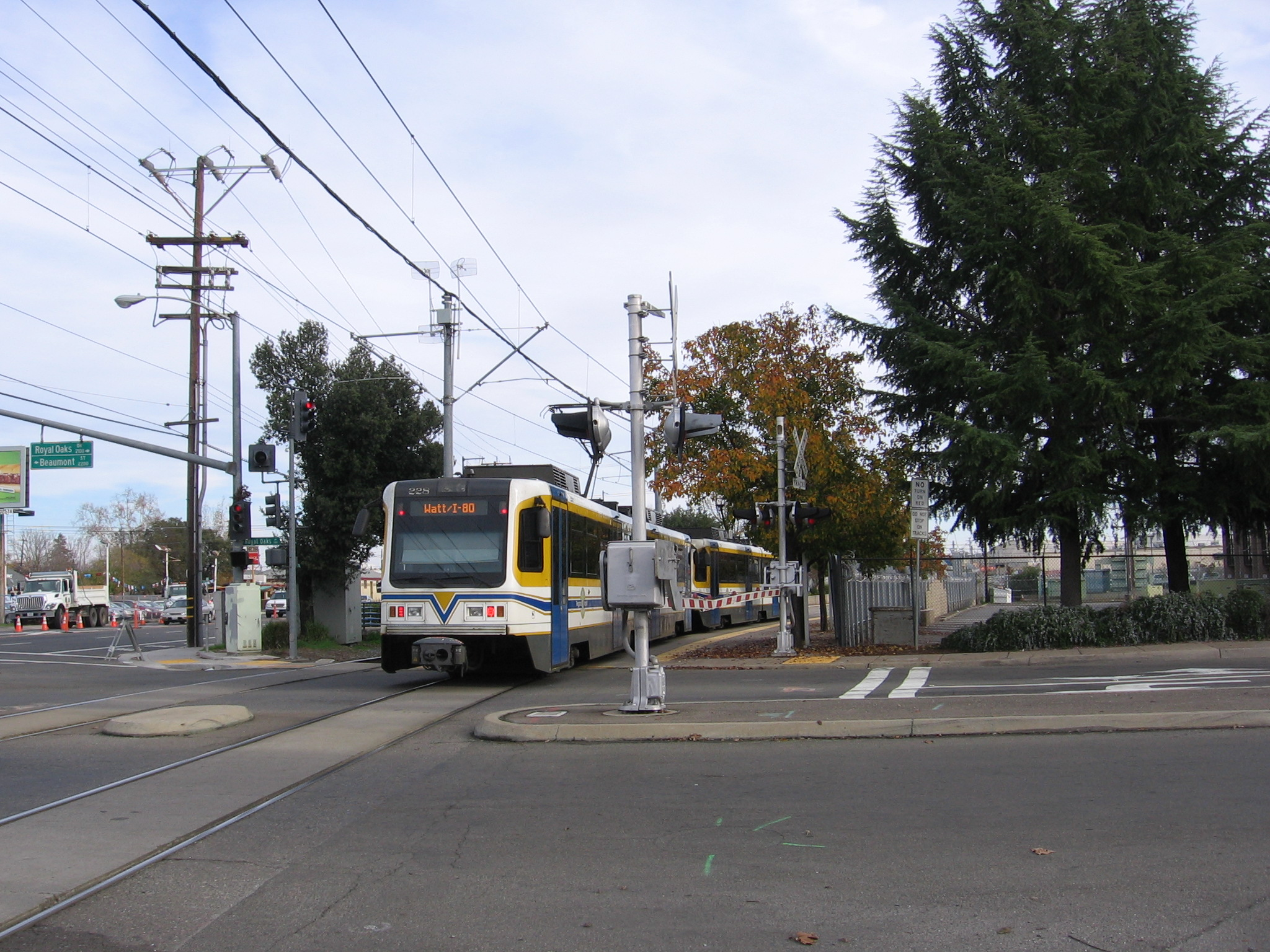
- Light rail train at Royal Oaks station

General information
- Location: Arden Way at Royal Oaks Drive; Sacramento, California; United States
- Coordinates: 38°36′22″N 121°26′52″W
- Owner: Sacramento Regional Transit District
- Platforms: 2 side platforms
- Tracks: 2
- Connections: Sacramento Regional Transit: 13, 23

Construction
- Structure type: At-grade
- Parking: 311 spaces
- Accessible: Yes

History
- Opened: March 12, 1987

Services
Preceding station	SacRT	Following station
Swanston toward Watt/I-80	Blue Line	Arden/Del Paso toward Cosumnes River College
Location

Royal Oaks station is an at-grade light rail station on the Blue Line of the SacRT light rail system operated by the Sacramento Regional Transit District. The station is located alongside Arden Way at its intersection with Royal Oaks Drive, after which the station is named, in the city of Sacramento, California.
