= Marconi/Arcade station =

Transit station in Sacramento, California

Marconi/Arcade
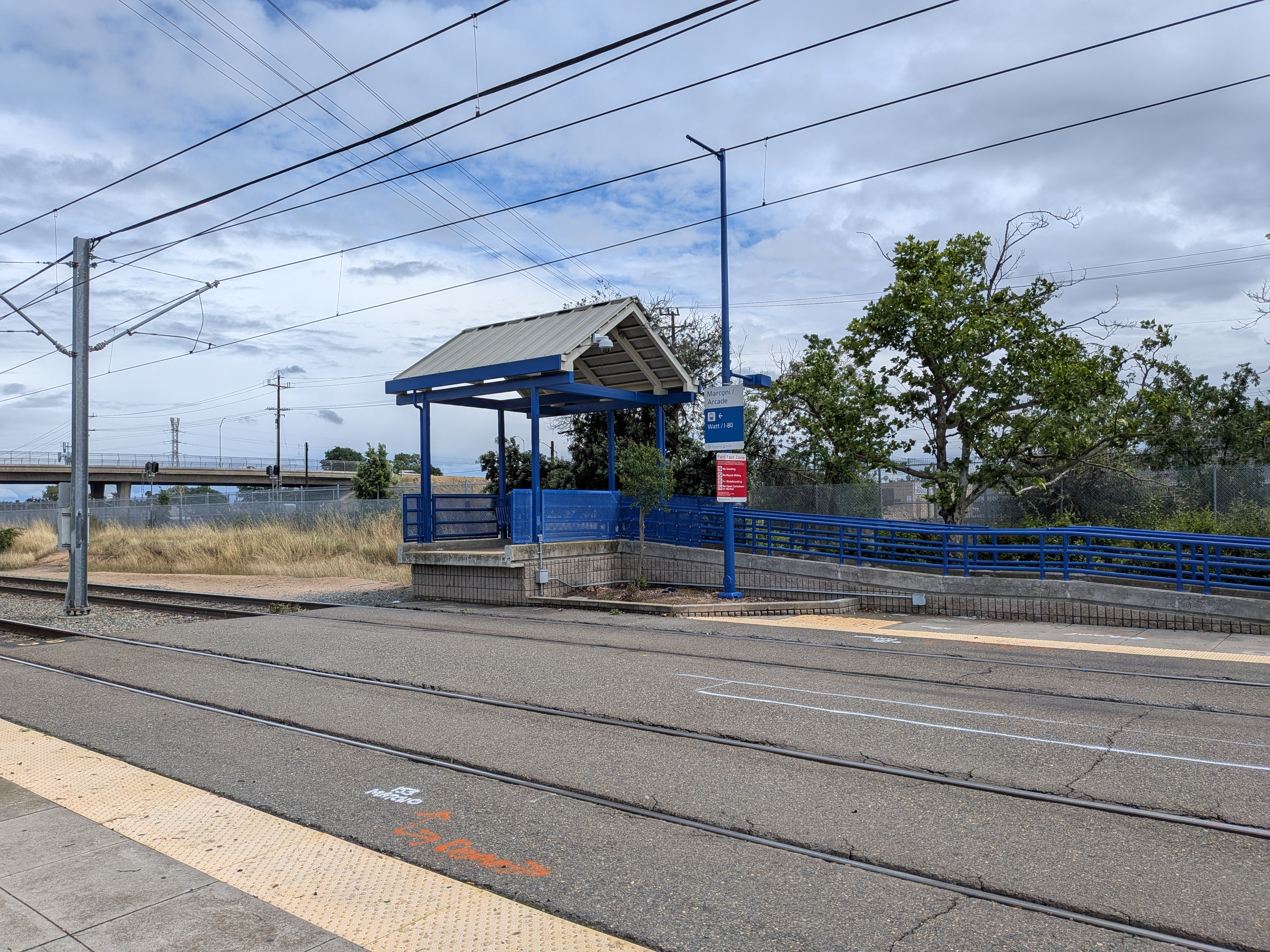
- Station platform in 2026

General information
- Location: Auburn Boulevard at Marconi Avenue; Sacramento, California; United States
- Coordinates: 38°37′17″N 121°25′29″W
- Owner: Sacramento Regional Transit District
- Platforms: 2 side platforms
- Tracks: 2
- Connections: Sacramento Regional Transit: 25, 86, 87, SmaRT Ride Natomas-North Sacramento

Construction
- Structure type: At-grade
- Parking: 416 spaces
- Cycle facilities: Lockers
- Accessible: Yes

History
- Opened: March 12, 1987

Services
Preceding station	SacRT	Following station
Roseville Road toward Watt/I-80	Blue Line	Swanston toward Cosumnes River College
Location

Marconi/Arcade station is a Sacramento RT light rail station in Sacramento, California, United States. It is located in the Arden-Arcade neighborhood near the Marconi Avenue arterial.

The station was opened on March 12, 1987, and is operated by the Sacramento Regional Transit District as part of the Blue Line. In 1990, it was proposed as a station location for the Capitols service.
