= Town & Country Village (Palo Alto) =

Outdoor shopping malls

Coordinates: 37.4384°N 122.1592°W

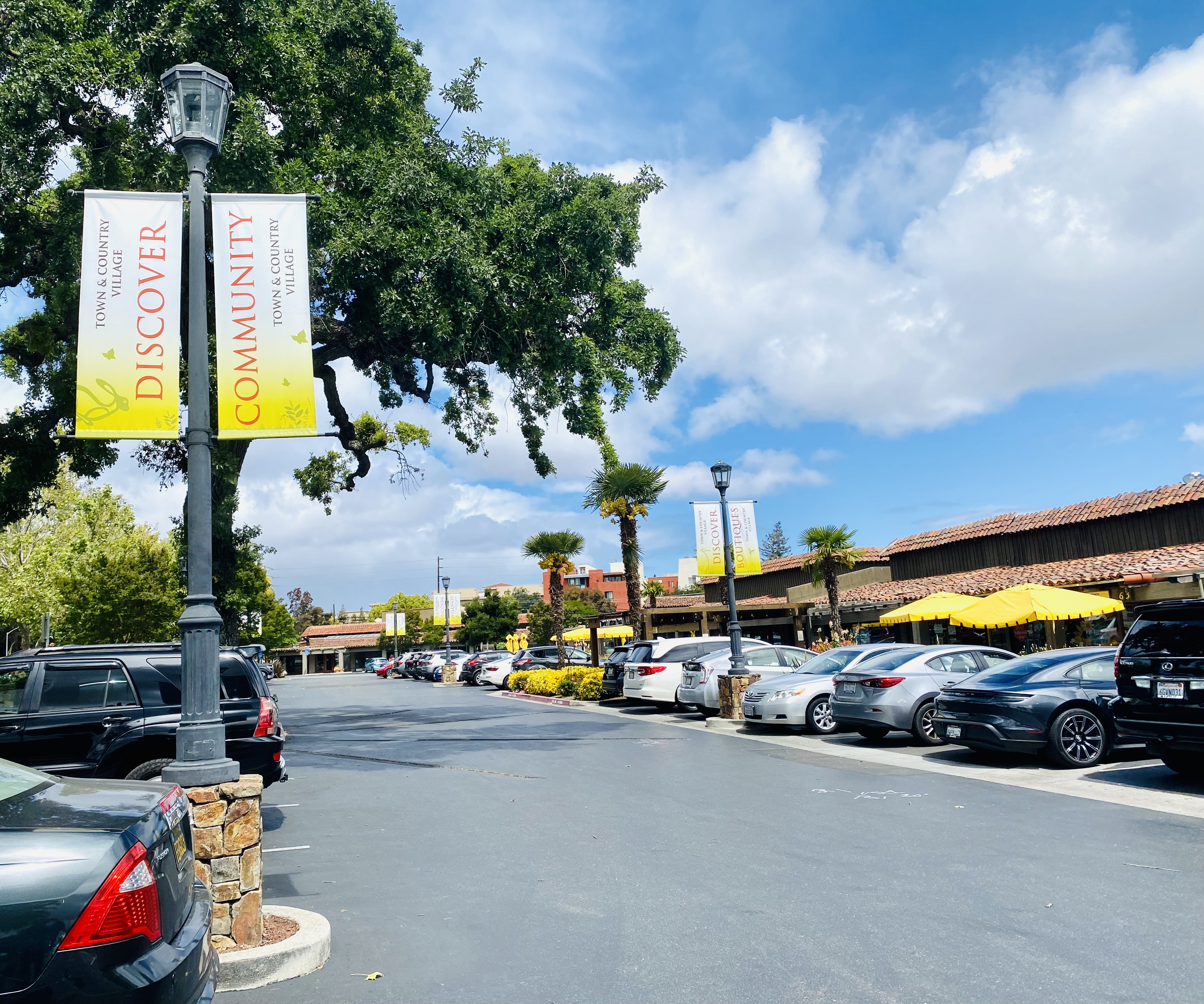
Town & Country Village sign (2022)

Town & Country Village is an outdoor shopping center in Palo Alto, Santa Clara County, California, United States, opened in 1953. The shopping center is at the corner of El Camino Real and Embarcadero Road, opposite Stanford University and Palo Alto High School.

The land was previously a Mexican land grant, Rancho del Arroyo de San Francisquito, which was divided into smaller lots after it passed to heirs of the original grantee. The mall land was a 14-acre (5.7 ha) parcel that had come to be known as "the Greer property."

The design allowed the preservation of 70 to 100 mature oak trees. The buildings were constructed, in part, from salvaged fir and redwood logging trestles built in the early 1840s further north in the state. There was originally 100,000 ft^{2} (9,300 m^{2}) of retail space and 1,200 parking spaces. The developer was Palo Alto resident Ronald Williams (1908–2001), and the construction company was Bayshore Construction. Williams developed three other "outdoor retail centers" around the same time, including at sites in nearby San Jose and Sunnyvale. The San Jose location was built in 1959 in the same architectural style at the intersection of Stevens Creek Boulevard and Winchester.

The mall was marketed as having "the leisurely atmosphere of the Old West" while being "easy to get to" with "over 1,000 parking spaces." Early tenants included AE Cramer's Toy Box, Hinkley's Fine Men's Wear, Stickney's Hick'ry House, and Edy's Ice Cream Shop. By 1957 there were 75 shops open in the mall, and a "Town & Country Playtown for kids, with a car ride, merry-go-round, and train exhibition." A sandwich shop called the Village Cheese House was in business from 1959 until 2019. By the late 1990s two anchor tenants—the Hickory House and John's Town & Country Market grocery store—had closed and their spaces had languished unrented; critics argued that "the center's old-time feel, signs and marketing [had become] more tired than nostalgic." Williams died in 2001, and Ellis Partners bought the mall from his heirs in 2004. In 2005 there was 171,000 ft^{2} (15,900 m^{2}) of office and retail space.

== See also ==
- Stanford Shopping Center
- List of shopping malls in California
