= Foothill Farms, California =

Foothill Farms
- census-designated place
- Interactive map of Foothill Farms
- Location in California Location in the United States
- Coordinates: 38°40.9′N 121°20.9′W
- Country: United States
- State: California
- County: Sacramento

Area
  - Total: 4.200 sq mi (10.88 km^{2})
  - Land: 4.200 sq mi (10.88 km^{2})
  - Water: 0 sq mi (0 km^{2}) 0%
- Elevation: 135 ft (41 m)

Population (2020)
  - Total: 35,834
  - Density: 8,532/sq mi (3,294/km^{2})
- Time zone: UTC-8 (PST)
  - Summer (DST): UTC-7 (PDT)
- ZIP code: 95841,95842
- Area codes: 916, 279
- FIPS code: 06-24722
- GNIS feature ID: 0277517

Foothill Farms is a census-designated place (CDP) and unincorporated community in Sacramento County, California, United States. It is part of the Sacramento metropolitan area. The population was 35,834 at the 2020 census, up from 33,121 at the 2010 census. Foothill Farms is part of the greater North Highlands-Foothill Farms community, and comprises the zip codes 95841 and 95842.

== Geography ==
Foothill Farms is located at 38°40.9′N 121°20.9′W (38.6817, -121.3478).

According to the United States Census Bureau, the CDP has a total area of 4.2 square miles (11 km^{2}), all land.

== Demographics ==
Historical population
Census	Pop.	Note	%±
2000	17,426		—
2010	33,121		90.1%
2020	35,834		8.2%
U.S. Decennial Census

=== 2020 census ===
As of the 2020 census, Foothill Farms had a population of 35,834 and a population density of 8,531.9 inhabitants per square mile (3,294.2/km^{2}). The census reported that 99.8% of residents lived in households, 58 people (0.2%) lived in non-institutionalized group quarters, and 15 people were institutionalized. 100.0% of residents lived in urban areas and 0.0% lived in rural areas.

The age distribution was 26.2% under the age of 18, 9.0% aged 18 to 24, 30.4% aged 25 to 44, 22.6% aged 45 to 64, and 11.9% who were 65 years of age or older. The median age was 33.9 years. For every 100 females, there were 94.6 males, and for every 100 females age 18 and over there were 91.6 males.

There were 12,453 households; 37.2% had children under the age of 18 living in them. Of all households, 42.3% were married-couple households, 8.4% were cohabiting couple households, 30.2% had a female householder with no spouse or partner present, and 19.1% had a male householder with no spouse or partner present. About 22.4% of households were made up of individuals and 8.4% had someone living alone who was 65 or older. The average household size was 2.87. There were 8,671 families (69.6% of all households).

There were 12,716 housing units at an average density of 3,027.6 units per square mile (1,169.0 units/km^{2}), of which 12,453 (97.9%) were occupied. Of these, 53.2% were owner-occupied and 46.8% were renter-occupied. Overall, 2.1% of all units were vacant, including a 0.6% homeowner vacancy rate and a 1.9% rental vacancy rate.

Racial composition as of the 2020 census
Race	Number	Percent
White	18,897	52.7%
Black or African American	4,130	11.5%
American Indian and Alaska Native	398	1.1%
Asian	3,024	8.4%
Native Hawaiian and Other Pacific Islander	335	0.9%
Some other race	4,236	11.8%
Two or more races	4,814	13.4%
Hispanic or Latino (of any race)	8,319	23.2%

=== 2023 American Community Survey ===
In 2023, the US Census Bureau estimated that 25.8% of the population were foreign-born. Of all people aged 5 or older, 61.9% spoke only English at home, 12.9% spoke Spanish, 17.3% spoke other Indo-European languages, 5.5% spoke Asian or Pacific Islander languages, and 2.5% spoke other languages. Of those aged 25 or older, 88.1% were high school graduates and 16.8% had a bachelor's degree.

The median household income was $68,042, and the per capita income was $27,416. About 13.2% of families and 16.7% of the population were below the poverty line.

=== 2010 census ===
At the 2010 census Foothill Farms had a population of 33,121. The population density was 7,889.8 inhabitants per square mile (3,046.3/km^{2}). The racial makeup of Foothill Farms was 21,249 (64.2%) White, 4,002 (12.8 %) African American, 357 (1.1%) Native American, 1,731 (5.2%) Asian, 208 (0.6%) Pacific Islander, 3,362 (10.2%) from other races, and 2,586 (7.8%) from two or more races. Hispanic or Latino of any race were 7,579 persons (22.9%).

The census reported that 33,072 people (99.9% of the population) lived in households, 33 (0.1%) lived in non-institutionalized group quarters, and 16 (0%) were institutionalized.

There were 11,726 households, 4,768 (40.7%) had children under the age of 18 living in them, 5,073 (43.3%) were opposite-sex married couples living together, 2,276 (19.4%) had a female householder with no husband present, 869 (7.4%) had a male householder with no wife present. There were 1,056 (9.0%) unmarried opposite-sex partnerships, and 88 (0.8%) same-sex married couples or partnerships. 2,575 households (22.0%) were one person and 667 (5.7%) had someone living alone who was 65 or older. The average household size was 2.82. There were 8,218 families (70.1% of households); the average family size was 3.29.

The age distribution was 9,219 people (27.8%) under the age of 18, 3,803 people (11.5%) aged 18 to 24, 9,592 people (29.0%) aged 25 to 44, 7,642 people (23.1%) aged 45 to 64, and 2,865 people (8.7%) who were 65 or older. The median age was 31.1 years. For every 100 females, there were 95.3 males. For every 100 females age 18 and over, there were 90.6 males.

There were 12,607 housing units at an average density of 3,003.1 per square mile, of the occupied units 6,297 (53.7%) were owner-occupied and 5,429 (46.3%) were rented. The homeowner vacancy rate was 2.6%; the rental vacancy rate was 7.2%. 16,582 people (50.1% of the population) lived in owner-occupied housing units and 16,490 people (49.8%) lived in rental housing units.

== Politics ==
In the California State Legislature, Foothill Farms is in the 6th senatorial district, represented by Republican Roger Niello, and in the 7th Assembly district, represented by Republican Josh Hoover.

In the United States House of Representatives, Foothill Farms is in California's 6th congressional district.

Foothill Farms is represented by independent Rich Desmond on the Sacramento County Board of Supervisors

Twin Rivers Unified School District Area 1 (Old Foothill Farms) is represented by Nonpartisan Michael Baker. Twin River Unified School District Area 2 (New Foothill Farms) is represented by Nonpartisan Sharon Reichelt.
