= Town & Country Village (Sacramento) =

- Location: Marconi & Fulton Avenues, Sacramento, California, United States
- Coordinates: 38.618924°N 121.400174°W
- Opened: 1946
- Developer: John W. Davis, Jeré Strizek
- Owner: Phillips Edison & Company, Inc.
- Num. of stores: 28
- Floor area: 216,192 square feet (20,084.9 m^{2}) (GLA)
- Floors: 1
- Website: shoptownandcountry.com

Town & Country Village is a shopping center in Arden-Arcade, California, in the United States (with a Sacramento address), in the Sacramento area. It is located at the northeast corner of Marconi and Fulton Avenues.

Town & Country Village was the first suburban, auto-oriented shopping center in the Sacramento metropolitan area and one of the first in the United States, opening in 1946 with 65 shops.

== History ==
Town & Country Village opened in September 1946. It was designed by John W. Davis and built by contractor Jeré Strizek, a home builder. Strizek went on to manage the boutique center, which included entertaining and signing Joseph Magnin to open in the Village. Town & Country Village became a favorite shopping destination county wide. By 1949, the complex had 60 stores, a restaurant, and a nearby theater.

In the 1990s, Town & Country Village was expanded, which included the addition of Trader Joe’s, more retail space and a Lucky supermarket. It was later converted to Albertsons in 1999 and Save Mart in 2007. Save Mart was shuttered in March 2016.

In 2013, most of the original Town & Country Village was demolished to make way for big-box retailers, which included Bed Bath & Beyond, Ross Dress for Less, and T. J. Maxx. In 2018, Ulta Beauty opened in a space vacated by a short-lived Famous Footwear. In July of that year, Sprouts Farmers Market opened in a portion of the former Save Mart, followed by Five Below in June 2020, opening in another portion. Bed Bath & Beyond was shuttered on July 30, 2023, as part of the company’s bankruptcy and subsequent liquidation of its remaining stores. Its space is now occupied by Bob's Discount Furniture, which opened on September 15, 2025.
