= Arden/Del Paso station =

Arden/Del Paso
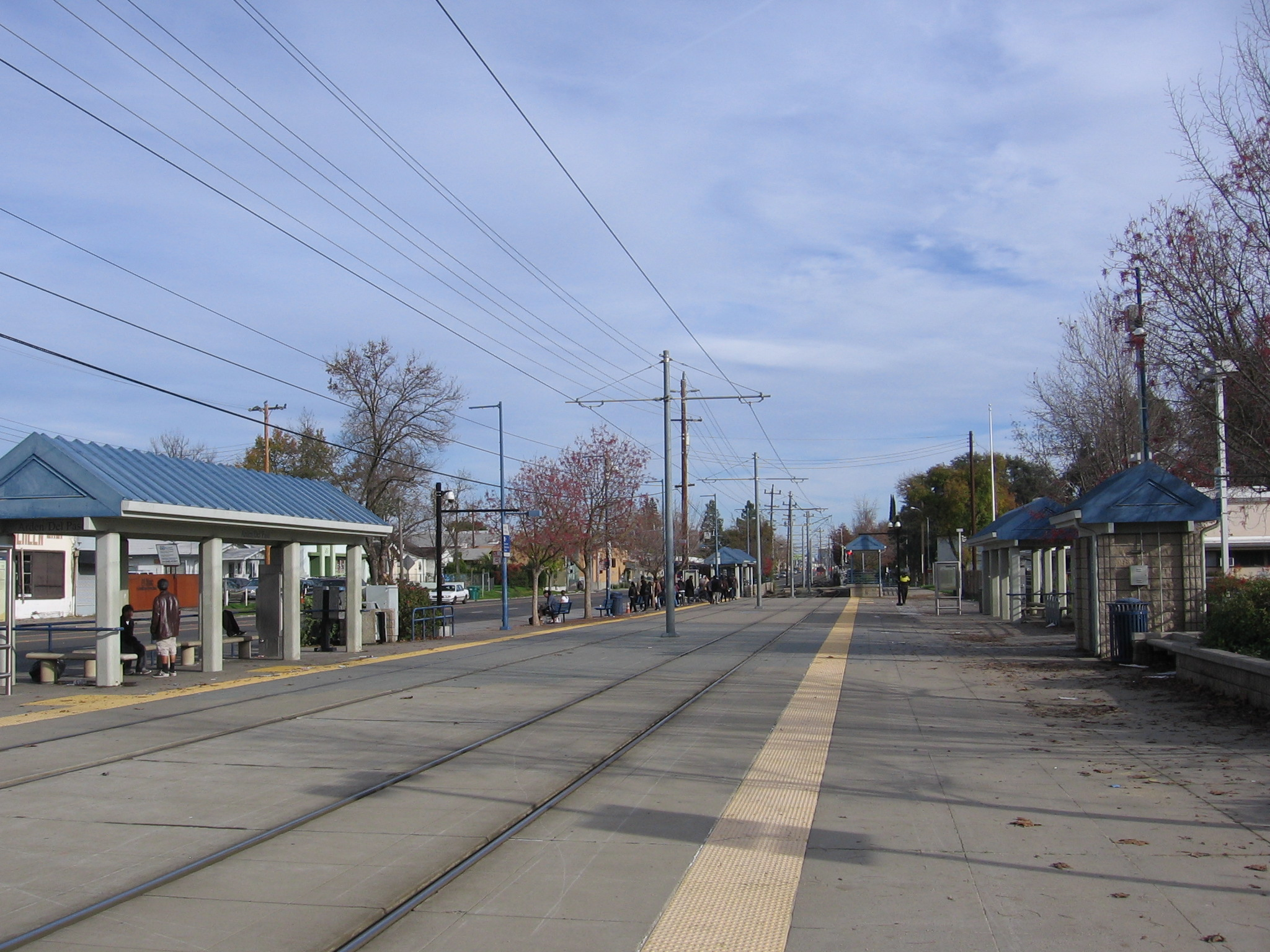
- Arden/Del Paso station platforms, December 2012

General information
- Location: Arden Way at Del Paso Boulevard; Sacramento, California; United States
- Coordinates: 38°36′23″N 121°27′25″W
- Owner: Sacramento Regional Transit District
- Platforms: 2 side platforms
- Tracks: 2
- Connections: Sacramento Regional Transit: 13, 15, 19, 23, 88, 113

Construction
- Structure type: At-grade
- Parking: 35 spaces
- Accessible: Yes

History
- Opened: March 12, 1987

Services
Preceding station	SacRT	Following station
Royal Oaks toward Watt/I-80	Blue Line	Globe toward Cosumnes River College
Location

Arden/Del Paso station is an at-grade light rail station on the Blue Line of the SacRT light rail system operated by the Sacramento Regional Transit District. The station is located alongside Arden Way at its intersection with Del Paso Boulevard, after which the station is named, in the city of Sacramento, California. The station serves as a major bus transfer point and is served by six routes.

The station also has a small 35 space park and ride lot. The lot was closed between June 2024 and May 2026 to allow for the construction of an affordable housing development adjacent to the lot.
