= Interstate 80 Business (Sacramento, California) =

Interstate Highway business loop in Sacramento, California, United States

Interstate 80 Business
- Capital City Freeway
- Business 80, with both the US 50 segment and the unsigned SR 51 segment highlighted in red

Route information
- Business route of I-80
- Maintained by Caltrans
- Length: 14.49 mi (23.32 km)
- Existed: 1981 (from I-80)–present
- Component highways: US 50 / I-305 from West Sacramento to Sacramento; SR 51 in Sacramento

Major junctions
- West end: I-80 in West Sacramento
- I-5 in Sacramento; US 50 / SR 99 in Sacramento; SR 160 in Sacramento
- East end: I-80 in North Highlands

Location
- Country: United States
- State: California
- Counties: Yolo, Sacramento

Highway system
- Interstate Highway System; Main; Auxiliary; Suffixed; Business; Future; State highways in California; Interstate; US; State; Scenic; History; Pre‑1964; Unconstructed; Deleted; Freeways
← US 50	SR 51	→ SR 52

Interstate 80 Business (I-80 Bus), called the Capital City Freeway in its entirety and also known as Business 80, is a business loop of Interstate 80 (I-80) through Sacramento, California, United States, and one of the two business routes of I-80 in California. The entire route is a freeway and the only business route in California to be one.

It originally carried mainline I-80 through Sacramento until the early 1980s. The eastern half, originally known as the Elvas Freeway, was initially grandfathered into the Interstate Highway System; however, plans to upgrade or realign this portion to meet Interstate Highway standards were canceled. As such, the I-80 designation through Sacramento was moved to a northern bypass of the city that had previously been signed I-880, and the former routing was then designated as Business 80.

I-80 Bus then consisted of two connected segments. The western segment ran concurrently signed with US Route 50 (US 50) and also carried the unsigned designation of I-305. The eastern segment was assigned the unsigned designation of State Route 51 (SR 51). After travelers complained that I-80 Bus was difficult to follow, it was named the Capital City Freeway in 1996. As part of a resigning project which commenced in 2016, references to I-80 Bus on the western segment were being removed, subsequently leaving that portion only signed as US 50. The California Department of Transportation (Caltrans) however still lists the entire route under one I-80 Bus exit list.

== Route description ==
Both SR 51 and I-305 (the eastern and western segments of I-80 Bus, respectively) are part of the National Highway System, a network of highways that are considered essential to the country's economy, defense, and mobility by the Federal Highway Administration (FHWA), and SR 51 is part of the California Freeway and Expressway System. Currently, I-80 Bus is the only Interstate business route in California to exist as a freeway.

=== US Route 50/Interstate 305 segment ===
Interstate 305
- Location: Sacramento, California
- Length: 5.63 mi (9.06 km)

The western section of I-80 Bus begins in West Sacramento at I-80, where I-80 leaves the West Sacramento Freeway onto the Beltline Freeway, which travels north of the Bryte neighborhood, over the Sacramento River, and into the Natomas area. This interchange in West Sacramento is also the current west end of US 50, as well as the unsigned I-305. The I-80 Bus/US 50/unsigned I-305 segment then runs approximately 5.63 miles (9.06 km) from I-80 west to SR 99 southeast of Downtown Sacramento, though only US 50 is signed in this portion.

In downtown West Sacramento, I-80 Bus/US 50/unsigned I-305 split from the West Sacramento Freeway, which is now locally maintained in part over the Tower Bridge up to the door of the capitol but was once designated as SR 275. I-80 Bus/US 50/unsigned I-305 then crosses the Sacramento River on the Pioneer Memorial Bridge, intersecting with I-5 on the eastern river bank. It then runs on top of an embankment between W and X streets to SR 99. The W-X Freeway gets its name from running parallel to W and X streets.

Beginning in 2016, signs along the western segment were being updated to remove references to I-80 Bus and instead sign the route only as US 50. However, Caltrans still lists this segment under the I-80 Bus exit list instead of the US 50 one, and mapmakers to this day may continue to sign both the eastern and western sections as part of I-80 Bus.

=== State Route 51 ===
State Route 51
- Location: Sacramento, California
- Length: 8.86 mi (14.26 km)
- Existed: 1981–present

The unsigned State Route 51 (SR 51) is defined as follows in sections 351 and 351.1 of the California Streets and Highways Code:

351. Route 51 is from Route 50 in Sacramento to Route 80 east of Sacramento.

351.1. Notwithstanding Section 640, Route 51 shall be signed Interstate Business Loop 80.

Despite the legal definition, exit numbers assigned along SR 51 start at 6 instead of 1 or 0, treating I-80 Bus as one continuous route.

At the interchange southeast of Downtown Sacramento, I-80 Bus turns north onto unsigned SR 51 near its southern end. US 50 continues east, SR 99 heads south, and the unsigned I-305 ends. The elevated freeway carrying I-80 Bus east of downtown is between 29th and 30th streets, and an older section beginning at A Street and continuing northeast was originally known as the Elvas Freeway (originally signed as US 99E). On this section of freeway, I-80 Bus crosses the American River before its northeast-bound merge with the North Sacramento Freeway (the northern portion of SR 160 toward downtown).

The North Sacramento Freeway, originally a portion of US 40, originally ran west from Marconi Avenue to an intersection with Del Paso Boulevard. The section from Arden Way eastbound back to Marconi Avenue is now part of the currently named Capital City Freeway (while the SR 160 section retains the original freeway name). The original North Sacramento Freeway connected to the Roseville Freeway at the curve north of Marconi Avenue (commonly known as the Marconi Curve, where the freeway once ended at Auburn Boulevard). At the east end of I-80 Bus, the Roseville Freeway continues northeast to Roseville as I-80, while the short unsigned SR 244 heads east to Auburn Boulevard.

I-80 heads in both directions around the north side of Sacramento. A partially built portion of a never completed replacement freeway for SR 51, in the median of I-80, now serves as parking and access for the northernmost three stations (Watt/I-80, Watt/I-80 West, and Roseville Road) on the Sacramento Regional Transit District's light rail Blue Line. If this replacement freeway had been completely built as originally planned, I-80 would have continued south following the railroad tracks going through the Ben Ali neighborhood of North Sacramento, crossed over SR 160, and joined with the Elvas Freeway portion just north of A Street.

== History ==
The State Division of Highways (predecessor to Caltrans) constructed Sacramento's freeways system incrementally from the 1940s to the 1970s. The plan for the Elvas Freeway was presented in the Sacramento Area Traffic Survey in 1947–1948, and the freeway was built between 1950 and 1955. The Division of Highways built the 2.9-mile (4.7 km) Elvas Freeway as a four-lane divided highway (with provisions for a six-lane freeway) to connect with the North Sacramento Freeway in the vicinity of Arden Way. The new freeway's southern terminus was the surface roads at 29th and 30th streets. At the time, the Elvas Freeway was conceived and built, the Division of Highways was already considering an elevated freeway along the 29th Street/30th Street corridor that would connect with the then proposed South Sacramento Freeway (SR 99). The Division of Highways went on to complete the Fort Sutter Viaduct along the 29th Street/30th Street corridor in 1968, which led the Division of Highways to convert the Elvas Freeway from four to six lanes in 1965. The Sacramento River Viaduct was completed in 1966, the Southside Park Viaduct was completed in 1967, and the rest of the W-X Freeway was completed in 1968. The Elvas Freeway was connected to the W-X Freeway to the west and US 50 to the east, in 1968 and 1971, respectively. The W-X Freeway and the Elvas Freeway were signed as I-80.

Between 1968 and 1975, a 5.2-mile (8.4 km) bypass was proposed that was to straighten the alignment of I-80 and increase its capacity. The Sacramento City Council voted in September 1979 to delete the I-80 bypass freeway from the Interstate System. In 1980 California submitted to the American Association of State Highway and Transportation Officials (AASHTO) proposals to relocate I-80 in Sacramento onto then I-880, extend US 50 west to cover the west half of old I-80, and to assign I-305 to the west half of old I-80, and delete I-880 in the Sacramento area. I-880 would eventually be relocated to then SR 17 from I-280 in San Jose to I-80 and I-580 (now at the MacArthur Maze) in Oakland in 1982–1984. AASHTO approved these proposals. The next year, the California State Legislature extended US 50 west to cover the western half of old I-80, and the eastern half was assigned the new SR 51 number and designated as I-80 Bus. The signage change from I-880 to I-80, and the previous I-80 to I-80 Bus was installed in November 1983.

The old I-80 was not signed as SR 51 but as a business route. Unlike most business routes in California, which run along locally maintained streets through a downtown area, I-80 Bus was not assigned to the pre-freeway alignment of US 40, but to a freeway. The existence of two freeways, both numbered 80, caused some confusion, and, in 1996, the full route was given the Capital City Freeway name at the request of the Sacramento Area Council of Governments. This name appears on overhead signs at prominent interchanges. The route is referred to as Business 80, Biz 80, Capital City Freeway, Cap City Freeway, and US 50 (western section only) by residents and mapmakers. Caltrans does not normally use the I-80 Bus designation, except for signage and other related concepts like Cal-NExUS exit numbers (which are continuous along the business loop). Caltrans refers to the western half as US 50 and the eastern half as SR 51 for traffic condition reporting.

Under section 351.1 of the California Streets and Highways Code, "Route 51 shall be signed Interstate Business Loop 80. There is no such mandate under section 350 for Route 50, thus Caltrans was able to start removing references to I-80 Bus on signage in the US 50 segment. Caltrans considers the Capital City Freeway to be from the interchange with US 50/SR 99 to I-80. Meanwhile, a separate legislative designation for I-305 has never been added to the Streets and Highways Code, and that Interstate remains unsigned to this day.

Despite Caltrans's official signage and reporting practices, mapmakers may still show the I-305 and SR 51 designations, as well as the I-80 Bus/US 50 concurrency on the western segment. The SR 99 concurrency, running along US 50 and I-5 to northern Sacramento, is also not officially designated by Caltrans, but mapmakers will still also often show it as such.

An earlier SR 51 was defined on July 1, 1964, on a section of pre-1964 Legislative Route 2, providing a loop east of I-5 (pre-1964 Legislative Route 174 there) through Orange via Main Street, around the Orange Crush interchange (where I-5 intersects with SR 22 and SR 57), and west back to I-5 in Anaheim via Orangewood Avenue. It was removed from the state highway system in 1965.

The proposed Yolo 80 Corridor Improvements Project would add high-occupancy toll (HOT) lanes along the segment of US 50/Business 80 between I-80 in West Sacramento and I-5 in Sacramento by the end of the 2020s.

== Exit list ==
Under the official exit list by Caltrans, mileage is measured along I-80 BL as one continuous route, instead of unsigned SR 51 having its own separate set of mileage and exit numbers.

County	Location	mi	km	Exit	Destinations	Notes
Yolo	West Sacramento	0.00	0.00		I-80 west – San Francisco	Western terminus of I-80 BL / US 50 / I-305; western end of US 50 / I-305 concurrency; former US 40 west / US 99W north
Yolo	West Sacramento	0.35	0.56	1A	I-80 east – Reno	Former I-880 east; I-80 exit 82
Yolo	West Sacramento			—	I-80 Express Lanes west	Proposed; Express Lanes access only; westbound exit and eastbound entrance
Yolo	West Sacramento			—	Yolo Express Lanes	Proposed westernmost access point on mainline I-80 BL / US 50
Yolo	West Sacramento	1.20	1.93	1B	Harbor Boulevard	Signed as exit 1 eastbound
Yolo	West Sacramento	2.50	4.02	3	Downtown Sacramento (SR 275) / Jefferson Boulevard (SR 84)	Eastbound exit and westbound entrance; connects to Cabaldon Parkway; SR 275 is former US 40 east / US 99W south
Yolo	West Sacramento	2.50	4.02	3	Jefferson Boulevard (SR 84) / South River Road	Westbound exit and eastbound entrance
Sacramento River		3.16	5.09	Pioneer Memorial Bridge		
Sacramento	Sacramento	3.51	5.65	4A	I-5 to SR 99 north – Redding, Los Angeles	Western end of SR 99 concurrency; I-5 exit 518
Sacramento	Sacramento			—	Yolo Express Lanes	East end of proposed Express Lanes
Sacramento	Sacramento	3.77	6.07	4B	5th Street – Downtown Sacramento	Eastbound exit and westbound entrance; former SR 99
Sacramento	Sacramento	3.77	6.07	4B	10th Street – Downtown Sacramento	Westbound exit and eastbound entrance
Sacramento	Sacramento	4.53	7.29	5	15th Street	Eastbound exit and westbound entrance; former US 99W / SR 160
Sacramento	Sacramento	4.53	7.29	5	16th Street	Westbound exit and eastbound entrance; former US 99W / SR 160
Sacramento	Sacramento	5.64	9.08	Caltrans signs this as western terminus of I-80 BL		
Sacramento	Sacramento	5.64	9.08	6A-B	US 50 east (Lincoln Highway) / SR 99 south (South Sacramento Freeway) – South Lake Tahoe, Fresno	Eastern terminus of unsigned I-305; eastern end of US 50 / SR 99 / I-305 concurrency; western end of unsigned SR 51 concurrency; US 50 west exit 6C; SR 51 exit 6A
Sacramento	Sacramento	5.88	9.46	6C	T Street	Eastbound exit and westbound entrance; exit only accessible from SR 99 north; entrance goes directly to SR 99 south
Sacramento	Sacramento	5.88	9.46	6C	P Street	Westbound exit and eastbound entrance
Sacramento	Sacramento	6.48	10.43	7A	N Street	Eastbound exit and westbound entrance
Sacramento	Sacramento	6.48	10.43	7A	J Street	Westbound exit and eastbound entrance
Sacramento	Sacramento	6.84	11.01	7B	H Street	Eastbound exit and westbound entrance
Sacramento	Sacramento	6.84	11.01	7B	E Street	Westbound exit and eastbound entrance
Sacramento	Sacramento	9.00	14.48	9A	Exposition Boulevard – Cal Expo	No eastbound entrance (access is via SR 160)
Sacramento	Sacramento	9.33	15.02	9B	SR 160 south (North Sacramento Freeway) – Downtown Sacramento	Westbound exit and eastbound entrance; former US 40
Sacramento	Sacramento	9.70	15.61	10A	Arden Way	Signed as exit 9B eastbound
Sacramento	Sacramento	10.38	16.70	10B	El Camino Avenue – Carmichael	Signed as exit 10 eastbound
Sacramento	Sacramento	11.14	17.93	11	Auburn Boulevard / Marconi Avenue	No eastbound entrance
Sacramento	Sacramento	11.60	18.67	12A	Howe Avenue	Eastbound exit and entrance
Sacramento	Sacramento	11.85	19.07	12B	Auburn Boulevard / Bell Street	Eastbound exit only; Auburn Boulevard is former US 40
Sacramento	Sacramento	12.43	20.00	12C	Fulton Avenue	Signed as exit 12 westbound
Sacramento	Sacramento	13.61	21.90	14A	Watt Avenue south	No westbound exit; connects to I-80 west
Sacramento	Sacramento	13.61– 14.23	21.90– 22.90	14B-C	Watt Avenue / Auburn Boulevard (SR 244)	Signed as exits 14B (Watt Ave. north) and 14C (Auburn Blvd.) eastbound, 14A (Auburn Blvd.) and 14B (Watt Ave.) westbound; Auburn Boulevard is former US 40
Sacramento	North Highlands	14.50	23.34		I-80 east – Reno	No access to I-80 west; eastern terminus of I-80 BL / unsigned SR 51; eastern end of unsigned SR 51 concurrency; I-80 west exit 95
1.000 mi = 1.609 km; 1.000 km = 0.621 mi: Concurrency terminus; Incomplete access; Route transition; Unopened

== See also ==
- Transportation in the Sacramento metropolitan area
