= Rocklin =

Rocklin may refer to:

== Places ==
- Rocklin, California, a city in the United States
  - Rocklin station
  - Rocklin Unified School District
  - Rocklin High School
- Rocklin, Nova Scotia, a community in Canada

== People with the surname ==
- Nicole Rocklin, American film producer
