= Madison Ayson =

American soccer player (born 2001)

Personal information
- Full name: Madison Francis Ayson
- Date of birth: January 22, 2001 (age 25)
- Place of birth: Roseville, California, United States
- Height: 5 ft 9 in (1.75 m)
- Position: Centre-back

Team information
- Current team: Canberra United
- Number: 22

Youth career
- 2015–2017: San Juan Spirits
- 2017–2019: Davis Legacy SC

College career
Years	Team	Apps	(Gls)
2019–2022	Stanford Cardinal	44	(1)
2023	Xavier Musketeers	22	(3)

Senior career*
Years	Team	Apps	(Gls)
2023	California Storm	–	(–)
2024	Houston Dash	1	(0)
2024–2025	Canberra United	14	(2)
2025–2026	Sydney FC	14	(1)
2026	California Storm	7	(0)
2026–	Canberra United	0	(0)
- * Club domestic league appearances and goals as of June 16, 2026

Madison Francis Ayson (born January 22, 2001) is a professional soccer player who plays as a defender for A-League Women club Canberra United. She played college soccer for the Stanford Cardinal and the Xavier Musketeers before starting her professional career with the Houston Dash of the National Women's Soccer League (NWSL). She has previously been a member of Sydney FC. Born in the United States, Ayson has been called up to represent the Philippines national team.

== Early life ==
Born in Roseville, California, Ayson grew up alongside two older brothers in the neighboring town of Rocklin, one of whom died from suicide in January 2022. She played soccer and ran track at Granite Oaks Middle School, where she was a member of a 4x100m relay team who broke the school record. Ayson then attended Rocklin High School, where she captained the soccer team for three years and helped lift the school to several division playoff appearances. Outside of school, Ayson played club soccer for the San Juan Spirits before switching to Davis Legacy SC in 2017.

== College career ==
Ayson matriculated at Stanford University from 2019 to 2022, playing for the Cardinal soccer team in all four years of her tenure at Stanford. As a freshman, Ayson played as a center back and did not start in any of her 13 appearances. She was part of the Cardinal team who won the 2019 NCAA College Cup, which culminated in a penalty shootout victory over North Carolina. Ayson recorded her first (and only) Cardinal goal on August 29, 2021, in a 6–0 drubbing of San Diego State. In her time at Stanford, she made 44 appearances and 5 starts.

Ayson spent the offseason after her senior year at Stanford playing for the California Storm of the pre-professional USL W League. In May 2023, Ayson transferred to Xavier University as a graduate student. She played with the Musketeers women's soccer program for one year, racking up 22 appearances. Ayson also scored a career-high 3 goals, netting her first in a 5–1 victory over Western Kentucky on August 27, 2023.

== Club career ==
After initially training with Houston Dash as a preseason non-roster invitee, Ayson signed a short-term contract with the Texan club on April 27, 2024. She made her professional debut on July 20, coming on as a substitute in an NWSL x Liga MX Femenil Summer Cup defeat to the Kansas City Current. At the end of the season, Ayson and the Dash agreed to a mutual contract termination, giving Ayson the chance to explore opportunities abroad.

On November 29, 2024, Australian A-League club Canberra United FC signed Ayson to a one-year contract. One day later, she made her A-League debut in a 2–1 loss to the Central Coast Mariners. On March 14, 2025, Ayson scored her first A-League goal in a match against Western United FC, but she also later conceded a game-winning own goal that helped Western United beat Canberra 4–3.

Following the expiration of her contract with Canberra, Ayson signed with fellow Australian club Sydney FC in August 2025. She tallied her first club goal in Sydney FC's first match of the season, opening the scoring with a header against Melbourne City FC on 31 October. On June 16, 2026, Sydney FC announced that Ayson would be departing from the club after one season.

Ayson spent the A-League offseason back in the United States with her former team, the California Storm. She helped the Storm win the Women's Premier Soccer League west region title for the third year in a row. In September 2026, Ayson signed a one-year contract with another former club of hers, Canberra United FC.

== International career ==
Ayson's family traces back to the Ilocos Sur region of the Philippines, making Ayson eligible to represent the United States or the Philippines internationally. She received her first international call-up with the Filipinas on March 26, 2025, ahead of two April friendlies against the United Arab Emirates.

== Career statistics ==
=== Club ===
As of June 16, 2026

Appearances and goals by club, season and competition
Club	Season	League			Cup		Playoffs (Note: Includes NWSL Playoffs and A-League Finals Series)		Other		Total	
Club	Season	Division	Apps	Goals	Apps	Goals	Apps	Goals	Apps	Goals	Apps	Goals
Houston Dash	2024	NWSL	1	0	—		—		2 (Note: Includes NWSL x Liga MX Femenil Summer Cup)	0	3	0
Canberra United FC	2024–25	A-League	14	2	—		—		—		14	2
Sydney FC	2025–26	A-League	14	1	—		—		—		14	1
Career total			29	3	0	0	0	0	2	0	31	3

== Honors ==
Stanford Cardinal

- NCAA Division I women's soccer championship: 2019
- Pac-12 Championship: 2019, 2022
