= Whitney High School (Rocklin, California) =

Location
- 701 Wildcat Boulevard; Rocklin, Placer, California 95675; United States; 38.8364°N 121.2884°W

Information
- Motto: Claws Up, Buddies!
- Established: 2003 (opened in August 2005)
- School district: Rocklin Unified
- Superintendent: Roger Stock
- Principal: Scott Collins
- Teaching staff: 91.35 (FTE)
- Grades: 9-12
- Enrollment: 1,984 (2022-23)
- Student to teacher ratio: 21.72
- Hours in school day: 6 hours 55 minutes (8:45 am – 3:40 pm)
- Classrooms: 65
- Colors: Maroon and Vegas Gold
- Mascot: Wildcat
- Rival: Rocklin High School
- Newspaper: The Roar
- Yearbook: Details
- Feeder schools: Granite Oaks Middle School; Spring View Middle School
- Website: whs.rocklinusd.org

Whitney High School is a public school located in the southern Placer County city of Rocklin, California, a settlement in the northern Sacramento metropolitan area. Whitney is one of two high schools in Rocklin Unified School District; its counterpart is Rocklin High School. The school is the district's newest educational facility, having opened in 2005 to freshmen and sophomores; Whitney's first freshmen graduated at the end of the 2008–09 school year. That same school year, Whitney was recognized as a California Distinguished School.

The school educates its students using a modified block schedule program that alternates four periods every two days. Students are subject to eight different periods in total. Students at the school are also taught through a standard-based essential skills program, where students must demonstrate mastery of all skills deemed necessary in a class before credits can be earned; additionally, students must achieve a grade higher than C by the year's end, as scores lower than C equate to a "No mark", and the course must be retaken. As of the end of the 2009–10 school year, the high school fielded twenty-three clubs, including an award-winning school yearbook (known as Details), a school newspaper (known as the Roar), and an Emmy winning broadcast program (known as Unleashed). Whitney also ran twenty-three sports teams as of the 2008–09 school year; the football and girls' soccer teams were champions at the 2009 Sac-Joaquin Section Championships for the respective sports.

== History ==
Whitney's name was a significant subject of debate, as the school's first two proposed names were associated too closely with other schools in the area. The school was initially designated Granite Ridge High School, which was deemed too similar to RUSD's Granite Oaks Middle School. It was then designated as Liberty High School, but the name was associated with the rival Lincoln High School. Rocklin Unified School District finally decided on "Whitney" in honor of Joel Parker Whitney, the man who suggested that his successful Boston businessman father, George Whitney, invest in the 1854 development of Placer County, which was then a major locale for gold-seeking Argonauts. George Whitney would later found and develop the city of Rocklin. Additional debate revolved around the school's mascot and colors; deliberation around data collected via survey from the city of Rocklin and other Rocklin Unified School District entities ultimately convinced the district administration to choose the wildcat and the colors of maroon and gold. Construction began in October 2003 with preliminary site work and underground utilities; construction of the buildings started in April 2004.

The high school opened its doors to over 721 ninth and tenth grade students on August 22, 2005, while still partially under construction. Its opening relieved the strain of overcrowding that had previously affected Rocklin High School.

Whitney was recognized as a California Distinguished institution on April 1, 2009, four years after its opening in 2005; the school was noted for this achievement, and is one of six in Placer County to merit the title. On May 19, 2009, Whitney and other recently designated California Distinguished Schools were congratulated in a ceremony in Anaheim.

Three petitions were issued by local charter school Rocklin Academy to found a 7–12 grade charter school called Western Sierra Collegiate Academy in 2008 and base it on the grounds of either Whitney or Rocklin High School. Rocklin Unified School District denied the school its facilities in its first two attempts, although the academy secured a location where Rocklin's Sierra Christian Academy once operated by 2009.

Whitney teacher Matthew Yamamoto was arrested in September 2012 on suspicion of molesting an underage student. The school district waited two days after the arrest before informing parents. In 2013, Yamamoto pleaded no contest to oral copulation with a minor, attempted sexual intercourse with a minor and sexual penetration with a foreign object on a minor, and pleaded guilty to one felony count of conspiracy to obstruct justice. He received the maximum sentence of five years in prison, in light of his violation of a restraining order during the investigation.

=== Facility ===
The 50-acre (200,000 m^{2}) campus was designed to accommodate 1800 students and 175 employees. The area that Whitney's thirteen campus buildings occupy total approximately 200,000 square feet (19,000 m^{2}) and includes a total of 65 classrooms, while Whitney's sports fields encompass 20 acres (81,000 m^{2}) of hard court and grass athletic areas. Of all structures on the campus, the theatre was amongst the last to be completed; construction was finished the following January. In all, the school's construction cost $82 million.

Excluding Whitney's sports fields, the school's outdoor facilities are composed of a number of circular gathering areas (including an amphitheatre) that were designed for use during lunch hour and for outdoor class excursions. In addition, Whitney's class campus structures have private workspaces for the teaching faculty from which each of the structure's classrooms branch off.

== Academic curriculum ==
In accordance with recommendations made by the California's Department of Education, Rocklin Unified School District students are taught using a standards-based curriculum; each student much fulfill a set of essential skills before they are allowed to pass the class. The program is initially implemented in district elementary schools. For some classes, like English, essential skills may be demonstrated by receiving a passing grade on assigned essays or tests. In classes like mathematics, Essential Skills must be demonstrated by receiving a passing grade in specific skills on cumulative tests. In addition, WHS policy does not allow F or D grades. Any grade below a grade of C is considered a No Mark (NM) or a No Credit (NC); the class must then be repeated to get a passing grade. This plan attempts to prepare students for the California High School Exit Exam, or CAHSEE test, which they are expected to pass prior to graduation; CAHSEE is provided to students during their second year. The test covers grade 6–10 language arts concepts, as well as pre-algebraic and Algebra I mathematics.

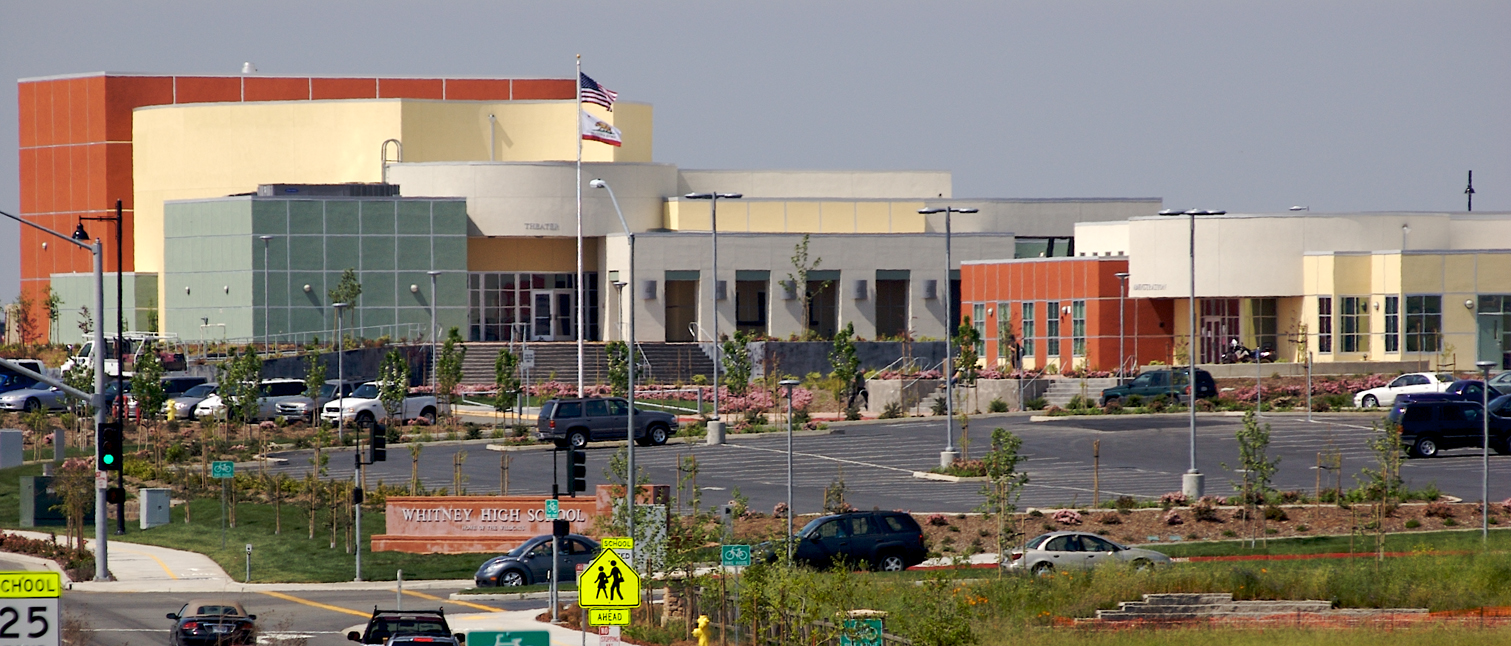
Whitney High School in 2006, as seen from Wildcat Boulevard

Whitney High School offers a college preparatory-based curriculum where students are required to take four years of language arts, three and a half years of social studies, three years of mathematics and science each, three years of physical education, and one year's worth of foreign languages, technology and applied sciences, and visual and performing arts (VAPA). One semester of health education and ten semesters' worth of electives are also mandatory for graduation, in addition to twenty-five hours of completed community service.

Whitney sports fifteen advanced placement classes, ranging from subjects in foreign language and core classes to VAPA electives, such as art.

Each class is managed by one of eleven academic departments. Nine departments will be experienced by students before the end of their senior year, as one or more of their classes are mandatory for graduation. The other two departments are specialized courses; one involves the Culinary Arts, while the other involves a precollegiate form of ROTC. This system of Professional Learning Communities was designed by Illinois's former Adlai E. Stevenson High School principal, Richard Du Four.

Whitney High School runs along the Response to Intervention guideline; the RTI model implements a three-tiered research-based plan to catch students who are struggling in their schooling. The model implements a number of measures intended to assist students, including an intervention period, an AVID program, night and summer school programs, and Section 504 plans. Among the programs, the intervention periods are twenty minutes set before lunch that is intended for students who need to fulfill the academic requirements in which they are lacking. The AVID program pertains to students who are socially or economically disadvantaged.

Whitney students undergo a full eight-class period school day extended over two individual days in a modified block schedule. Each year, as a result, students complete eight classes. Of the 320 possible credits, 250 credits are required for graduation.

At the end of the 2007–2008 school year, 48.6% of Whitney's graduating seniors were qualified for entry into a University of California or California State University campus; 39.6% were accepted into four-year institutions. 12% of the graduating class motioned directly for employment or joined the US military.

== Demographics ==
1,438 students attended Whitney High School during the 2007–08 school year; of these students, there were 361 freshmen, 424 sophomores, 355 juniors, and 298 seniors. The student body is predominantly Caucasian (70.51%), where the largest minorities represented are Hispanics (9.18%) and Asians (5.35%). 9.6% of the school's students marked their race as either "mixed" or did not respond at all. 14% of the student body reported themselves socio-economically disadvantaged, 8% reported themselves as having a disability, and 3% of the school population reported themselves as ESL students. 96.1% of the Whitney student body graduated in its first school year; in the 2005–06 school year, every student passed the requirements for graduation. The school's first dropout students were in the 2006–07 school year; 1.5% of the school's students were part of that group.

Class sizes had increased in all core classes between the school's founding in 2005 and the School Accountability Report Card for the 2007–08 school year, where an average 23.1 English class size and an average 21.9 mathematics class size had increased to, respectively, average class sizes of 25.4 and 25.0.

== Extracurricular activities ==
=== Clubs and publications ===
These clubs, including those pertaining to art, dance, music (the school's band and orchestra), foreign language, and the United States Air Force Junior Reserve Officers' Training Corps, directly correspond to official classes that are run by the school itself. Others, including the California Scholarship Federation and National Honor Society, can be used as catalysts to fulfill the community service graduation requirement. The high school's yearbook, known as Details, was awarded a Silver Crown Award at the 2009 Scholastic Awards Convention at Columbia University alongside Rocklin High School's yearbook; in addition, Whitney's yearbook placed first in the 2006 National Student Press Association Best-of-Show's Yearbook length 1–224 pages category. The school's newspaper, known as The Roar, was founded in the spring of 2005 by the school's Journalism I course; the first issue was released in March of the following year.

=== Sports ===
Whitney High School fields eleven boys' sports teams and twelve girls' sports teams. Nearly all sports have teams of both genders, although exceptions do exist: baseball and football are specific to males, while cheerleading, drill team, softball, and team tennis are specific to females. Whitney's sports teams participate in the Pioneer Valley League, which includes six other high schools in El Dorado County, Placer County, Nevada County, and Sacramento County. Whitney's football team won the Sac-Joaquin Section championships in 2008; they were runners-up to Oakdale High School the previous year and reached the championships again in 2009. Likewise, the girls' soccer team won the Sac-Joaquin Section championships in 2009. Nazir Rasooli was the champion of the 2009 Sac-Joaquin Section Wrestling Championship, and was the first Whitney wrestler to qualify for the State championship.
