= Placer County Transit =

Operator of mass transportation in California

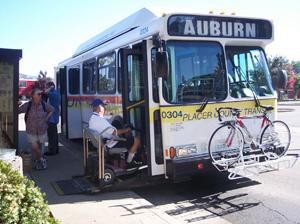
- Parent: Placer County
- Headquarters: 11432 F Ave
- Locale: Auburn, California
- Service area: Placer County, California
- Service type: bus service
- Routes: 8 (6 local, 1 school, 1 commuter)
- Fuel type: Diesel
- Website: Placer County Transit

Placer County Transit is the operator of mass transportation for western Placer County, California, excluding the city of Roseville, which has its own public transit system. In addition to six local routes, Placer County Transit also operates the Lincoln School Tripper in Lincoln, California, a bus supplement during school days, and the Placer Commuter Express, a commuter bus service between Downtown Sacramento and the Colfax Amtrak station. In addition to their fixed route service, Placer County Transit also operates Dial-a-ride services in local communities.

On July 1, 2015, Placer County Transit took over operations from Lincoln's fixed-route and Dial-a-ride bus network, Lincoln Transit.

== Route list ==
All of Placer County Transit's routes operate Monday-Saturday, with the exceptions of Route 40, Placer Commuter Express (which run weekdays only) and Lincoln School Tripper (which runs on school days). There is no service on Sundays and holidays.

- Route 10 - Auburn to Light Rail
  - Serves Auburn Station, Sierra College, Westfield Galleria at Roseville, Louis Orlando Transit Center and Watt/I-80 light rail station
- Route 20 - Lincoln/Rocklin/Sierra College
  - Serves Thunder Valley Casino, Westfield Galleria at Roseville and Sierra College
- Route 30 - Highway 49
- Route 40 - Colfax/Alta
- Route 50 - Taylor Road Shuttle
  - Serves the Dial-a-ride zone between Sierra College and Auburn Station
- Route 70 - Lincoln Circulator
- Lincoln School Tripper
- Placer Commuter Express
  - Runs two times in the morning toward Downtown Sacramento and two times in the evening toward Roseville, Rocklin, Loomis, Penryn, Auburn, Clipper Gap and Colfax

== See also ==
- Roseville Transit
- Sacramento Regional Transit District
