= Cian Slone =

American football player (born 2002)

No. 48 – Las Vegas Raiders
- Position: Defensive end
- Roster status: Practice squad

Personal information
- Born: September 19, 2002 (age 24); Rocklin, California, U.S.
- Listed height: 6 ft 3 in (1.91 m)
- Listed weight: 239 lb (108 kg)

Career information
- High school: Rocklin (Rocklin, California)
- College: American River (2021–2022); Utah State (2023–2024); NC State (2025)
- NFL draft: 2026: undrafted

Career history
- Las Vegas Raiders (2026–present)

Awards and highlights
- Second-team All-MW (2024)
- Stats at Pro Football Reference

Cian Slone (born September 19, 2002) is an American professional football defensive end for the Las Vegas Raiders of the National Football League (NFL). He previously played college football for the Utah States Aggies and the NC State Wolfpack.

== Early life ==
Slone grew up in Rocklin, California and attended Rocklin High School. During his junior season, he recorded 77 tackles, six sacks, 8.5 tackles for loss, an interception and a fumble recovery. His senior season was cut short due to an injury.

He committed to play college football at American River College.

== College career ==
=== American River JC ===
During the 2021 season, Slone recorded 39 tackles as a freshman including 0.5 sacks and 1.5 tackles for loss and a pass breakup.

During the 2022 season, he played in 11 games and earned California Community College Football Coaches Association All-American honors and was named as the state's Defensive MVP. He recorded 84 tackles, 12 sacks and 22 tackles for loss.

=== Utah State ===
Slone would commit to Utah State.

During the 2023 season, he played in all 13 games with six starts, finishing the season with 28 tackles including two sacks and 6.5 tackles for loss. He also recorded seven quarterback hurries, four pass breakup and one fumble recovery.

During the 2024 season, he played in all 12 games and started the final eight games. He finished the season with 49 tackles, the most on the team by a defensive lineman, along with 7.5 sacks, 9.5 tackles for loss and five quarterback hurries. He would earn second team All-Mountain West honors.

On January 7, 2025, Slone announced that he would enter the transfer portal.

=== NC State ===
On April 5, 2025, Slone announced that he would transfer to NC State.

During the 2025 season, he played in and started all 13 games, recording 61 tackles, 6.5 tackles for loss, 1.5 sacks, one interception and a fumble recovery.

He was invited to the 2026 Senior Bowl.

== Professional career ==
Pre-draft measurables
| Height | Weight | Arm length | Hand span | Wingspan | 40-yard dash | 10-yard split | 20-yard split | 20-yard shuttle | Three-cone drill | Vertical jump | Broad jump | Bench press |
|---|---|---|---|---|---|---|---|---|---|---|---|---|
| 6 ft 3 1/8 in (1.91 m) | 241 lb (109 kg) | 33 3/8 in (0.85 m) | 9 3/4 in (0.25 m) | 6 ft 6 1/4 in (1.99 m) | 4.69 s | 1.56 s | 2.66 s | 4.35 s | 6.99 s | 35.5 in (0.90 m) | 10 ft 1 in (3.07 m) | 26 reps |
All values from Pro Day

Slone signed with the Las Vegas Raiders as an undrafted free agent on April 30, 2026. Slone was waived by Las Vegas as a part of final roster cuts on August 30; he was re-signed to the team's practice squad the following day.
