= Valley View Acres, Sacramento, California =

Rural neighborhood of Sacramento

Coordinates: 38.6682°N 121.4842°W

Valley View Acres is a neighborhood located within the city of Sacramento, California. The neighborhood is located south of East Levee Road, north of Sotnip Road/Del Paso Road, west of Steelhead Creek and UEDA Parkway, and east of Sorento Road.

Due to the area's rural nature, Valley View Acres is one of the only parts of the city of Sacramento where the keeping of livestock is allowed.
