= Dry Creek (Steelhead Creek tributary) =

Stream in Placer County, California, USA

Dry Creek (formerly called Linda Creek) is a 15-mile (24 km) long stream in Placer County, California, tributary to the Sacramento River via Steelhead Creek. Its watershed lies within the Sacramento Valley. Because suburban development borders much of its length, the stream is noted for its capacity to cause local flooding and as a recreational attraction.

== Route ==
=== Placer County ===
The Dry Creek watershed headwaters are in western Placer County, in the foothills of Sierra Nevada. A number of smaller streams meet in Roseville, and the combined stream is called Dry Creek starting from the confluence of Antelope Creek and Miners Ravine. Dry Creek flows first southwest through Royer Park in downtown Roseville. Then it meets Cirby Creek and continues west across a Union Pacific railyard, past a City of Roseville wastewater treatment plant, into unincorporated Placer County, and then southwest again toward Sacramento.

=== Sacramento County ===
After crossing into Sacramento County, Dry Creek flows south-southwest between Gibson Ranch County Park (to the west) and the city of Antelope (to the east). Then it flows southwest through the community of Rio Linda, mostly split into two parallel branches that enclose a long narrow strip of land called Cherry Island. Finally, Dry Creek enters the City of Sacramento northwest of Robla, flows west-southwest (forming a small delta) and merges with Steelhead Creek (Natomas East Main Drainage Canal). Steelhead Creek flows south into Discovery Park in American River Parkway and then west (parallel with American River) into Sacramento River.

=== Tributaries ===
Dry Creek tributaries include:

- Antelope Creek
  - Clover Valley Creek
- Miners Ravine
  - Secret Ravine
    - Boardman Canal
    - Sucker Ravine
  - False Ravine
  - Whites Ravine
- Cirby Creek
  - Linda Creek
    - Strap Ravine
    - Swan Stream
- Goat Creek (a.k.a. Sierra Creek)

== Environmental conditions in the Roseville area ==
Historically Dry Creek and its tributaries have supported anadromous fish. In the Dry Creek watershed four insecticides (DDT, aldrin, heptachlor, and dieldrin, were used extensively for soil insect control between 1945 and 1965; certain residues of these chemical persist in upper soils of some of the upper Dry Creek watershed. In addition there have been instances of subsurface fuel releases.

38.6643477°N 121.4766217°W

== See also ==
- Anadromous
