= Davis Yard =

Union Pacific railcar storage site in Roseville, CA

Coordinates: 38°43′53.101″N 121°18′34.499″W

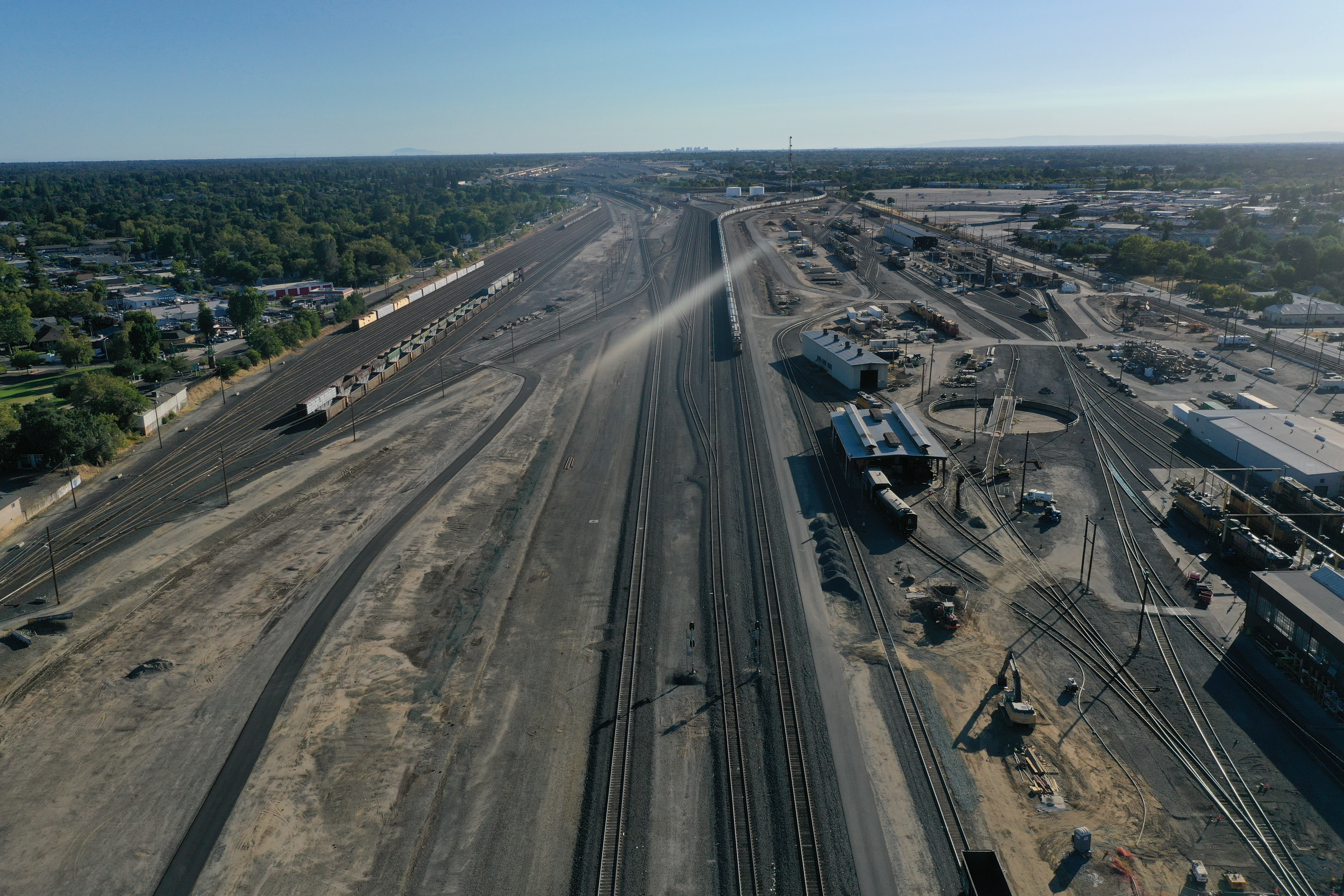
J.R. Davis Yard looking southwest, c. 2019

J.R. Davis Yard is a railway hump yard in Roseville, California owned by the Union Pacific Railroad Company. It is located along the confluence of three of the railroad's lines: the Martinez Subdivision heading southwest to the San Francisco Bay Area, the Roseville Subdivision which runs over the Sierra Nevada Mountains into Nevada, and the Sacramento Subdivision which provides access to the Central Valley, north and south. The yard is named for the last president of the Southern Pacific Transportation Company, Jerry R. Davis.

The yard covers 780 acres (320 ha), with a bypass for passenger trains on the north side. It is capable of handling 2,000 cars per day. It is also used to store Union Pacific's snow removal fleet which work the Sierra Nevada.

== History ==
With the increase in rail traffic at the beginning of the 20th century, about five passenger and ten freight trains ran daily in each direction on the single-track connection between California and Utah. In order to increase capacity by means of longer trains, the sidings on the mountain route to Truckee had to be extended with work beginning in 1906. As part of this, the SP moved the railway depot at the foot of the Sierra Nevada from Rocklin to Roseville, where a large marshaling yard was also built. At the Roseville Yard, the long trains coming from Sacramento could be split up for the climb into the mountains or assembled into longer trains in the opposite direction over the flat Sacramento Valley.

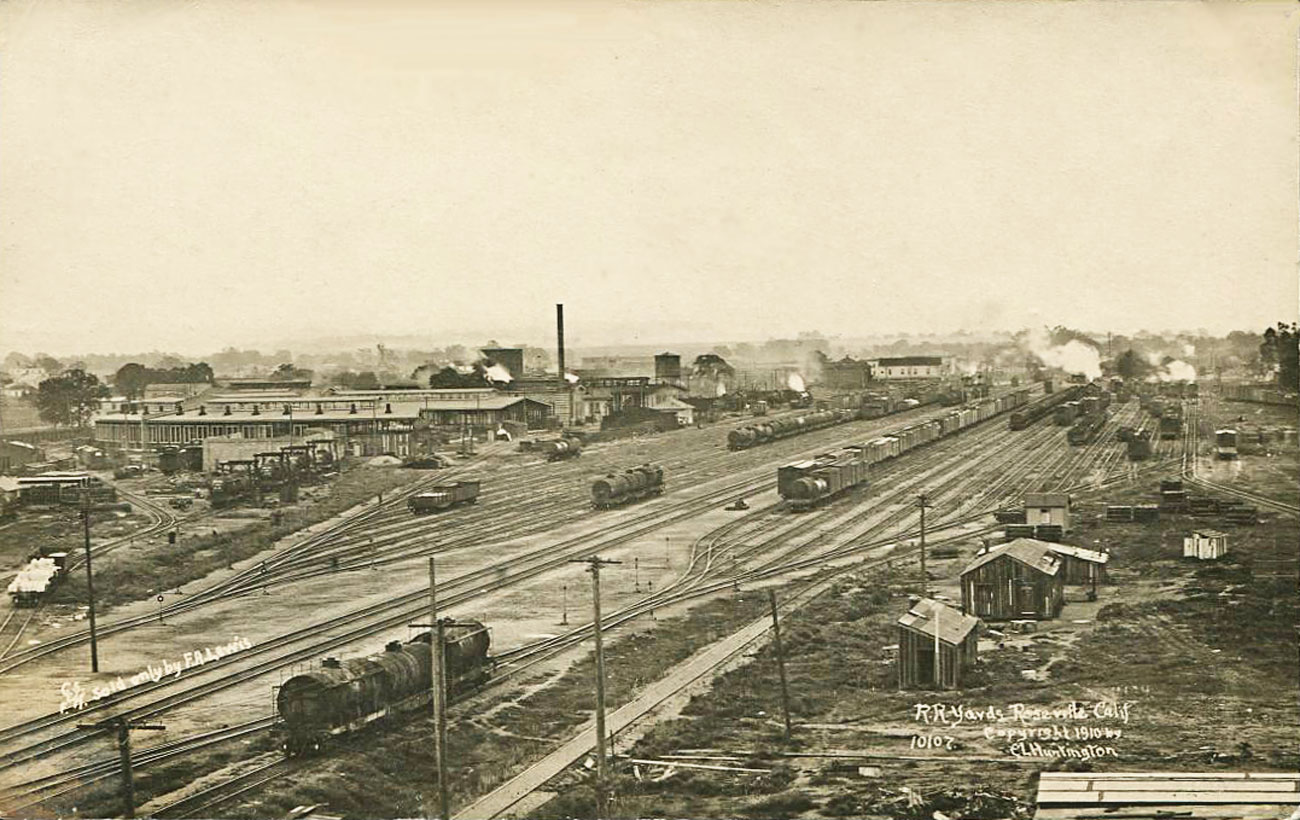
Southern Pacific's Roseville Yards, 1910

By 1910, railway facilities with over 50 miles (80 km) of track and two roundhouses (one rebuilt from the former dismantled roundhouse at Rocklin) for 32 steam locomotives each, as well as other buildings and facilities, had been built southwest of Roseville. This included an ice factory belonging to the refrigerator car operator Pacific Fruit Express, founded jointly by the SP and Union Pacific. This was built at the marshaling yard in 1907 and later expanded into the world's largest production facility for block ice. With a daily production capacity of 400 short tons (360 t) and a storage capacity of 30,000 short tons (27,000 t), over 250 railway refrigerated wagons could be stocked here around the clock in the 1920s; the facility existed until the mid-1970s.

The Roseville Yard was instrumental in the development of Roseville, whose population had risen to over 6,000 by the end of the 1920s. At that time, Southern Pacific employed over 1,200 people at its extensive railroad depots. SP's freight traffic became increasingly important, and its share of the railroad's revenue rose from 67% to 81% between 1921 and 1940, with the line from Roseville to Ogden in Utah being the busiest; however, the flow of goods to the east outweighed that to California. In the early 1950s, SP modernized Roseville Yard and built an automated flat station with consecutive track fields in the direction of the main direction of freight traffic, which was divided from southwest to northeast into an inbound group with 21 tracks, a directional harp with 49 tracks, and an outbound group with 21 tracks. This was called Jennings Yard. The roundhouse for the steam locomotives at the northern end of the exit group was replaced by a maintenance hall (rectangular shed) for diesel locomotives by the early 1960s.

The yard's use greatly diminished by 1992. When Southern Pacific merged with the Union Pacific Railroad, they sought to consolidate operations in Northern California and Jennings Yard was selected to be largely rebuilt. It was renamed Davis Yard in 1998 and opened in May of the following year. Construction of the yard unearthed several pieces of undetonated bombs from a Vietnam War-era derailment of munitions which was hurriedly covered up by SP at the time. The new yard features Dowty retarders and several tracks which can hold up to eighty cars. The servicing facilities remained largely untouched.

=== 1973 Roseville Yard Disaster ===
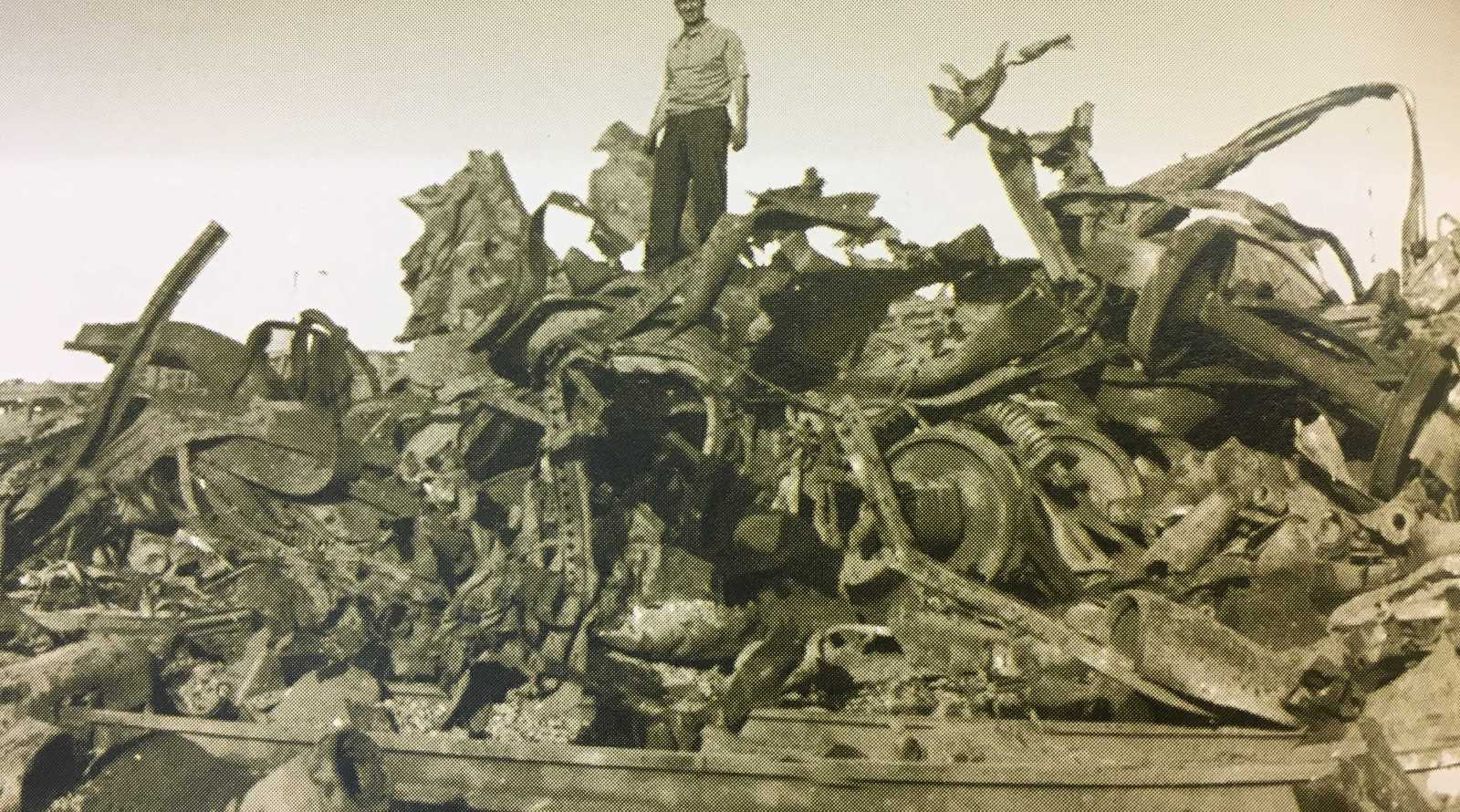
A damage rail car from the explosions.

On April 28, 1973, at 8:03 A.M., a box car on a Southern Pacific freight train carrying approximately 6,000 or 7,000 MK-81 bombs for the Vietnam War caught fire and ignited the bombs inside, causing a chain reaction of explosions throughout the yard. The train was Southern Pacific no. 9917 east; the bombs originated from the Hawthorne Naval Ammunition Depot in Hawthorne, Nevada. No one was killed in the incident but approximately 350 people were injured, the incident resulted in the damage of 169 freight cars, damage to 98 more, and one locomotive. Additionally, approximately 5,500 structures, mostly residential, were damaged, with 9 out of 32 buildings in Antelope, California completely destroyed. 11 houses heavily damaged, 12 slightly damaged. The financial cost of these damages were estimated to be $23 million (in 1973 dollars), according to the Citrus Heights Historical Society. The incident was a major event in both Roseville and Antelope's history and the towns have since then mostly recovered.

== See also ==
- Roseville station (Amtrak)
- 1973 Roseville Yard Disaster
