= Chase Baker =

American gridiron football player (born 1988)

NFL Academy
- Title: Defensive line coach

Personal information
- Born: May 21, 1988 (age 38); Rocklin, California, U.S.
- Listed height: 6 ft 2 in (1.88 m)
- Listed weight: 300 lb (136 kg)

Career information
- High school: Rocklin (CA)
- College: Boise State
- NFL draft: 2012: undrafted

Career history

Playing
- Minnesota Vikings (2012–2013); Ottawa RedBlacks (2015)*
- * Offseason or practice squad member only

Coaching
- NFL Academy (2023 – Current) Defensive Line Coach; Barcelona Dragons (2022 – 2023) Defensive Line Coach; Fan Controlled Football (2020 – 2021) Master Defensive Line Coach

Career NFL statistics
- Tackles: 4
- Stats at Pro Football Reference

Chase Baker (born May 21, 1988) is an American coach and former football defensive tackle. He played for the Minnesota Vikings of the National Football League (NFL). Since 2023, he has been the defensive line coach for the NFL Academy in Loughborough, UK. He was selected for the Tampa Bay Buccaneers National Coaching Academy in 2025.

== College career ==
Baker played college football at Boise State where he was a 3-year starter. He finished his career with 100 tackles, 6.5 sacks, and 13 TFLs. As part of the 2007 Boise State recruiting class, they accumulated a record of 50-3 and are considered the "Winningest Class in NCAA History." Baker received his bachelor's degree in Business Administration and Management.

In 2018, Baker graduated from Southern Methodist University with a Master's in Sport Management.

== Professional career ==
=== Minnesota Vikings ===
After being signed by the Minnesota Vikings of the National Football League in 2012, he was subsequently cut as the Vikings reduced their roster to 53 players. He was added to the practice squad the next day, where he spent the remainder of the 2012 season. In 2013, Baker made the 53-man roster, and played in 5 games for the Vikings, contributing 2 tackles and 2 assisted tackles. In his two seasons with the Vikings, Baker primarily contributed on special teams and as a backup defensive tackle.

=== Ottawa RedBlacks ===
On April 7, 2015, Baker signed with the Ottawa RedBlacks of the Canadian Football League. By signing with Ottawa Baker joined three of his college teammates, Jerrell Gavins, Brandyn Thompson and Jon Gott.

== Coaching career ==
Fan Controlled Football hired Baker to coach the defensive line for the entire league during their inaugural 2021 season.

The Barcelona Dragons announced on January 11, 2022, his hire for the defensive line position.

Prior to Baker's coaching career, he was selected by the Minnesota Vikings and San Francisco 49ers for the Nunn-Wooten Scouting Fellowship in 2016.
