= Roseville Transit =

- Parent: City of Roseville
- Headquarters: 401 Vernon Street
- Locale: Roseville, California
- Service area: Placer County, California
- Service type: Local, Commuter, On-Demand, Paratransit, Game-Day Express
- Fuel type: Diesel
- Website: Roseville Transit

Roseville Transit is the operator of mass transportation in Roseville, California. Ten local routes provide intracity service six days per week. Commuter service is also provided during weekday rush hours, connecting the city with Downtown Sacramento. Roseville Transit operates local, commuter, on-demand, paratransit, and game-day express service.

== Route list ==
=== Local ===
Roseville Transit operates 10 local routes as of August 2022.

Route	Terminals		Description
A	Louis Orlando Transit Center	Galleria Transfer Point	Louis Orlando, Civic Center, Galleria, Sierra Gardens
B	Civic Center Transfer Point	Sierra Gardens Transfer Point	Civic Center, Louis Orlando, Sierra Gardens, Galleria
C	Sierra Gardens Transfer Point	Sunrise at Cirby	Rocky Ridge, Cirby, Sunrise, Sierra Gardens
D	Civic Center Transfer Point		Civic Center, Junction, Woodcreek Oaks, Blue Oaks, Foothills
E	Sierra Gardens Transfer Point	Rocklin Rd. past El Don	Sierra College Campus, Galleria Mall, Sierra Gardens
F	Sierra Gardens Transfer Point	Cirby at Sunrise	Sierra Gardens, Sunrise, Cirby, Rocky Ridge
L	Civic Center Transfer Point	Sierra College Blvd. at Douglas	Civic Center, Harding, Lead Hill, Douglas, Sierra College Blvd.
M	Galleria Transfer Point	Pleasant Grove past Village Plaza	Galleria, Fairway, Pleasant Grove, West Park
R	Louis Orlando Transit Center	Foothills at PRIDE Industries	Louis Orlando, Foothills Blvd.
S	Galleria Transfer Point	Santucci Justice Center	Galleria, Santucci Justice Center

=== Commuter ===
Roseville Transit operates peak-only services to and from Downtown Sacramento on weekdays. As of July 2025, two routes operate in each direction, with each trip assigned a different route number.

=== Game Day Express ===
During home games for the Sacramento Kings regular season, Roseville Transit operates a shuttle service between Civic Center Transfer Point and Sacramento Valley Station. The shuttle runs once in each direction, leaving Roseville 75 minutes before the scheduled start of the game and leaving Sacramento 30 minutes after it ends.

== See also ==
- Placer County Transit
- Sacramento Regional Transit District
