= Logan Webb =

American baseball player (born 1996)

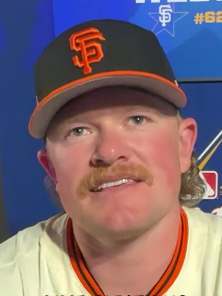
- Webb with the Giants in 2025

San Francisco Giants – No. 62
- Pitcher
- Born: November 18, 1996 (age 30); Rocklin, California, U.S.
- Bats: Right Throws: Right

MLB debut
- August 17, 2019, for the San Francisco Giants

MLB statistics (through 2026 season)
- Win–loss record: 78–62
- Earned run average: 3.50
- Strikeouts: 1,128
- Stats at Baseball Reference

Teams
- San Francisco Giants (2019–present)

Career highlights and awards
- 3× All-Star (2024–2026); Gold Glove Award (2025); NL strikeout leader (2025)
Medals
Men's baseball
Representing United States
World Baseball Classic
Silver medal – second place	2026 Miami	Team

Logan Tyler Webb (born November 18, 1996) is an American professional baseball pitcher for the San Francisco Giants of Major League Baseball (MLB). He was selected by the Giants in the fourth round of the 2014 MLB draft, and made his MLB debut in 2019. Webb was named an All-Star in 2024, 2025 and 2026.

== Early life ==
Logan Tyler Webb was born on November 18, 1996, in Rocklin, California. Webb attended Rocklin High School in Rocklin, California. As a pitcher for the baseball team, he had a 0.49 earned run average (ERA) and struck out 73 batters in 57 2/3 innings pitched in his senior year, earning Sacramento Bee All-Metro and Cal-Hi Sports All-State honors. His fastball reached 96 miles per hour (154 km/h).

== Professional career ==
=== Draft and minor leagues ===
The San Francisco Giants selected Webb in the fourth round of the 2014 Major League Baseball draft. He signed for a signing bonus of $600,000, above the $440,600 designated by Major League Baseball for where he was drafted. He made his professional debut with the Arizona League Giants, pitching four innings, at 17 years of age.

Webb played 2015 with the Salem-Keizer Volcanoes where he compiled a 3–6 record with a 4.92 ERA in 14 starts, and 2016 with the Augusta GreenJackets where he went 2–3 with a 6.21 ERA in nine starts. In 2016, he underwent Tommy John surgery.

Webb returned to Salem-Keizer in 2017, pitching to a 2–0 record with a 2.89 ERA in 28 relief innings pitched, in which he struck out 31 batters. In 2018, Webb pitched for the San Jose Giants and Richmond Flying Squirrels, posting a combined 2–5 record with a 2.41 ERA in 27 games (26 starts). He was named a CAL mid-season All-Star.

The Giants added Webb to their 40-man roster after the season. He began 2019 with Richmond. On May 1, 2019, Webb was suspended for 80 games for testing positive for dehydrochlormethyltestosterone, an anabolic-androgenic steroid. Despite testing positive for the drug, he professed his innocence and confusion. In a formal statement by Webb released by MLB Pipeline, Webb wrote that he had "done research" and submitted "supplements and products for testing" to find out how the dehydrochlormethyltestosterone entered his system, but to no avail. He added, "I know in my heart that something someday will be put into the world to prove my innocence" and "I love this game and respect it too much to ever cheat it". He then apologized for bringing "negative attention" to his "family, friends, teammates, & the San Francisco Giants" and promised to "be back better than ever" after his suspension.

=== San Francisco Giants (2019–present) ===
==== 2019–20 ====
On August 17, 2019, the Giants promoted Webb to the major leagues. He made his major-league debut that night versus the Arizona Diamondbacks, allowing one run while striking out seven batters over five innings. In 2019 in the minor leagues, with four teams he was 2–4 with a 1.85 ERA in 12 games (10 starts) covering 63 1/3 innings and striking out 69 batters. With the Giants in 2019 he was 2–3 with a 5.22 ERA in 8 starts covering 39 2/3 innings and striking out 37 batters. In the pandemic-shortened 2020 season, Webb was 3–4 with a 5.47 ERA and 46 strikeouts in 54 1/3 innings, and tied for the NL lead in HBP with 7.

==== 2021 ====
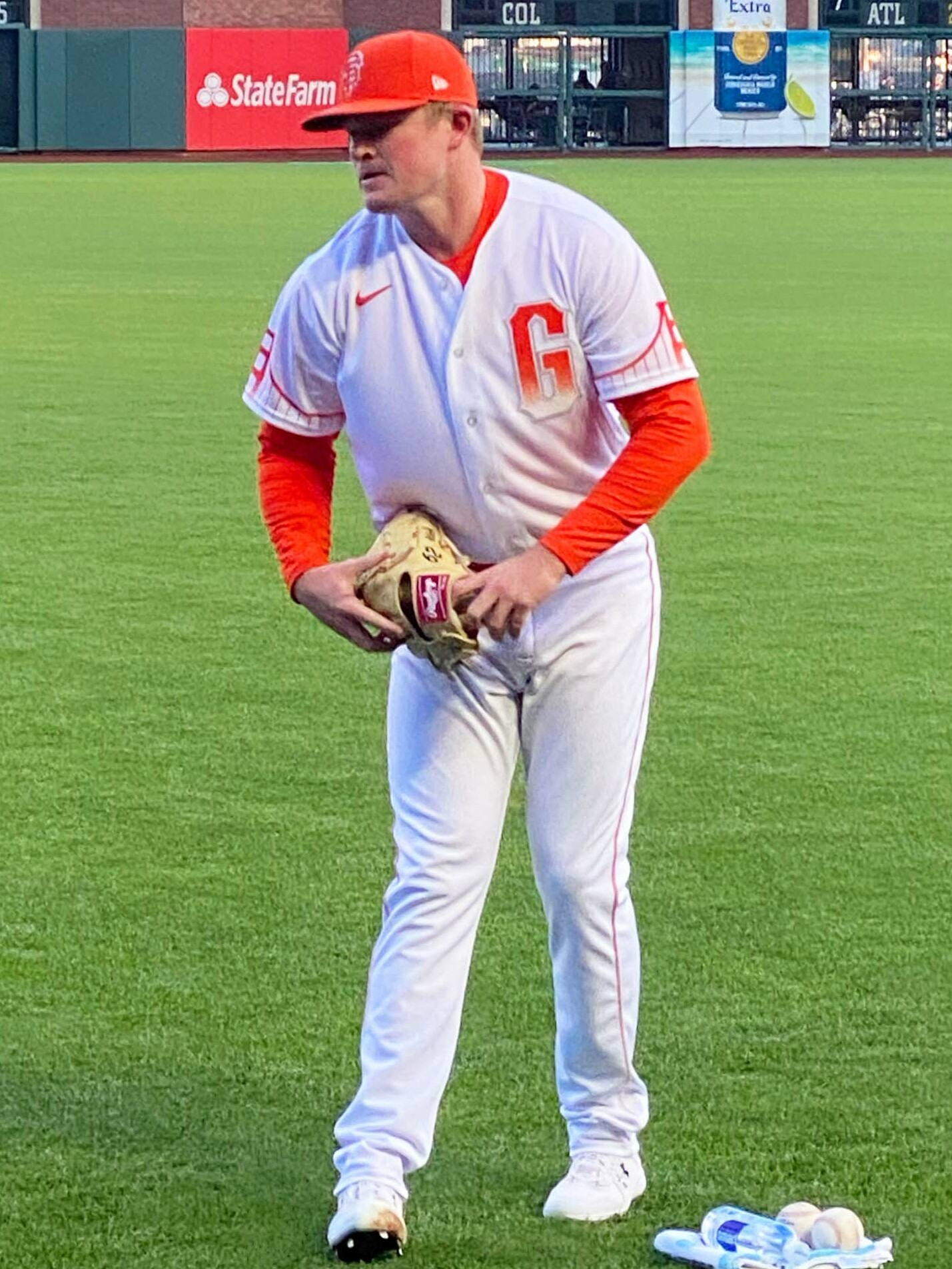
Webb in 2021

In the 2021 regular season, Webb was 11–3 with a 3.03 ERA. In 27 games (26 starts), he had 158 strikeouts in 148 1/3 innings, and averaged 7.8 hits, 2.2 walks, and 9.6 strikeouts per 9 innings. His salary was $583,000. Webb was the starting pitcher in the last game of the season, with the Giants having a one-game lead in the National League West over the Los Angeles Dodgers. He pitched seven innings and hit his first career home run in an 11–4 victory, earning the win. It was the last home run hit by a pitcher before the full-time adoption of the designated hitter by the National League in 2022.

In the playoffs, he pitched 14 2/3 innings, giving up one run and one walk while striking out 17 batters. In Game 1, Webb became the third pitcher in franchise history to pitch 7 2/3 innings, allow no runs, and strike out at least 10 batters in a postseason game, joining Madison Bumgarner (2014) and Tim Lincecum (2010). In Game 5, he joined Bumgarner, Christy Mathewson, Ryan Vogelsong, and Jack Sanford as the only pitchers in franchise history with multiple appearances of seven innings and one earned run or fewer in a single playoff series.

==== 2022 ====
Webb was the Giants' Opening Day starting pitcher for the 2022 regular season. In 32 games (all starts) in 2022, he was 15–9 with a 2.90 ERA. He had 163 strikeouts in 192 1/3 innings, and averaged 8.1 hits, 2.3 walks, 7.6 strikeouts, and only 0.5 home runs allowed per 9 innings. He ranked 5th among National League pitchers in wins, 7th in ERA and innings pitched, second in home runs per 9 innings, and 9th in wins above replacement. Webb was the first Giants pitcher to win 15 or more games in a regular season since Madison Bumgarner and Johnny Cueto both accomplished the feat in 2016. He finished in 11th place in National League Cy Young Award voting.

==== 2023 ====
On January 13, 2023, Webb agreed to a one-year, $4.6 million contract with the Giants for the 2023 season, avoiding salary arbitration. On March 30, 2023, Webb made his second consecutive opening-day start for the Giants. He recorded a career-high 12 strikeouts, breaking Madison Bumgarner's franchise record for most strikeouts by an Opening Day starter.

On April 14, 2023, Webb agreed to a five-year, $90 million contract extension with the Giants.

On July 9, 2023, facing the Colorado Rockies, Webb pitched his first major-league complete game and first shutout. He struck out 10 batters in the game, allowing 7 hits and no walks.

Webb finished 2023 with a 3.25 ERA, 194 strikeouts, and an 11–13 record in 33 starts. His 216.0 innings pitched led both major leagues, while his ERA ranked 4th, and his walks plus hits per inning pitched (WHIP) ranked 2nd among NL pitchers. His 2 complete games also tied him with teammate Alex Cobb for 2nd in the NL.

Webb was named an NL Cy Young Award finalist for 2023 and finished second in the voting to San Diego's Blake Snell. He became the first Giants pitcher to finish in the top three since Tim Lincecum won the second of his two consecutive awards in 2009. He also received an 8th-place vote for NL MVP, finishing in 17th place in MVP voting.

==== 2024 ====
Webb was selected to the 2024 MLB All-Star Game for the National League. At the time of his selection, he had a 3.09 ERA and a National League-leading 119 1/3 innings pitched.

Webb concluded the 2024 MLB season with a National League-leading 204 2/3 innings pitched (IP), making him the first Giants pitcher since National Baseball Hall of Famer Gaylord Perry in 1969 and 1970 to lead the National League in total innings pitched in consecutive seasons. He was third overall behind Logan Gilbert (208 2/3 IP) and Seth Lugo (206 2/3 IP).

==== 2025 ====
Webb was selected to his second consecutive All-Star Game in 2025. At the time of his selection, he had a 2.62 ERA and a Major League-leading 120 1/3 innings pitched. On September 8, Webb pitched six innings, allowed five hits and one earned run, walked two batters, and struck seven batters in a 15-5 victory over the Arizona Diamondbacks. In that game, when he struck out Adrian Del Castillo in the fifth inning, that was his 200th strikeout of the season. With that strikeout, he secured the first 200-strikeout season of his career.

Webb finished the 2025 season with an MLB-leading 34 starts and 207.0 innings pitched, and led the National League with a career-high 224 strikeouts. Webb was the first Giant to lead the National League in strikeouts and innings pitched since Bill Voiselle in 1944. On November 2, 2025, Webb was awarded his first career Gold Glove Award for National League pitchers.

==== 2026 ====
Webb started for the Giants on Opening Day. During the game, he recorded his 1,000th career strikeout against Aaron Judge in the bottom of the fourth inning. On May 9, Webb was placed on the 15-day Injured list with knee bursitis.

== International career ==
On December 1, 2022, Webb was announced as a member of the United States national baseball team for the 2023 World Baseball Classic. However, in February 2023, Webb did not appear on the announced Team USA WBC roster. At a Giants fan event on February 4, Webb declined to answer WBC-related questions. Webb cited a desire to play with the Giants for the duration of their spring training camp as a motivation for his decision to opt out.

In December 2025, Webb was announced as a member of Team USA for the 2026 World Baseball Classic. He made two starts for Team USA in the tournament. In the pool stage, Webb pitched 4.0 innings, allowing 1 earned run, in a 15–5 victory over Brazil. In the quarterfinals, he pitched 4 2/3 scoreless innings in a 5–3 win over Canada.

== Pitching style ==
Webb is a right-handed sinkerballer who primarily relies on a mix of his sinker, slider, and changeup. His pitching repertoire also includes a four-seam fastball, which he throws much less frequently. Webb releases the ball from a sidearm slot that maximizes the unique movement of his pitches. Webb also threw a cutter, which he ditched after 2021. He added it back to his arsenal in the middle of the 2024 season after struggling with pitching to left-handed batters.

== Personal life ==
On December 5, 2021, Webb married his high school sweetheart Sharidan Morales in Sacramento, California. The couple had their first child, a daughter in October 2024. Webb is considered legally blind and was diagnosed with severe astigmatism in third or fourth grade when he had difficulty seeing the ball.

== See also ==
- List of baseball players who underwent Tommy John surgery

Awards
Preceded by Cristopher Sánchez	National League Pitcher of the Month; June 2026	Succeeded by Chris Sale
