= Secret Ravine =

Valley in California, United States

Coordinates: 38°45′34″N 121°15′23″W

Secret Ravine is a perennial tributary of Miners Ravine which shortly thereafter runs into Dry Creek in Placer County, California. Its course lies within the cities of Rocklin, Loomis, and Roseville, as well as unincorporated parts of Placer County. It passes through the campus of Sierra College. Over its entire length the creek runs near the Interstate 80 freeway. It is an area becoming increasingly suburbanized. It was the site of placer mining operations during the California Gold Rush, and areas of tailings remain to this day. Later the drainage was a locale for granite quarrying.

== History ==
The Rocklin Cemetery is very close to the ravine. An old Indian cemetery was farther up the drainage.

In 1869 some laid-off Chinese railroad workers moved to Secret Ravine to mine. They also raised vegetables which they marketed locally. They were driven out during the anti-Chinese pogrom of September 1876. This area is still known as China Gardens.

- Drainage area: 19.7 square miles (51 km^{2})
- Stream length: 10.5 miles (16.9 km)
- Elevation at source: 1,285 feet (392 m)
- Elevation at confluence: 165 feet (50 m)

The Secret Ravine Post Office operated from 1854 to 1868. The U.S. Census for 1860 lists it as the address for Jean Baptiste Charbonneau - mountain man and son of Toussaint Charbonneau and the Lewis and Clark Expedition's guide Sacagawea.

== Parks ==
- Loomis Basin Community Park is off King Road just east of Loomis. The park consists of a North and a South division on each side of Secret Ravine. Giant boulders dot this wooded area.

== Places named for the Secret Ravine tributary ==
- Secret Ravine Parkway, in Roseville
- Secret Ravine Road, in an unincorporated area east of Loomis
- Secret Ravine School, Newcastle, California
- Secret Ravine Vineyard and Winery, in Loomis
- Secret Ravine Way, in Rocklin

NOTE: A second Secret Ravine, also in Placer County, flows into the North Fork of the American River near Colfax. It was alternatively called Robbers Ravine.
