= Antelope Creek (Placer County) =

Tributary of Dry Creek in California, US

Coordinates: 38.7735°N 121.2765°W

Antelope Creek is a tributary of Dry Creek in Placer County, California. The creek is home to spring run Chinook salmon.
