= 1973 Roseville Yard Disaster =

Explosion in Roseville, California

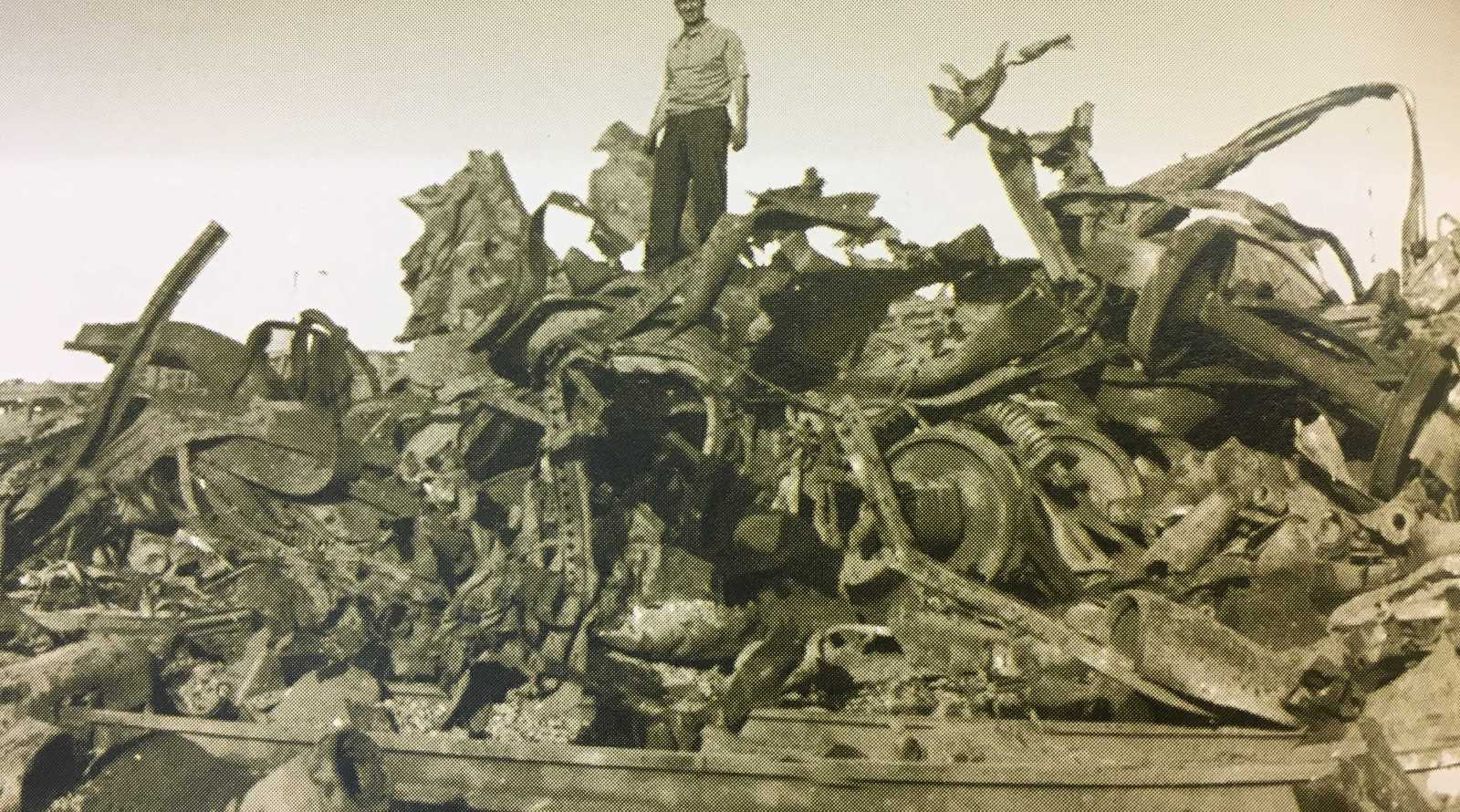
Remains of the box cars after the explosions at the Roseville Yard

The Roseville Yard Disaster was an accidental explosion and fire that occurred on April 28, 1973, in the United States at a major Southern Pacific rail yard in the city of Roseville, California. The shipment of munitions bound for the Vietnam War originated at the Hawthorne Naval Ammunition Depot in Hawthorne, Nevada. Explosions continued for a number of hours and the loudest could be heard as far as 40 miles (64 km) away. There were no fatalities, although 348 people were injured.

== Background ==
The disaster occurred in the Union Pacific's J.R. Davis Yard of the Union Pacific. Formerly known as the Roseville Yard, it is located between Roseville, California, and Antelope, California. The largest yard on the West Coast, it was renamed J.R. Davis Yard in 1999 in honor of a former Union Pacific president.

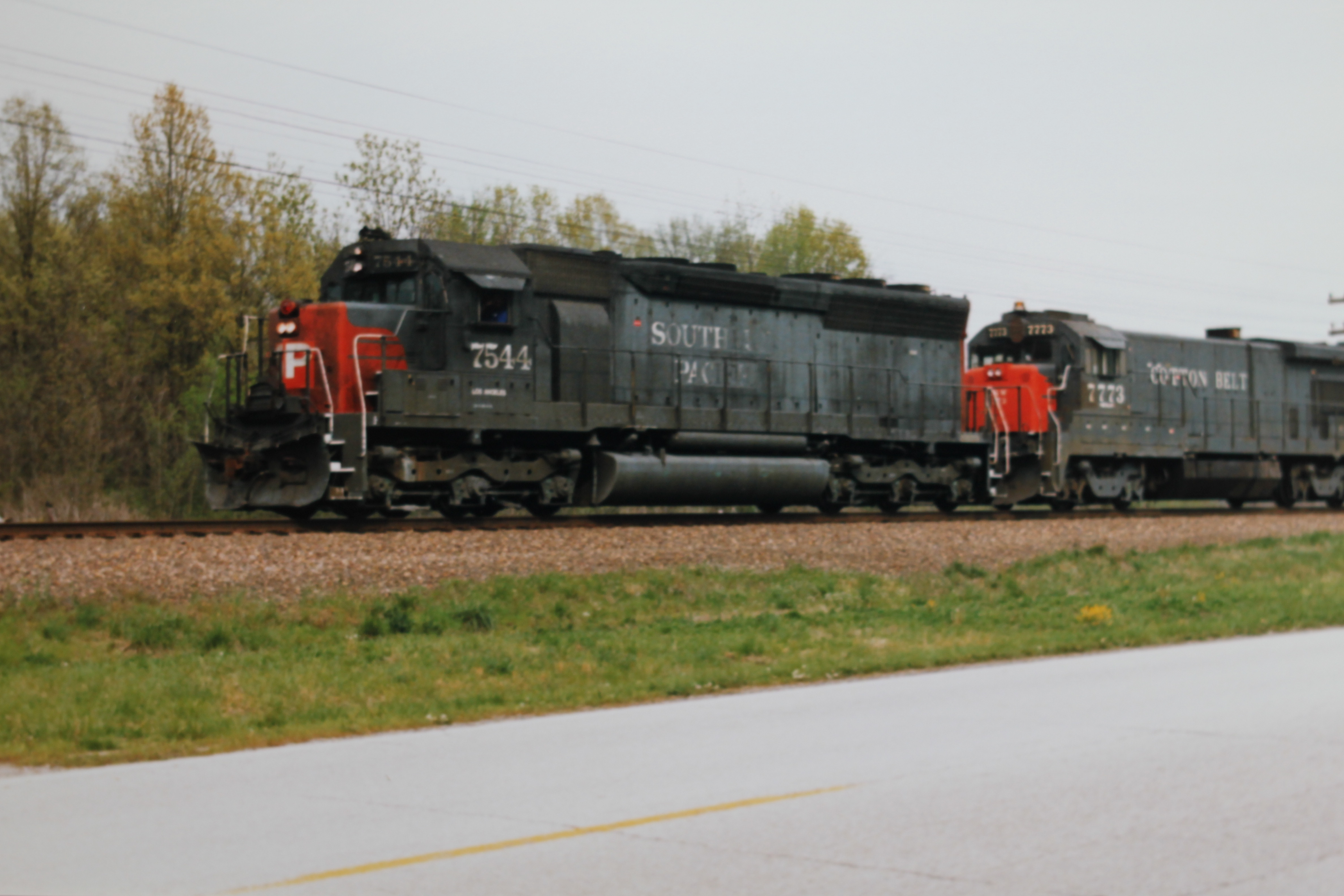
A Southern Pacific EMD SD45 in Gorham, Illinois in 1989.

A Southern Pacific freight train from the Hawthorne Naval Ammunition Depot in Hawthorne, Nevada. was carrying approximately 6,000 or 7,000 Mark 81 bombs filled with Tritonal (TNT/aluminum) from the Naval Ammunition Depot to the ship load-out port facility at the Concord Naval Weapons Station in Concord, California that were bound for the Vietnam War.

The train arrived in Roseville Yard at 6:05 A.M., on April 28, 1973 as a stopping point on the way. At 7:40 A.M. smoke was observed coming out of one of the boxcars loaded with the bombs on the train, and later a crewman in the yard observed a fire on one of the wooden Department of Defense boxcars loaded with the bombs. A small explosion caught the attention of personnel at a fire station located a few hundred yards away. While they were assessing the situation, the boxcar exploded, beginning a chain reaction of explosions. Nine emergency services agencies convened on the site, and approximately 18,000 people from both Roseville, California and Antelope, California were evacuated. Vibrations from the explosions were felt up to 15 miles (24 km) away while explosions were heard up to 40 miles (64 km) away from the gulf to the north to Yuba City, California to the north. In Sacramento, California, the capitol building's dome was closed due to fears that the building would collapse, explosions could also be seen along Interstate 80 which caused people to stop and watch the explosions from there. Major explosions lasted until 10:30 A.M., while smaller explosions lasted until 4:05 P.M. the next day.

== Investigation ==
Subsequent investigation pointed to a small fire in the boxcar that started the explosions caused by overheated brakes. The U.S. military-owned boxcar was part of a train of military boxcars carrying high explosive aircraft ammunition that had just arrived in the yard after descending from the Sierra Nevada into the Roseville Yard. The train had been switched to a Southern Pacific line in Sparks, Nevada, before descending from Donner Summit. Southern Pacific paid out $23 million (in 1973 dollars) for the damages, and the estimated cost to the U.S. Government was $5 million. The explosions completely destroyed the railyard itself. Out of the thirty-two structures, nine were destroyed, eleven were heavily damaged and twelve were slightly damaged in Antelope, California. The Citrus Heights Fire Station Six in Antelope was among the buildings destroyed, and approximately 5,500 structures, primarily residential, were damaged by the blasts. Heavy damage extended to a radius of about 6,800 feet (1.29 miles) from the explosion site, and slight damage occurred up to three miles away. 169 freight cars from the yard were destroyed, and 98 other freight cars and one locomotive were damaged. No one was killed in the incident but 350 people were injured.

According to the California Governor's Office of Emergency Service, "On April 28, 1973, in the Southern Pacific Railroad yard near the Northern California community of Roseville, a bomb detonated in one of the boxcars creating massive explosions, huge plumes of smoke in the air, destroyed buildings and rail sections and dug huge craters in the ground. Over a period of approximately thirty-two hours, eighteen boxcars exploded in succession. The railroad yard was essentially destroyed."

As of 2024, bombs and fragments believed to be from the incident were still being found in the area.

== See also ==
- Davis Yard
