= Rocklin Unified School District =

School district in California, United States

Address
- 2615 Sierra Meadows Drive Rocklin, California, 95677; United States

District information
- Type: Public
- Grades: K–12
- NCES District ID: 0600013

Students and staff
- Students: 11,405
- Teachers: 516.08 (FTE)
- Staff: 494.34 (FTE)
- Student–teacher ratio: 22.1

Other information
- Website: www.rocklinusd.org

The Rocklin Unified School District is a California education district serving the Rocklin area. It consists of twelve elementary schools, two middle schools, two high schools, and the Rocklin Alternative Education Center.

Rocklin Elementary is the oldest school in the district, although its location has changed a few times. Parker Whitney is the oldest school in the district that has maintained same location. The newest school is Quarry Trail Elementary school in the Whitney Ranch area, which opened for students in August 2022.

== History ==
In 2008, a grades 7–12 charter school called Western Sierra Collegiate Academy requested twice of Rocklin Unified School District for permission to use its facilities at either Whitney or Rocklin High School. An August 20 district board meeting, the Rocklin Unified School District's trustees unanimously denied the charter school the permission it sought. Superintendent Kevin Brown backed the district's decision. The administration of the district's charter Rocklin Academy, however, supported the creation of what would be the district's fourth charter school. Rocklin Academy brought the matter to the California Department of Education, which deliberated on 12 March 2009. The academy was approved, and was able to rent space previously occupied by Sierra Christian Academy. This location was chosen due to RUSD's intransigence in providing suitable facilities, the need to begin the 2009/2010 school year, and to stay within budget for facilities rental. Both Rocklin Academy campuses are tenants of Rocklin School District, paying fair market rates for schools that would otherwise be generating debt, rather than revenue. WSCA sought to be a paying tenant as well.

== Elementary schools ==
=== Antelope Creek Elementary School ===
In October 1991, the school's name was approved as Antelope Creek Elementary School by the school board thanks to the Name that School Comimittee, an organization which was tasked with collecting input from the public to determine what the new school should be named. Amongst others, one seriously considered alternative name was 49er Elementary. It opened in August 1992.

=== Breen Elementary School ===
Breen Elementary is a K-6 school located in Rocklin, California. It opened in late August, 1994 with a population of 177 students. As of 2012, its population is approximately 700 and its principal is Chuck Thibideau. As of 2019, principal is Jennifer Palmer.

=== Rocklin Academy (charter school) ===
Rocklin Academy is a charter school sponsored by the Rocklin Unified School District.

=== Rocklin Elementary School ===
This School Opened In 1884, The Principal As Of 2023 is Amanda Markus, This School Goes From Kindergarten All The Way To 6th Grade, it has A Program Called Gifted And Talented, it also has a STP Program too, they also have clubs that kids can attend at the school,

=== Sierra Elementary School ===
Sierra Elementary is an IB school. Sierra, the home of the sharks (their mascot) focuses on enhancing students learning through many different methods.

=== Twin Oaks Elementary School ===
The School Opened in 1999, the Principal As of 2023 is Jamie Iverson Diaz, The School is K-6 and there about 60 Teachers and Staff from K-6

=== Valley View Elementary School ===
Valley View Elementary School's principal as of 2013 is Shari Anderson. It goes from Kindergarten all the way to 6th grade.

== Middle schools ==
=== Granite Oaks Middle School ===
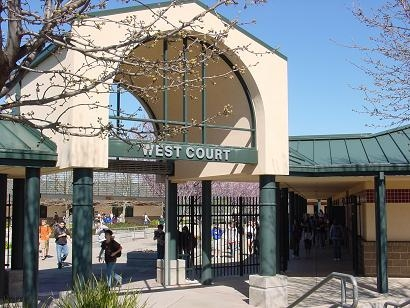
Granite Oaks Middle School

Granite Oaks Middle School is located near the Rocklin High School.

At Granite Oaks, the principal as of the 2024-2025 School Year is Mr. Holmes, and 2 vice principals are Mr. Anaya. and Mrs Duffy, The Academic Performance Index (API) is one of the highest in all of California, according to the California Department of Education.

Granite Oaks Middle School is made up of eight Academies. Each Academy has between two and four teachers. 8th grade academies include Discovery, Quest, Sierra, and Talon. 7th grade academies include Legacy, Odyssey, Key, and Rubicon. It is one of the most advanced schools in the Rocklin Unified School District.

Granite Oaks provides two C-STEM (Computer Science, Technology, Engineering, and Math), for both 7th and 8th grade. Their devoted academies are Rubicon (7th) and Discovery (8th), which operate as a regular academy, but they include more technology in their classrooms.

Granite Oaks also provides a program for Gifted and Talented Education, GATE, which are the Key (7th) and Quest (8th) Academies. These academies offer accelerated courses in Math, with Accelerated Math, for 7th grade, in which they go over Math 7 and 8, and Integrated I in 8th grade. There is an Advanced English course for 8th Grade, and a preparatory course for Rocklin and Whitney High School's respective courses.

=== Spring View Middle School ===
As of August 2022, Spring View Middle School's principal is Danielle Lauer, with Sarah Vickers serving as assistant principal. Spring View's Academic Performance Index (API) is one of the highest in all of California, with academic achievements earning it recognition as a California Distinguished School. In addition, Spring View students have won national recognition in Academic Pentathlon competitions. Its Integrated Math and Spanish Language programs each provide students with the opportunity to earn high school level academic credit prior to entering high school.

Spring View Middle School instructs 7th and 8th grades, with students assigned to core teaching teams designed to concentrate focus on the individual academic and social/emotional needs of each student. Elective choices include Family and Consumer Science, Computer Science, Leadership, Spanish, Chorus, Orchestra, Symphonic and Jazz Bands. Extra-curricular opportunities exist for Art Club, Chess Club, Yearbook, Teen Life (Christian club), California Junior Scholastic Federation, a newly-formed Garden Club initiated by teacher Erin Brady that was featured in local news reports, and an East Coast Tour that encompasses visits to Washington DC, Boston, and New York City. Spring View's athletic teams routinely win championships, with its Wrestling and Boys Basketball teams taking championship rankings in Spring and Winter 2022, respectively.

== High schools ==
- Rocklin High School
- Whitney High School
- Western Sierra Collegiate Academy

== Rocklin Alternative Education Center ==
- Rocklin Independent Charter Academy
- Victory High School
