= Rocklin High School =

Public high school in Rocklin, California

Location
- 5301 Victory Lane; Rocklin, California 95765; United States; 38.81428°N 121.25174°W

Information
- School type: public high school Secondary
- Established: 1993
- School district: Rocklin Unified School District
- Principal: Michael Pappas
- Grades: 9-12
- Enrollment: 1,936 (2024-25)
- Colors: Blue and Silver
- Mascot: Thunder
- Website: rhs.rocklinusd.org

Rocklin High School is a public high school in Rocklin, California, a suburb northeast of Sacramento, California. It is one of three high schools in the Rocklin Unified School District.

== Courses ==
=== Visual and performing arts ===
==== Instrumental music ====
As of 2024, the following music courses are offered and taught by Jeffrey Hayman:

- Concert Band
- Symphonic Band
- Wind Ensemble
- String Orchestra
- Guitar Lab
- Piano Lab
- Jazz Band
- AP Music Theory

==== Choir ====
- Concert Choir (Non-Auditioned SSAA Ensemble open to any Female student at RHS)
- Advanced Women's Ensemble (Auditioned Ensemble open to any female student at RHS)
- Chamber Choir (Auditioned SATB Choral Ensemble)
- Men's Chorale (Non-Auditioned Ensemble open to any RHS male singer)
- Thunder Choir (Combined Choirs performing at concerts and festivals)

==== Theatre ====
Rocklin High School offers four theatre classes: Theatre I is an introductory theatre course. Theatre II/III is an intermediate, two-year course with a curriculum that alternates every other year. Theatre IV is the advanced theatre class. Technical theatre focuses on the "behind-the-scenes" aspect of theatre, including set building. Traditionally, three theatrical productions are performed each year: the Fall Play, the Winter Musical, and the Spring Comedy. The Theatre IV class participates in the Lenaea Festival at California State University, Sacramento.

==== Dance ====
Four levels of Dance classes are offered, and a course in partner (ballroom) dancing. There is a performing Dance Team (previously called "Rhythm in Blue").

== Other achievements ==
Rocklin High has an engineering program. Students used to compete annually in the SkillsUSA competitions, and have earned gold medals at the Regional, State, and National levels.

The 2005–2006 Rocklin High Yearbook placed first in the 2006 NSPA Nashville Convention Best-In-Show for the 325+ page category.

In 2007, Rocklin's theatre four class won eight separate awards at the Lenaea Festival held at California State University, Sacramento. As well in 2025 winning 13 separate awards and Gold placement in both set design and one person monologues.

== Administration ==
Rocklin High School has had five principals since it was established in 1993:

- Phil Spears 1993–2000
- Debra Hawkins 2000–2005
- Michael Garrison 2005–2011
- David Bills 2011–2015
- Davis Stewart 2015-June 2025
- Michael Pappas August 2025-present

== Notable alumni ==
- Madison Ayson - soccer player for Canberra United FC
- Chase Baker - NFL player
- Logan Webb - MLB pitcher for the San Francisco Giants
- Nick Mears - MLB Pitcher for the Kansas City Royals
- Cian Slone – NFL defensive end for the Las Vegas Raiders
