= Roseville, California =

City in California, United States

- City
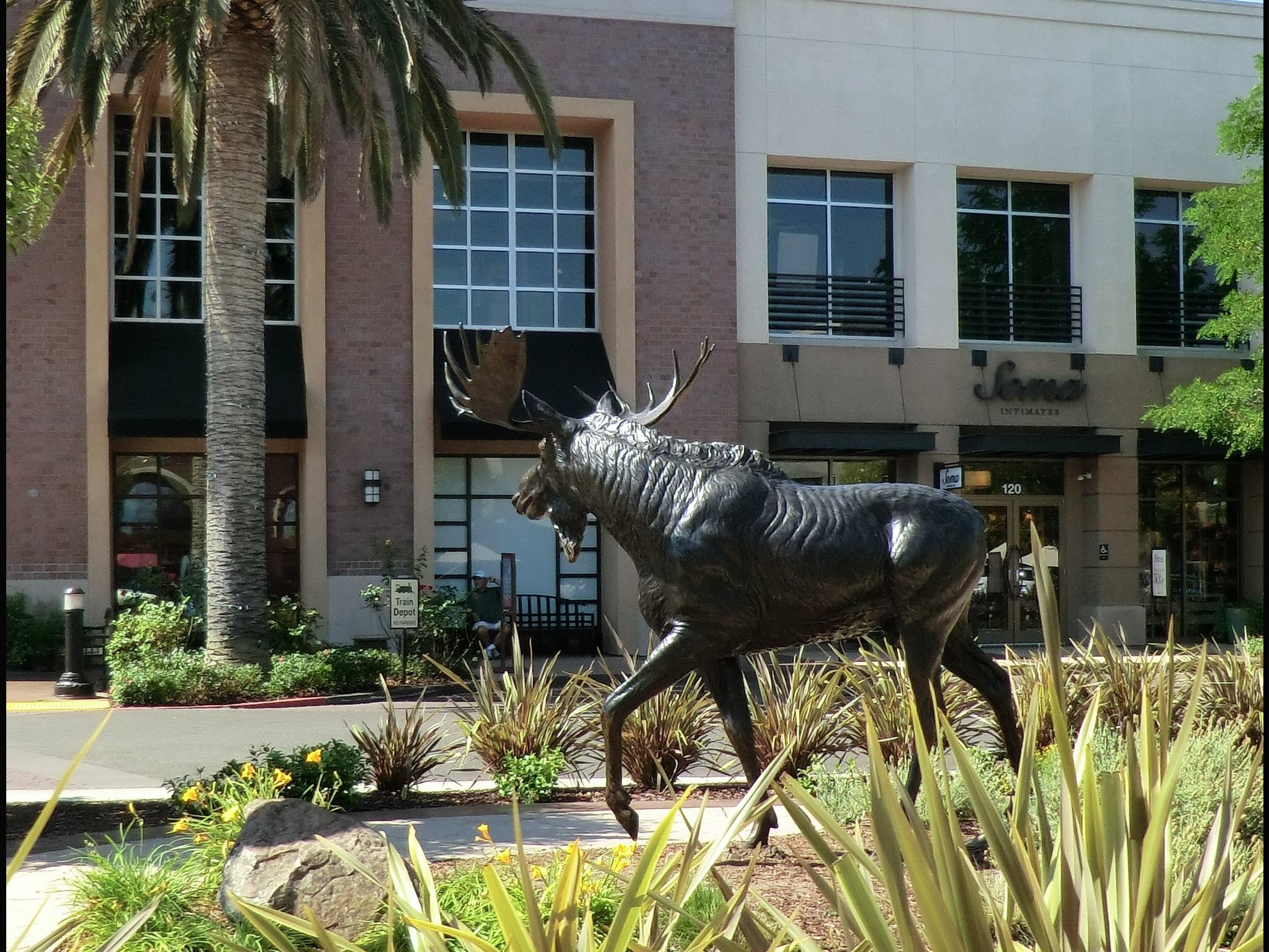
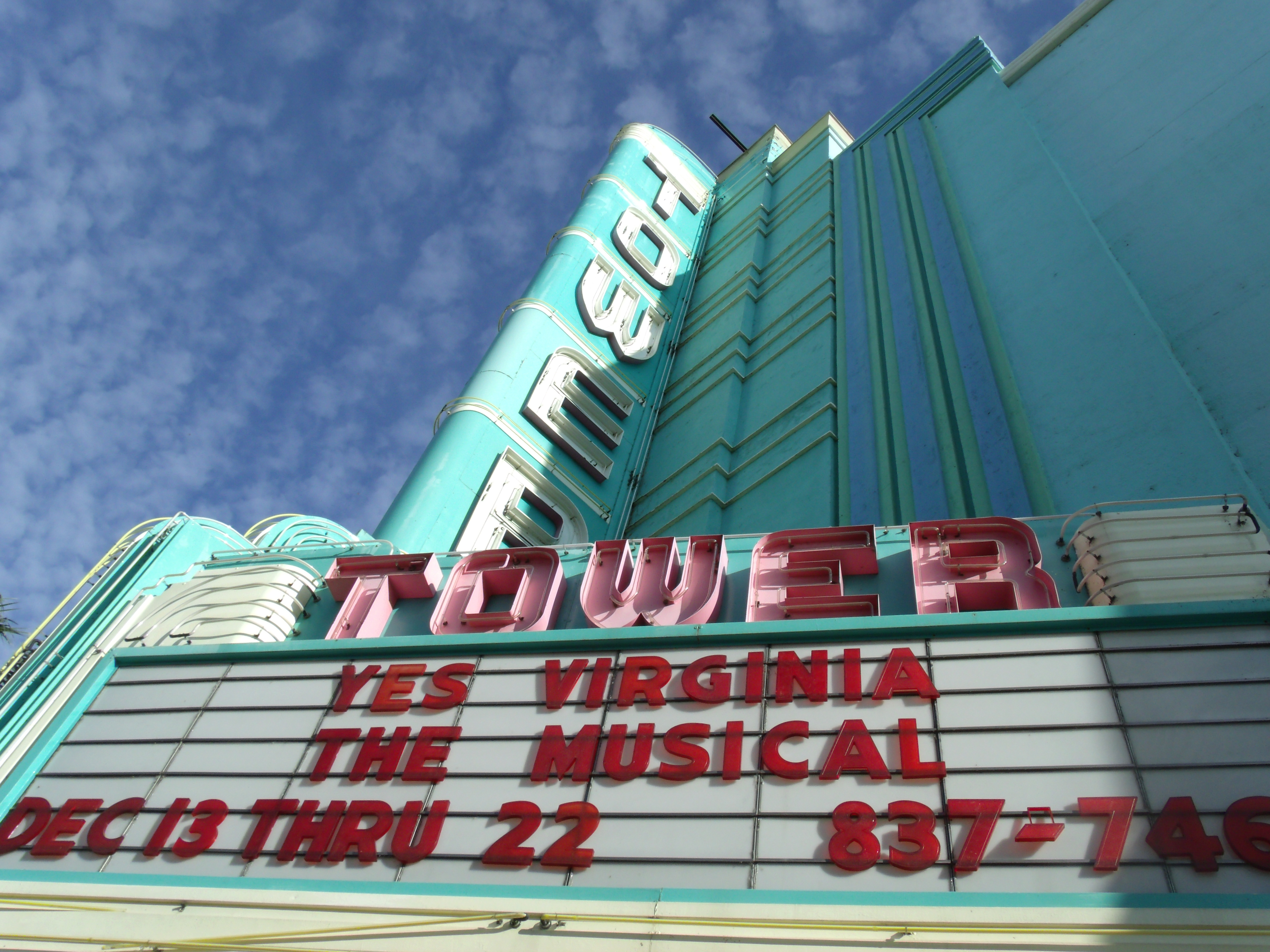
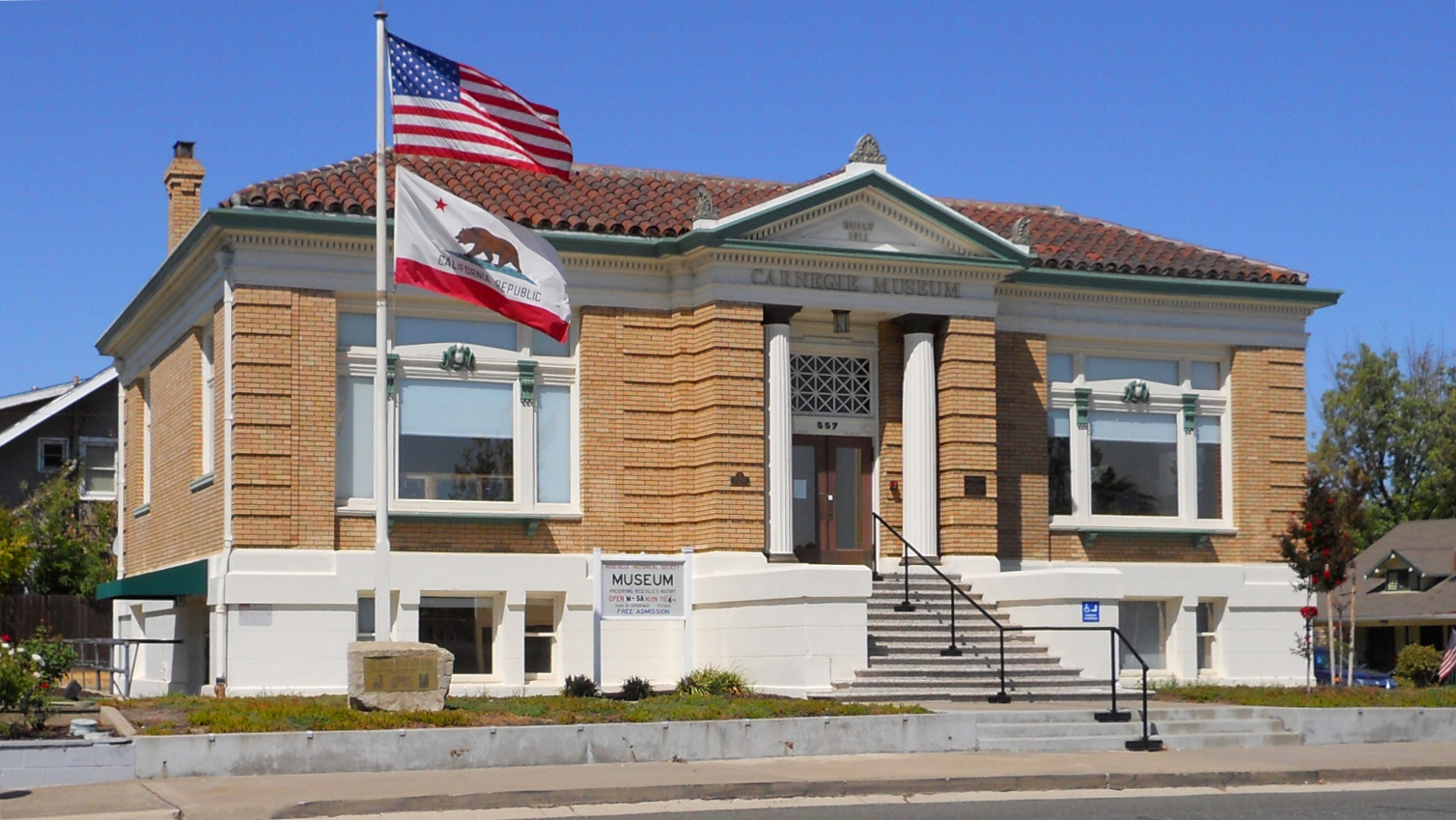
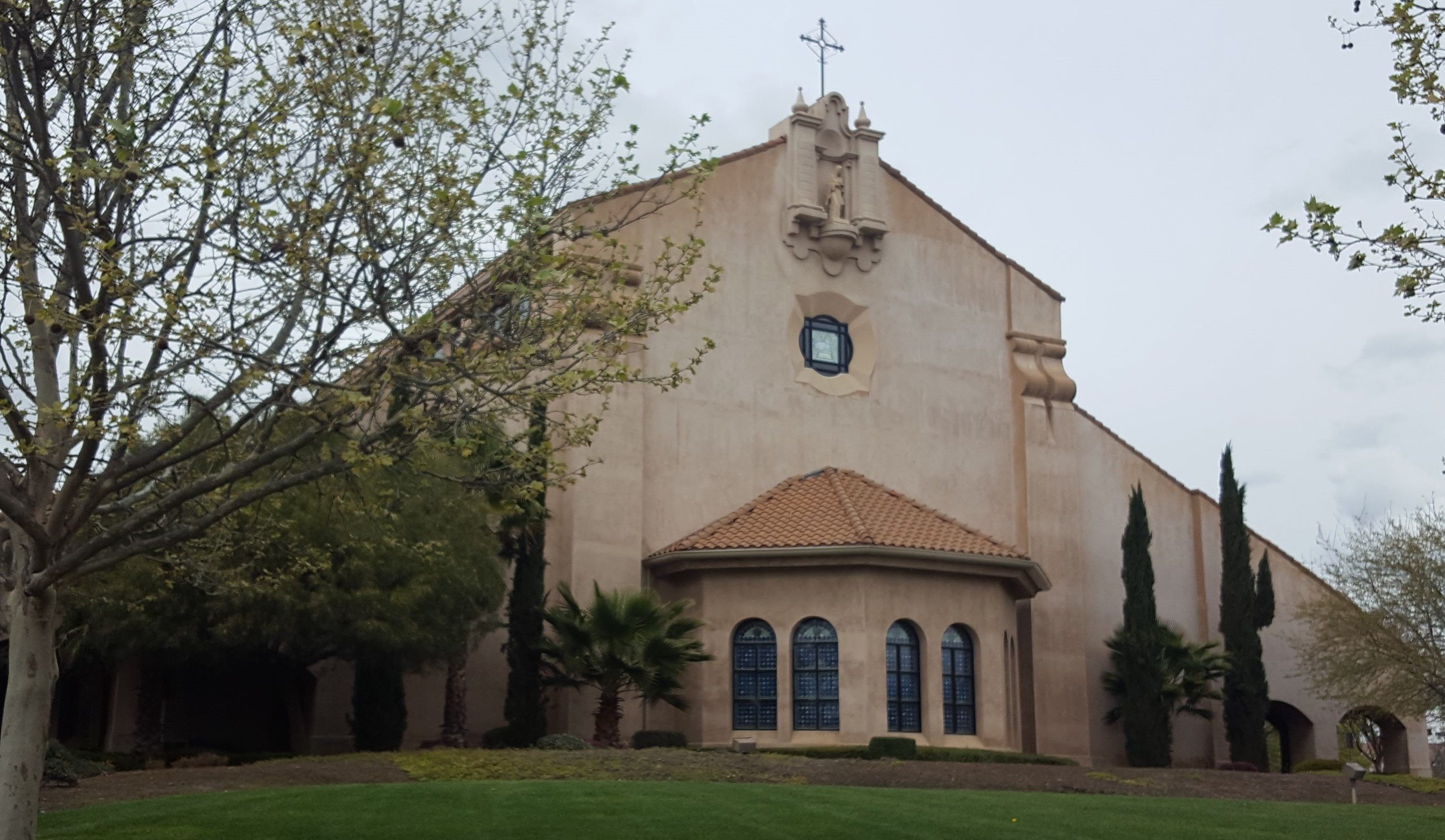
- Clockwise from top right: Tower Theatre; St. Clare Church; Carnegie Museum; Fountains at Roseville

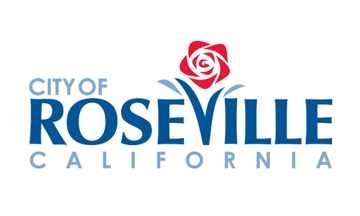
- Flag Logo
- Interactive map of Roseville, California
- Location within California Location within the United States
- Coordinates: 38°45′9″N 121°17′22″W
- Country: United States
- State: California
- County: Placer
- Incorporated: April 10, 1909

Government
  - Type: Council-manager
  - Mayor: Krista Bernasconi
  - State Senator: Roger Niello (R)
  - Assemblymember: Joe Patterson (R)
  - U.S. Rep.: Kevin Kiley (I)

Area
  - Total: 44.08 sq mi (114.16 km^{2})
  - Land: 44.08 sq mi (114.16 km^{2})
  - Water: 0 sq mi (0.00 km^{2}) 0%
- Elevation: 164 ft (50 m)

Population (2020)
  - Total: 147,773
  - Rank: 1st in Placer County; 30th in California; 163rd in the United States
  - Density: 3,210.2/sq mi (1,239.46/km^{2})
- Time zone: UTC−8 (Pacific)
  - Summer (DST): UTC−7 (PDT)
- ZIP codes: 95678, 95661, 95747
- Area code: 916, 279
- FIPS code: 06-62938
- GNIS feature IDs: 1659544, 2411000
- Website: www.roseville.ca.gov

Roseville is the most populous city in Placer County, California, located within the Sacramento metropolitan area. At the 2020 census, the city's population was 147,773, making it the third-largest city in the Sacramento area. Interstate 80 runs through Roseville and State Route 65 runs through part of the northern edge of the city.

Roseville has been a charter city, and is known for its city-owned utilities under Environmental Utilities and Roseville Electric Utility. It is historically associated with the railroad and the city underwent significant urban renewal in the 1980s and 1990s. Today, it has become a major commercial hub, attracting regular shoppers and visitors from a large swath of rural southeastern Sacramento Valley and the Sierra Nevada foothills. In recent years, it has seen significant population growth and new single-family home developments, becoming a "boomburb" or edge city of Sacramento.

== History ==
The Nisenan lived in the land that became Roseville for over 2,000 years before modern settlers moved in. The settlement developed around a stage coach station called Griders. According to the Roseville Historical Society, in 1864 the Central Pacific Railroad tracks were constructed northeastward from Sacramento as part of the transcontinental railroad. The point where the tracks met the California Central Railroad line was named "Junction". Junction eventually became known as Roseville.

In 1909, three years after the Southern Pacific Railroad moved its facilities from Rocklin to Roseville, the town became an incorporated city. What followed was a period of expansion, with businesses building more than 100 structures, including what was the largest ice manufacturing plant in the world (the Pacific Fruit Express building) in 1913.

The city was a railroad town for decades. By 1929, the railroad employed up to 1,225 people out of a total population of 6,425. With the onset of World War II, the rail yards became busier than ever.

The post-war building boom brought continued prosperity. But the nature of the city changed dramatically in the 1950s.

During this decade, the railroad continued to expand and upgrade, converting its steam engine fleet to all diesel engines. But competition arose in new sectors: the postwar development of the national Interstate Highway System and the airline industry adversely affected the railroads' passenger and freight traffic. Trucking carried increasing amount of freight on highways. Industry restructuring took place and jobs were lost as railroads dropped passenger routes and consolidated operations.

Although the railroad has continued as a major employer in Roseville, the city's expansion has been based on the emergence of other employment sectors.

Construction in 1950 of the Washington Boulevard (then called Seawell) railroad underpass dramatically affected downtown. It improved the ability of people to travel from one side of the tracks to the other, but it reduced traffic through the Roseville business district north of the tracks. Those businesses lost customers.

The completion of Interstate 80 in 1956 stimulated new businesses, with a population shift, from downtown to what would become known as East Roseville. The old downtown lost more businesses and slid into a gradual decline.

The Southern Pacific (now Union Pacific) yard was the site of the 1973 Roseville Yard Disaster. A major explosion and fire took place.

The city saw steady population growth throughout the ensuing decades, as shopping centers, major retailers, and homes were constructed, mostly outside the historic downtown. The growth rate was modest until 1985. Between 1929, when the population was 6,425 people, and 1985, the population grew by 22,563 people.

In 1985 the population stood at 28,988 people. Five years later it was 44,685 people, and by 2000 it was 74,234 people. Some of this growth was fueled by the arrival of major technology employers, such as Hewlett Packard (in 1979) and NEC (in 1983), in the city. The population as of 2014 was 126,956 people.

=== Revitalization ===
In 1988, the city embarked on a multi-million dollar plan to redevelop approximately 207 acres (0.8 km^{2}) of land in the downtown core, and revitalize historic areas that had been in decline. Projects included the Vernon Streetscape Project, Atlantic Street Beautification, Civic Plaza Complex, Downtown Vernon Street and Historic Old Town, Historic Old Town Streetscape project, Riverside Avenue Streetscape project, Oak Street Improvement Project, and Washington Boulevard pedestrian underpass. A new parking garage opened in 2007, the Roseville Arts! Blueline Gallery opened in 2008, and a new Civic Center opened in 2013. The Vernon Street Town Square now features a small raised stage, a water spray for children, and a venue for community events.

=== Incidents ===
On April 28, 1973, a shipment of munitions bound for the Vietnam War exploded in Roseville's rail yard, creating a massive disaster.

In 1995, a Roseville police officer shot and killed another officer, Mark A. White, during an attack at the city's police station. White (in plain clothes) drew his weapon against the assailant, but another officer mistakenly believed White was also an assailant and shot and killed him.

On October 21, 2010, a young man set fires inside the Westfield Galleria at Roseville resulting in major damage to the mall. The north wing of the mall reopened the next year after renovations.

== Geography ==
According to the Roseville Civic Center, the city has a total area of 42.26 square miles (109.5 km^{2}), of which 42.24 square miles (109.4 km^{2}) is land. 0.002 square miles, or 1 acre (0.40 ha), is water. Several streams flow through Roseville, including Dry Creek, Linda Creek, Secret Ravine and Cirby Creek.

=== Climate ===
Roseville has a hot-summer Mediterranean climate that is characterized by cool, wet, usually snowless winters and hot, dry summers (Köppen Csa). The climate is similar to nearby Sacramento, the minor differences reflecting Roseville's more inland position, resulting in less of the moderating influence of the ocean. As a result, winters are slightly cooler and summers are slightly hotter than Sacramento. Some marine influence does reach Roseville, so temperatures often are still more moderate than other inland parts of the Central Valley by up to 10 °F (5.6 °C).

The wet season is generally October through April. Because Roseville is east of Sacramento and at a higher elevation, it receives slightly more rainfall. The dry season lasts from June to October; similar to other Central Valley cities, temperatures can be extremely hot in the summer (routinely peaking above 105 °F (41 °C) on the hottest days), unusual for a non-desert climate at mid-latitude. For any given year, summers can be consistently hot or mild depending on where the position of the North Pacific High settles around the end of June. Extremely hot years with July highs typically around 100 °F (38 °C) are averaged out against milder summers that reach around 90 °F (32 °C).

Average daily high temperatures range from 53 °F (12 °C) in January to 94 °F (34 °C) in July. Daily low temperatures range from 39 °F (4 °C) in winter to 61 °F (16 °C) in summer.

On March 26, 2014, an EF0 tornado touched down in Roseville.

Climate data for Roseville, California
Month	Jan	Feb	Mar	Apr	May	Jun	Jul	Aug	Sep	Oct	Nov	Dec	Year
Record high °F (°C)	75 (24)	78 (26)	86 (30)	98 (37)	107 (42)	110 (43)	115 (46)	110 (43)	115 (46)	102 (39)	87 (31)	76 (24)	115 (46)
Mean daily maximum °F (°C)	53 (12)	60 (16)	64 (18)	71 (22)	80 (27)	88 (31)	94 (34)	92 (33)	87 (31)	77 (25)	63 (17)	54 (12)	74 (23)
Daily mean °F (°C)	46 (8)	51 (11)	54 (12)	60 (16)	66 (19)	73 (23)	78 (26)	76 (24)	73 (23)	65 (18)	54 (12)	47 (8)	62 (17)
Mean daily minimum °F (°C)	39 (4)	42 (6)	44 (7)	48 (9)	53 (12)	58 (14)	61 (16)	61 (16)	58 (14)	52 (11)	44 (7)	39 (4)	50 (10)
Record low °F (°C)	21 (−6)	23 (−5)	27 (−3)	33 (1)	36 (2)	43 (6)	48 (9)	46 (8)	41 (5)	31 (−1)	27 (−3)	16 (−9)	16 (−9)
Average precipitation inches (mm)	3.98 (101)	3.46 (88)	3.07 (78)	1.58 (40)	0.58 (15)	0.12 (3.0)	0.04 (1.0)	0.06 (1.5)	0.35 (8.9)	1.08 (27)	2.80 (71)	3.33 (85)	20.45 (519.4)
Source: http://www.myforecast.com/bin/climate.m?city=12133&metric=false

== Demographics ==
Historical population
Census	Pop.	Note	%±
1870	115		—
1880	258		124.3%
1890	345		33.7%
1910	2,608		—
1920	4,477		71.7%
1930	6,425		43.5%
1940	6,653		3.5%
1950	8,723		31.1%
1960	13,421		53.9%
1970	18,221		35.8%
1980	24,347		33.6%
1990	44,685		83.5%
2000	79,921		78.9%
2010	118,788		48.6%
2020	147,773		24.4%
2025 (est.)	167,302	▲	13.2%
U.S. Decennial Census; 1860–1870 1880-1890; 1900 1910 1920; 1930 1940 1950; 1960 1970 1980; 1990 2000 2010; 2020

Roseville, California – Racial and ethnic composition Note: the US Census treats Hispanic/Latino as an ethnic category. This table excludes Latinos from the racial categories and assigns them to a separate category. Hispanics/Latinos may be of any race.
Race / Ethnicity (NH = Non-Hispanic)	Pop 2000	Pop 2010	Pop 2020	% 2000	% 2010	% 2020
White alone (NH)	63,737	84,349	90,347	79.75%	71.01%	61.14%
Black or African American alone (NH)	992	2,157	3,540	1.24%	1.82%	2.40%
Native American or Alaska Native alone (NH)	408	568	520	0.51%	0.48%	0.35%
Asian alone (NH)	3,370	9,785	18,322	4.22%	8.24%	12.40%
Pacific Islander alone (NH)	135	294	475	0.17%	0.25%	0.32%
Other race alone (NH)	103	244	734	0.13%	0.21%	0.50%
Mixed race or Multiracial (NH)	1,951	4,032	9,778	2.44%	3.39%	6.62%
Hispanic or Latino (any race)	9,225	17,359	24,057	11.54%	14.61%	16.28%
Total	79,921	118,788	147,773	100.00%	100.00%	100.00%

=== 2020 ===
The 2020 United States census reported that Roseville had a population of 147,773. The population density was 3,352.5 inhabitants per square mile (1,294.4/km^{2}). The racial makeup of Roseville was 65.6% White, 2.5% African American, 0.8% Native American, 12.7% Asian, 0.4% Pacific Islander, 5.3% from other races, and 12.7% from two or more races. Hispanic or Latino of any race were 16.3% of the population.

The census reported that 99.0% of the population lived in households, 0.5% lived in non-institutionalized group quarters, and 0.6% were institutionalized.

There were 55,237 households, out of which 34.4% included children under the age of 18, 54.1% were married-couple households, 5.7% were cohabiting couple households, 25.8% had a female householder with no partner present, and 14.4% had a male householder with no partner present. 24.0% of households were one person, and 11.7% were one person aged 65 or older. The average household size was 2.65. There were 38,785 families (70.2% of all households).

The age distribution was 23.6% under the age of 18, 7.6% aged 18 to 24, 26.0% aged 25 to 44, 25.1% aged 45 to 64, and 17.7% who were 65 years of age or older. The median age was 39.8 years. For every 100 females, there were 92.8 males.

There were 57,318 housing units at an average density of 1,300.4 units per square mile (502.1 units/km^{2}), of which 55,237 (96.4%) were occupied. Of these, 65.6% were owner-occupied, and 34.4% were occupied by renters.

In 2023, the US Census Bureau estimated that the median household income was $117,354, and the per capita income was $54,484. About 4.3% of families and 6.0% of the population were below the poverty line.

=== 2010 ===
The 2010 United States census reported that Roseville had a population of 118,788. The population density was 3,279.4 inhabitants per square mile (1,266.2/km^{2}). The racial makeup of Roseville was 94,199 (79.3%) White, 2,329 (2.0%) African American, 885 (0.7%) Native American, 10,026 (8.4%) Asian (3.1% Filipino, 2.0% Indian, 1.0% Chinese, 0.6% Japanese, 0.6% Vietnamese, 0.5% Korean, 0.8% Other), 346 (0.3%) Pacific Islander, 5,087 (4.3%) from other races, and 5,916 (5.0%) from two or more races. There were 17,359 people of Hispanic or Latino ancestry, of any race (14.6%).

The Census reported that 117,941 people (99.3% of the population) lived in households, 478 (0.4%) lived in non-institutionalized group quarters, and 369 (0.3%) were institutionalized.

There were 45,059 households, out of which 16,885 (37.5%) had children under the age of 18 living in them, 24,050 (53.4%) were opposite-sex married couples living together, 4,901 (10.9%) had a female householder with no husband present, 2,088 (4.6%) had a male householder with no wife present. There were 2,518 (5.6%) unmarried opposite-sex partnerships, and 286 (0.6%) same-sex married couples or partnerships. 11,042 households (24.5%) were made up of individuals, and 4,502 (10.0%) had someone living alone who was 65 years of age or older. The average household size was 2.62. There were 31,039 families (68.9% of all households); the average family size was 3.14.

The age distribution of the population shows 31,210 people (26.3%) under the age of 18, 9,397 people (7.9%) aged 18 to 24, 33,362 people (28.1%) aged 25 to 44, 28,952 people (24.4%) aged 45 to 64, and 15,867 people (13.4%) who were 65 years of age or older. The median age was 36.8 years. For every 100 females, there were 91.9 males. For every 100 females age 18 and over, there were 88.4 males.

There were 47,757 housing units at an average density of 1,318.4 units per square mile (509.0 units/km^{2}), of which 29,513 (65.5%) were owner-occupied, and 15,546 (34.5%) were occupied by renters. The homeowner vacancy rate was 2.3%; the rental vacancy rate was 6.8%. 79,887 people (67.3% of the population) lived in owner-occupied housing units and 38,054 people (32.0%) lived in rental housing units.

== Economy ==
The city of Roseville has a variety of businesses. It has encouraged the addition of large retail centers, including one of the largest auto malls in the country, which contributes significantly to sales tax receipts at the city and county level. Revenue from sales tax has been a main reason why the city of Roseville has been able to keep up the city's infrastructure as the population has dramatically increased. This environment has produced a mix of housing, small and large employers, as well as shopping opportunities. A popular water park, Roseville Golfland SunSplash, is also located in Roseville. Companies based in the city include financial technology unicorn GoodLeap, which specializes in loans for residential solar energy. The Roseville unemployment rate is 5.2%.

=== Retail commerce ===
Shopping plays a vital role in the economy of Roseville, which has the thirteenth highest retail sales of all California cities. Roseville is considered a regional shopping destination, with the Westfield Galleria at Roseville being the main shopping center in the city and the second-largest shopping mall in Northern California. Westfield embarked on a 487,806-square-foot (45,319 m^{2}) expansion project costing $270 million, because of the revenue they acquire from this high-end mall.

Across the street from the Galleria, Peter Bollinger Investment Company built a $70 million complex named "Fountains at Roseville". Fountains at Roseville is a 330,000 sq ft (31,000 m^{2}) retail center that includes recreation centers. The first phase opened to the public on June 30, 2008, and includes many retailers, as well as a vast variety of casual and fine dining options. Plans call for future construction of hotel, additional retail, and office buildings as well.

In addition to the Galleria and Fountains at Roseville, the city has many shopping plazas surrounding the Galleria and the Douglas Boulevard financial corridor.

=== Major employers ===
The top ten employers of the city as of 2023 are:

Employer	Number of jobs
Kaiser Permanente	5,760
Sutter Roseville Medical Center	5,080
TopGolf	1,970
City of Roseville	1,620
Adventist Health	1,620
Roseville City School District	1,240
Roseville Joint Union High School District	1,084
Flexcare LLC	1,000
Penumbra	810
Hewlett Packard Enterprise	630

== Education ==
=== Public schools ===
Roseville is part of the Roseville City School District, Eureka Union School District, Dry Creek Joint Elementary School District, and Roseville Joint Union High School District. The Roseville Joint Union High School District is ranked #41 best school districts in California.

=== Private schools ===
Merryhill Preschool and Merryhill Elementary School are located in Roseville.

=== Colleges and universities ===
Extension campuses of Brandman University and Sierra College (called "Roseville Center") are located in Roseville.

== Culture ==
Rocklin and Roseville Today is a daily online newspaper. The Roseville Press-Tribune is a local weekly newspaper.

Roseville High School's student-run news organization, Eye of the Tiger, publishes the bimonthly Eye of the Tiger newspaper. It also produces the biweekly Eye of the Tiger News broadcast.

The Sacramento Bee is also distributed in Roseville. Style Magazine, founded in 2003, is the area's largest circulation general interest, monthly magazine.

All American Speedway is a paved short oval racetrack opened in 1954, that currently hosts an annual ARCA Menards Series West stock car race.

== Infrastructure ==
=== Transportation ===
Two highways run through the city: Interstate 80 and State Route 65 (the southern terminus of which connects to I-80).

Amtrak, the national passenger rail system, provides service to Roseville at the Roseville Amtrak Station with service provided along their Capitol Corridor route. J.R. Davis Yard, a Union Pacific Railroad hump yard, is located in Roseville.

Roseville Transit is a public transit service overseen by the city of Roseville and operated by MV Transportation. The system provides a total of 12 regular local routes, as well as the Roseville Transit Dial-A-Ride (DAR) and Roseville Transit Commuter service. There are several stops where connections may be made with the Sacramento Regional Transit line and Placer County Transit.

Placer County Transit connects Roseville with the Watt/I-80 RT light rail station, as well as the cities of Auburn, Lincoln, Rocklin, and other cities along the Interstate 80 corridor. The Placer Commuter Express service to Sacramento also serves the Taylor Rd. park and ride lot.

=== Utilities ===
The City of Roseville provides electric, water, wastewater, and solid waste services to most areas. In February 2020, 75 project customers, including Roseville, received permanent federal water contracts for the Central Valley Project.

Pacific Gas and Electric provides natural gas service. Internet, cable, and/or telephone companies that service the Roseville area include AT&T, Comcast, and Consolidated Communications.

=== Healthcare ===
Major healthcare providers in the city include Sutter Roseville and Kaiser Permanente. There are multiple smaller clinics located near or around the city. UC Davis Medical Center is also located in nearby Sacramento.

=== Fire department ===
The Roseville Fire Department provides fire protection and emergency medical services. The department is responsible for an area of 36 square miles (93 km^{2}) housing a population of 162,788 as of 2023.

The department has nine stations with 2 battalion chiefs.

== Notable people ==
=== Residents ===
- George Barris, auto customizer, created TV's Batmobile
- Isaiah Frey, NFL football player for the Chicago Bears
- Jason Hill, NFL football player
- Bizz Johnson, U.S. Representative and mayor of Roseville
- Kevin Kiley, U.S. Representative and California state senator
- Dan Quinn, mixed martial arts fighter and stevia advocate
- David Yost, actor
- Neilson Powless, professional cyclist
- Kolton Miller, NFL football player for the Las Vegas Raiders
- Jordan Kunaszyk, NFL football player for the Carolina Panthers
- Steven Anderson, Baptist preacher
- Natilie Nunn, American reality show personality

=== Natives ===
- Evelyn Ashford, runner, Olympic gold medalist and world record holder
- Cameron Beaubier, motorcycle racer, five-time MotoAmerica Superbike champion
- Tedy Bruschi, NFL football player
- Dan Bunz, NFL football player
- Connie Champagne, singer and actress
- Ray Clemons, NFL football player
- John Ensign, U.S. Senator from Nevada
- Leanne Hulsenberg, professional bowler and member of the USBC and PWBA Halls of Fame
- Heather Lynn Johnsen, first female tomb guard for the Tomb of the Unknown Soldier (Arlington)
- Thomas King, American-Canadian writer and broadcast presenter
- Andrew Knapp, catcher for the Philadelphia Phillies
- Cassie McFarland, designer of Baseball Hall of Fame Commemorative Coin
- Scott Pruett, 2008 Rolex sports car series championship winner
- Molly Ringwald (born 1968), Brat Pack actress
- Summer Sanders, Olympic swimmer, gold medalist, actress, TV personality
- Dominic Sandoval, dancer, member of dance group Quest Crew
- Andrew Susac, MLB baseball player
- Chelsea Wolfe, Heavy metal singer/songwriter

== See also ==
- Louis Rose
- Rose Creek
- Placer County, California
- Dry Creek (Steelhead Creek tributary)
- Secret Ravine
