= Western Sierra Collegiate Academy =

Location
- 660 Menlo Drive; Rocklin, California 95765; United States; 38.8124°N 121.2984°W

Information
- Type: Public Charter
- Established: 2009
- School district: Rocklin Academy Family of Schools
- Principal: Jennifer Hill
- Grades: 7-12
- Enrollment: 808 (2019-20)
- Student to teacher ratio: 22:1
- Colors: Blue, Gold
- Team name: Wolves
- Website: wscacademy.org

Western Sierra Collegiate Academy is a public charter school serving grades 7–12 in Rocklin, California a northeastern suburb located near Sacramento, California. It is part of the Rocklin Academy Family of Schools, which also includes two elementary schools and one TK-8 school located in Rocklin.

== Academics ==
Western Sierra Collegiate Academy public charter school serving grades 7–12. The school, as of the 2020–2021 school year, uses the Common Core State Standards.
