= Natomas East Main Drainage Canal =

Coordinates: 38.6032°N 121.5158°W

The Natomas East Main Drainage Canal, also known as Steelhead Creek, flows into the Sacramento River in Sacramento County, California.
