= Westfield Galleria at Roseville =

Coordinates: 38.774462°N 121.269053°W

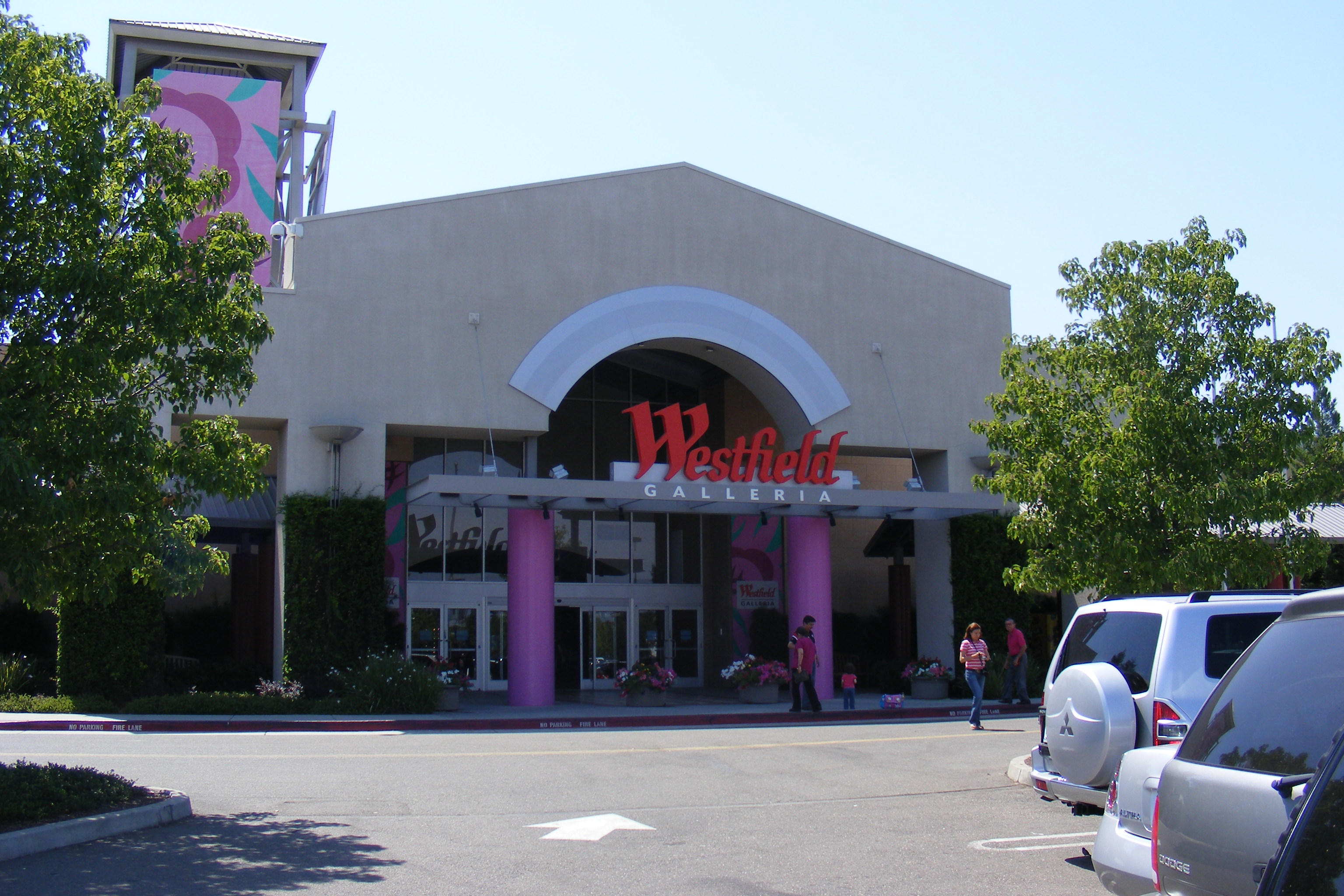
- Location: Roseville, California
- Address: 1151 Galleria Blvd
- Opened: August 25, 2000; 26 years ago
- Developer: Urban Retail Properties
- Manager: Unibail-Rodamco-Westfield
- Owner: Unibail-Rodamco-Westfield
- Num. of stores: 190+
- Num. of anchor tenants: 4
- Floor area: 1,336,009 sq ft (124,119.3 m^{2})
- Floors: 2
- Parking: 6,400
- Website: www.westfield.com/united-states/galleriaatroseville

Westfield Galleria at Roseville is a two-level, 1,300,000-square-foot (120,000 m^{2}) indoor upscale shopping mall in Roseville, California, United States owned by Unibail-Rodamco-Westfield. It is the largest shopping mall in the Sacramento metropolitan area, followed by Sunrise Mall in Citrus Heights and Arden Fair Mall in Sacramento.

The property is anchored by department stores Macy's, JCPenney, and Nordstrom, a 14-screen Cinemark theater, a Round One Entertainment center, and large-scale Pottery Barn and Crate & Barrel furniture stores. It is the sole location of luxury retailers Louis Vuitton, Gucci, Tiffany & Co., and Saint Laurent in the Sacramento area.

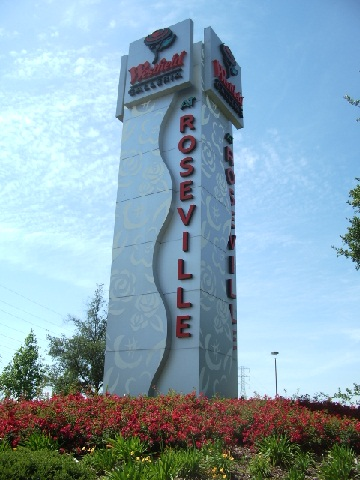
Stele signage at the corner of Galleria Boulevard and Roseville Parkway

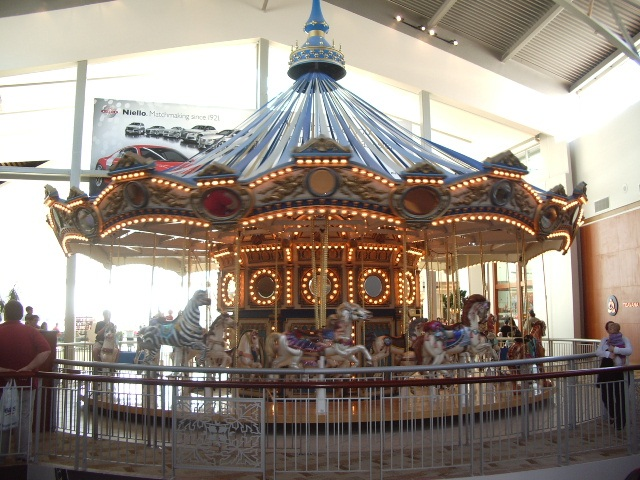
Carousel located inside the mall, removed in 2020

== History ==
On July 25, 1995, the construction of an enclosed shopping center in two phases within the city of Roseville, to be developed by Urban Retail Properties, Inc., was approved. Sears became the first anchor tenant to commit to the property, with Nordstrom following suit in April 1998. A modification to the project, allowing for a single phase of construction and additional anchor space, was approved in June 1998, making way for Macy's to commit to the property the following month. JCPenney committed in September 1998, filling the mall's planned anchor space in time for its September 2 groundbreaking. The Galleria at Roseville opened for business on August 25, 2000 with 120 stores and the Promenade, an outdoor wing of shops and restaurants anchored by a Crate & Barrel store, considered novel at the time.

One month after the property's grand opening, Urban's shopping center division was acquired by Netherlands-based real estate firm Rodamco for $3.4 billion. A consortium of shopping center owners then purchased Rodamco's North American assets for $5.3 billion in January 2002, with Australia-based Westfield Corporation taking control of the Galleria at Roseville and renaming the property Westfield Shoppingtown Galleria at Roseville. The Shoppingtown moniker was dropped from all Westfield properties in 2005, with Westfield Galleria at Roseville becoming the property's new title.

In 2004, Westfield announced plans to expand the four year-old Galleria. After several changes, the expansion consisting of 400,000 square feet (37,000 m^{2}) of new and reconfigured retail space, a new Dining Terrace, and 40,000-square-foot (3,700 m^{2}) additions to both JCPenney and Macy's was approved. A portion of the outdoor Promenade area and the property's original food court were demolished and Crate & Barrel was relocated to accommodate the project. The expansion was completed in 2009 at a final cost of $270 million, bringing the property to 1.3 million square feet and turning the Galleria into the region's largest shopping center.

In 2015, Sears Holdings spun off 235 of its properties, including the Sears at Westfield Galleria at Roseville, into Seritage Growth Properties. On April 17, 2018, Sears announced it would close its Roseville store. A Cinemark movie theater and a Round One Entertainment center took over much of the former Sears building, opening in late 2021 and mid-2022 respectively. Unibail-Rodamco-Westfield later purchased the redeveloped Sears building from Seritage in December 2022, at a cost of $23.4 million.

Forever 21, which operated a 32,790-square-foot (3,046 m^{2}), two-story location in the mall's outdoor promenade, closed in March 2024. In 2026, mall management announced a renovation of the outdoor promenade to become "The Trails", adding new shops and restaurants along with an updated landscaping and exterior design package.

=== 2010 fire ===
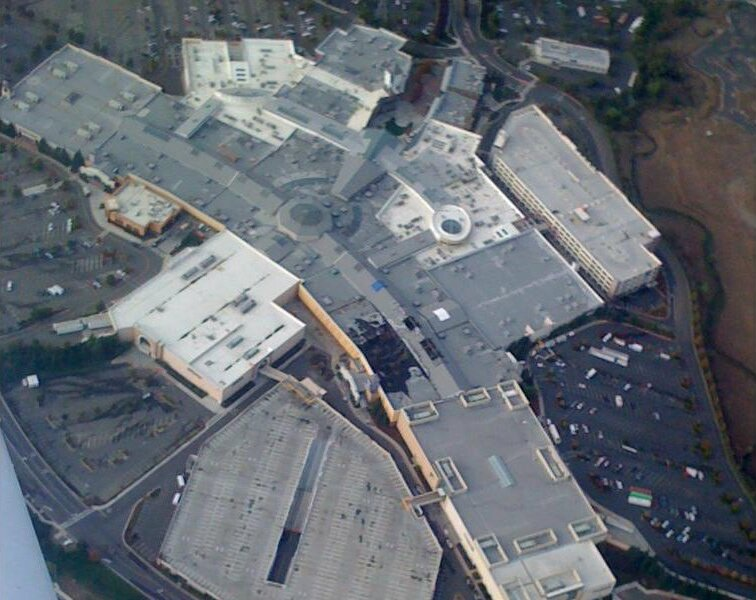
Aerial view of the damage from the 2010 fire

On October 21, 2010, 23-year old Alexander Piggee entered the property's GameStop store with a large backpack, claiming to have a weapon and that his "sister had been kidnapped by aliens." Piggee barricaded himself in the store and set fire to the merchandise as employees fled. The mall was evacuated as authorities tried to locate Piggee, arresting him as he attempted to flee the scene. The mall's fire sprinkler system was manually shut off due to a miscommunication, allowing the fire to grow and eventually engulf much of the mall's north end as firefighters from surrounding cities were called in. Most of the mall's north wing between Macy's and Sears was destroyed and the roof of the wing partially collapsed, with total damages estimated at $55 million.

California governor Arnold Schwarzenegger declared a state of emergency in Placer County the day after the fire, with mall officials and city representatives vowing to have the property partially reopened by the upcoming Christmas shopping season. Unaffected portions of the property began reopening in phases less than two weeks later. The damaged north wing was rebuilt over the following year, while a renovation was undertaken elsewhere in the mall adding new flooring, lighting, signage, and architectural details to match the rebuilt wing. The north wing reopened to the public on October 6, 2011.

Alexander Piggee subsequently pleaded guilty to setting the fire, and federal judge John Mendez sentenced Piggee to 15 years, after which he will be on probation for 6 years. Both defense and prosecution attorneys had requested a sentence of 10 years, but Mendez issued a substantially longer sentence, calling Piggee a threat to public safety.
