= Rocklin, California =

City in California, United States

- City
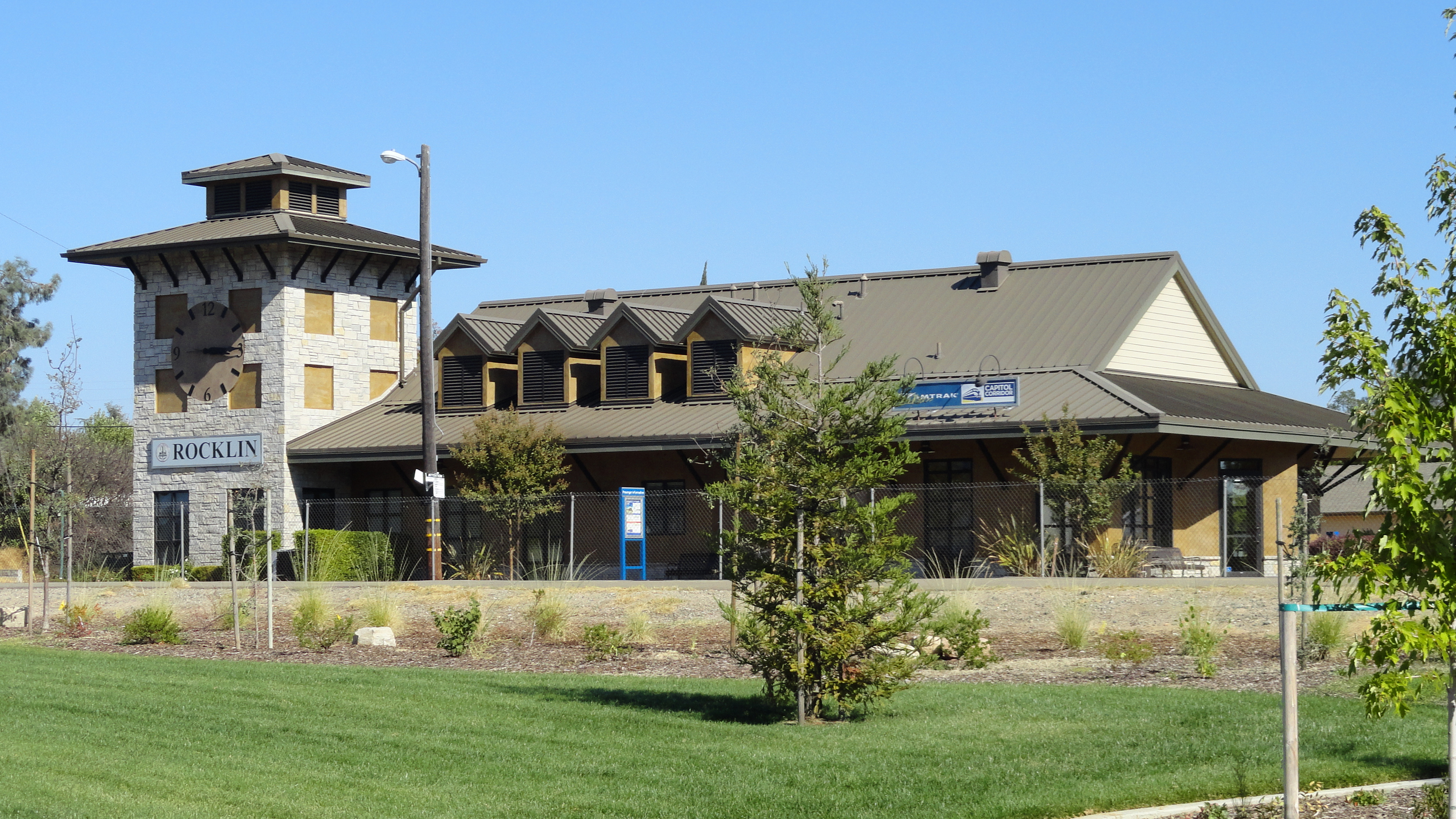
- Amtrak station and Chamber of Commerce, Rocklin
- Motto: "A Family Community"
- Interactive map of Rocklin, California
- Location in the United States
- Coordinates: 38°48′0″N 121°14′48″W
- Country: United States
- State: California
- County: Placer
- Incorporated: February 24, 1893

Government
  - Type: Council-manager system
  - Mayor: David Bass
  - State Senate: Roger Niello (R)
  - State Assembly: Joe Patterson (R)
  - U. S. Congress: Kevin Kiley (I)

Area
  - Total: 19.83 sq mi (51.36 km^{2})
  - Land: 19.81 sq mi (51.31 km^{2})
  - Water: 0.023 sq mi (0.06 km^{2})
- Elevation: 249 ft (76 m)

Population (2020)
  - Total: 71,601
  - Density: 3,614/sq mi (1,395/km^{2})
- Demonym: Rocklinite
- Time zone: UTC-8 (PST)
  - Summer (DST): UTC-7 (PDT)
- ZIP codes: 95677, 95765
- Area codes: 916, 279
- FIPS code: 06-62364
- GNIS feature ID: 0277586
- Website: www.rocklin.ca.gov

Rocklin is a city in Placer County, California, United States, about 22 miles (35 km) northeast of Sacramento and about 6.1 miles (9.8 km) northeast of Roseville in the Sacramento metropolitan area. Besides Roseville, it borders Granite Bay, Loomis, and Lincoln. As of the 2020 census, Rocklin's population was 71,601.

== History ==
Before the California Gold Rush, the Nisenan Maidu occupied both permanent villages and temporary summer shelters along the rivers and streams that miners sifted, sluiced, dredged, and dammed to remove the gold. Explorer Jedediah Smith and a large party of American fur trappers crossed the Sacramento Valley in April 1827. The group saw many Maidu villages along the river banks. Deprived of traditional foodstuffs, homesites, and hunting grounds by the emigrants, the Nisenan were among the earliest California Indian tribes to disappear.

During the 1850s, miners sluiced streams and rivers, including Secret Ravine, which runs through Rocklin. The piles of dredger tailings are still obvious today, between Roseville and Loomis southeast of Interstate 80. Secret Ravine, at the area now at the intersection of Ruhkala Road and Pacific Street, was later mined for granite, some of which was used as the base course of the California Capitol Building; the earliest recorded use of the rock was for Fort Mason at San Francisco in 1855. The granite was hauled out by oxcarts before the arrival of the railroad many years later.

In 1860, the U.S. Census counted 440 residents in the area of Secret Ravine, of whom about 16% had been born in Ireland and the majority of whom worked as miners. The area was called Secret Ravine or the "granite quarries at the end of the tracks" as late as 1864.

Rocklin's history is closely tied to the transcontinental railroad. In 1862, the Pacific Railroad Act granted the Central Pacific Railroad land near Secret Ravine. In 1864, the Central Pacific Railroad completed an extension of its track southwest from Newcastle to Secret Ravine. It named the area Rocklin after its granite quarry and used the site as a refueling and water stop. The Central Pacific built a roundhouse in 1867. The transcontinental railroad was completed in 1869, significantly increasing railroad traffic through the town. According to the 1870 census, Rocklin had 542 residents, and the majority of Irish immigrants had forgone mining and were working for the railroad. In 1908, the Central Pacific moved its facility from Rocklin to Roseville, where more land was available for expansion. The Roseville site has remained in continuous use since. As of 2014, it was the largest rail facility near the U.S. West Coast.

In 1869, a group of laid-off Chinese railroad workers moved to Secret Ravine to mine and raise vegetables, which they sold locally. The Chinese were violently driven out in 1876 after a group of them were accused of murdering three people near Rocklin. The area was still known as China Gardens as of 1974.

The Rocklin post office opened in 1868. Finnish immigrants settled in Rocklin starting in the 1870s, and Spanish settlers arriving by way of Hawaii settled in Rocklin in the early 20th century. The town incorporated in 1893.

== Geography ==
According to the United States Census Bureau, the city has an area of 19.8 square miles (51 km^{2}), of which 0.02 square miles (0.052 km^{2}), or 0.11%, is water.

=== Climate ===
Rocklin has a hot-summer Mediterranean climate (Köppen Csa), characterized by cool, wet winters and hot, dry summers. Summers are hot, with an average July high of 94 °F (34 °C), and mostly rainless. Winters are cool, with a December average of 47 °F (8 °C), and see plenty of rain. Rocklin very rarely sees snow accumulation. The degree of diurnal temperature variation varies greatly depending on time of year. It ranges from only 14 °F in January to 33 °F in July.

Climate data for Rocklin, California
Month	Jan	Feb	Mar	Apr	May	Jun	Jul	Aug	Sep	Oct	Nov	Dec	Year
Record high °F (°C)	76 (24)	82 (28)	90 (32)	97 (36)	107 (42)	115 (46)	115 (46)	118 (48)	114 (46)	105 (41)	88 (31)	80 (27)	118 (48)
Mean daily maximum °F (°C)	53.7 (12.1)	59.3 (15.2)	64.5 (18.1)	71.2 (21.8)	79.8 (26.6)	89.0 (31.7)	96.5 (35.8)	95.0 (35.0)	89.2 (31.8)	78.5 (25.8)	65.4 (18.6)	54.7 (12.6)	74.7 (23.7)
Daily mean °F (°C)	44.3 (6.8)	48.4 (9.1)	52.2 (11.2)	57.3 (14.1)	64.1 (17.8)	71.3 (21.8)	77.2 (25.1)	75.6 (24.2)	70.9 (21.6)	62.4 (16.9)	52.0 (11.1)	44.9 (7.2)	60.1 (15.6)
Mean daily minimum °F (°C)	34.9 (1.6)	37.6 (3.1)	39.9 (4.4)	43.4 (6.3)	48.3 (9.1)	53.7 (12.1)	57.9 (14.4)	56.2 (13.4)	52.6 (11.4)	46.2 (7.9)	38.7 (3.7)	34.9 (1.6)	45.4 (7.4)
Record low °F (°C)	14 (−10)	20 (−7)	23 (−5)	27 (−3)	19 (−7)	34 (1)	34 (1)	33 (1)	29 (−2)	25 (−4)	20 (−7)	14 (−10)	14 (−10)
Average precipitation inches (mm)	4.89 (124)	3.86 (98)	3.27 (83)	1.79 (45)	0.76 (19)	0.28 (7.1)	0.03 (0.76)	0.03 (0.76)	0.32 (8.1)	1.25 (32)	2.57 (65)	3.75 (95)	22.80 (579)
Average precipitation days	10	9	7	5	3	1	0	0	1	3	6	8	53
Source: Western Regional Climate Center

== Demographics ==
Historical population
Census	Pop.	Note	%±
1870	542		—
1880	624		15.1%
1890	1,056		69.2%
1900	1,050		−0.6%
1910	1,026		−2.3%
1920	643		−37.3%
1930	724		12.6%
1940	795		9.8%
1950	1,155		45.3%
1960	1,495		29.4%
1970	3,039		103.3%
1980	7,344		141.7%
1990	19,033		159.2%
2000	36,330		90.9%
2010	56,974		56.8%
2020	71,601		25.7%
2025 (est.)	76,821	▲	7.3%
U.S. Decennial Census

=== 2020 census ===
As of the 2020 census, Rocklin had a population of 71,601. The population density was 3,614.4 inhabitants per square mile (1,395.5/km^{2}). 99.9% of residents lived in urban areas, while 0.1% lived in rural areas.

The census reported that 98.6% of the population lived in households, 1.1% lived in non-institutionalized group quarters, and 0.3% were institutionalized. There were 25,322 households, of which 40.0% had children under the age of 18 living in them. Of all households, 58.6% were married-couple households, 5.2% were cohabiting-couple households, 13.0% were households with a male householder and no spouse or partner present, and 23.2% were households with a female householder and no spouse or partner present. About 20.4% of all households were made up of individuals, and 9.9% had someone living alone who was 65 years of age or older. The average household size was 2.79. There were 18,767 families (74.1% of all households).

The age distribution was 25.9% under the age of 18, 8.8% aged 18 to 24, 24.7% aged 25 to 44, 25.9% aged 45 to 64, and 14.7% aged 65 or older. The median age was 38.5 years. For every 100 females there were 94.4 males, and for every 100 females age 18 and over there were 90.5 males age 18 and over.

There were 26,124 housing units at an average density of 1,318.7 units per square mile (509.2 units/km^{2}), of which 3.1% were vacant. Of the 25,322 occupied units, 67.6% were owner-occupied and 32.4% were occupied by renters. The homeowner vacancy rate was 0.8% and the rental vacancy rate was 4.8%.

Racial composition as of the 2020 census
Race	Number	Percent
White	49,202	68.7%
Black or African American	1,278	1.8%
American Indian and Alaska Native	479	0.7%
Asian	8,486	11.9%
Native Hawaiian and Other Pacific Islander	212	0.3%
Some other race	2,750	3.8%
Two or more races	9,194	12.8%
Hispanic or Latino (of any race)	9,944	13.9%

=== 2023 ACS 5-year estimates ===
In 2023, the US Census Bureau estimated that 13.2% of the population were foreign-born. Of all people aged 5 or older, 83.0% spoke only English at home, 4.9% spoke Spanish, 5.7% spoke other Indo-European languages, 5.6% spoke Asian or Pacific Islander languages, and 0.8% spoke other languages. Of those aged 25 or older, 96.3% were high school graduates and 48.5% had a bachelor's degree.

The median household income in 2023 was $120,916, and the per capita income was $54,517. About 3.0% of families and 5.1% of the population were below the poverty line.

=== 2010 census ===
At the 2010 census, Rocklin had a population of 56,974. The population density was 2,907.7 inhabitants per square mile (1,122.7/km^{2}). The racial makeup of Rocklin was 47,047 (82.6%) White, 858 (1.5%) African American, 410 (0.7%) Native American, 4,105 (7.2%) Asian, 150 (0.3%) Pacific Islander, 1,538 (2.7%) from other races, and 2,866 (5.0%) from two or more races. Hispanic or Latino of any race were 6,555 persons (11.5%).

The census reported that 56,337 people (98.9% of the population) lived in households, 456 (0.8%) lived in non-institutionalized group quarters, and 181 (0.3%) were institutionalized.

There were 20,800 households, 8,424 (40.5%) had children under the age of 18 living in them, 11,974 (57.6%) were opposite-sex married couples living together, 2,191 (10.5%) had a female householder with no husband present, 895 (4.3%) had a male householder with no wife present. There were 1,035 (5.0%) unmarried opposite-sex partnerships, and 124 (0.6%) same-sex married couples or partnerships. 4,403 households (21.2%) were one person and 1,652 (7.9%) had someone living alone who was 65 or older. The average household size was 2.71. There were 15,060 families (72.4% of households); the average family size was 3.18.

The age distribution was 15,613 people (27.4%) under the age of 18, 5,306 people (9.3%) aged 18 to 24, 15,159 people (26.6%) aged 25 to 44, 14,668 people (25.7%) aged 45 to 64, and 6,228 people (10.9%) who were 65 or older. The median age was 36.7 years. For every 100 females, there were 94.0 males. For every 100 females age 18 and over, there were 90.4 males.

There were 22,010 housing units at an average density of 1,123.3 per square mile, of the occupied units 13,797 (66.3%) were owner-occupied and 7,003 (33.7%) were rented. The homeowner vacancy rate was 2.5%; the rental vacancy rate was 7.3%. 39,295 people (69.0% of the population) lived in owner-occupied housing units and 17,042 people (29.9%) lived in rental housing units.

== Economy ==
Granite mining ended in 2004 in Rocklin. Top Rocklin employers include large multinational corporations, retail outlets, education, and government. As of 2016, Rocklin had an estimated civilian workforce of 30,100 with an unemployment rate of 4.4%. About 40% of Rocklin citizens over age 25 hold a bachelor's degree or higher.

Shopping, entertainment, and dining can be found in the Blue Oaks Town Center, a regional shopping center anchored by national tenants on the Highway 65 corridor, and in Rocklin Commons and Rocklin Crossings, with tenants including Target, Walmart, and Bass Pro Shop, along Interstate 80. A section of Granite Drive along Interstate 80 known as Toy Row has high-end auto dealerships, RV and boat retailers, and a local antique mall.

The city has four districts with distinct architectural guidelines: the University District, Granite District, College District, and Quarry District.

== Education ==
The Rocklin area has 13 elementary schools, two middle schools, two high schools, and two alternative education institutions, encompassed in the Rocklin Unified School District, as well as campuses of Sierra College and William Jessup University.

== Infrastructure ==
=== Transportation ===
Interstate 80 and State Route 65 intersect in Rocklin, and historic U.S. Route 40 runs through town. The Rocklin Amtrak station is served by Amtrak California's Capitol Corridor route.

== Notable people ==
- Brandon Aiyuk, wide receiver for the San Francisco 49ers
- Seth Casiple, soccer player
- Johnny Davis, kickboxer
- Kevin Kiley, U.S. representative
- John Romero, video game developer
- Santiago Suárez, soccer player
- Logan Webb, pitcher for the San Francisco Giants
- Karyn White, pop singer
- Nick Mears, pitcher for the Kansas City Royals
