= Interstate 80 in California =

Interstate 80
- Dwight D. Eisenhower Highway
- I-80 highlighted in red

Route information
- Maintained by Caltrans
- Length: 205.07 mi (330.03 km) 203.08 miles (326.83 km) per FHWA
- Existed: July 1, 1964–present
- Tourist routes: Yuba-Donner Scenic Byway
- NHS: Entire route
- Restrictions: No flammable tank vehicles or explosives on the Bay Bridge

Major junctions
- West end: US 101 in San Francisco
- I-580 from Oakland to Albany; I-880 in Oakland; I-780 in Vallejo; I-680 in Fairfield; I-505 in Vacaville; US 50 / I-80 BL in West Sacramento; I-5 / SR 99 in Sacramento; I-80 BL in North Highlands; SR 65 in Roseville; SR 49 in Auburn
- East end: I-80 at the Nevada state line near Verdi, NV

Location
- Country: United States
- State: California
- Counties: San Francisco, Alameda, Contra Costa, Solano, Napa, Yolo, Sacramento, Placer, Nevada, Sierra

Highway system
- Interstate Highway System; Main; Auxiliary; Suffixed; Business; Future; State highways in California; Interstate; US; State; Scenic; History; Pre‑1964; Unconstructed; Deleted; Freeways
← SR 79	→ US 80

Interstate 80 (I-80) is a transcontinental Interstate Highway in the United States, stretching from San Francisco, California, to Teaneck, New Jersey. The segment of I-80 in California runs east from San Francisco across the San Francisco–Oakland Bay Bridge to Oakland, where it turns north and crosses the Carquinez Bridge before turning back northeast through the Sacramento Valley. I-80 then traverses the Sierra Nevada, cresting at Donner Summit, before crossing into the state of Nevada within the Truckee River Canyon. The speed limit is at most 65 mph (105 km/h) along the entire route instead of the state's maximum of 70 mph (110 km/h) as most of the route is in either urban areas or mountainous terrain. I-80 has portions designated as the Eastshore Freeway and Alan S. Hart Freeway.

Throughout California, I-80 was built along the corridor of US Route 40 (US 40), eventually replacing this designation entirely. The prior US 40 corridor itself was built along several historic corridors in California, notably the California Trail and Lincoln Highway. The route has changed from the original plans in San Francisco due to freeway revolts canceling segments of the originally planned alignment. Similarly in Sacramento, the freeway was rerouted around the city after plans to upgrade the original grandfathered route through the city to Interstate Highway standards were canceled.

== Route description ==
The entirety of Interstate 80 in California is defined in section 380 of the California Streets and Highways Code as Route 80:

Route 80 is from:
(a) Route 101 near Division Street in San Francisco to Route 280 near First Street in San Francisco.
(b) Route 280 near First Street in San Francisco to the Nevada state line near Verdi, Nevada, passing near Oakland, via Albany, via Sacramento, passing near Roseville, via Auburn, via Emigrant Gap, via Truckee and via the Truckee River Canyon.

The section of Route 80 defined in subdivision (a) is not considered an Interstate Highway according to the Federal Highway Administration (FHWA)'s route logs, but is still signed as I-80 by Caltrans.

I-80 is recognized as the Dwight D. Eisenhower Highway in the Western United States and a Blue Star Memorial Highway for its entire length. In California, it follows the original corridor of the Lincoln Highway from Sacramento to Reno (with minor deviations near Donner Summit). I-80 is part of the California Freeway and Expressway System and is part of the National Highway System, a network of highways that are considered essential to the country's economy, defense, and mobility by the Federal Highway Administration (FHWA). I-80 is also known as the Dutch Flat and Donner Lake Wagon Road from Emigrant Gap to Donner Lake. The segment of I-80 from Emigrant Gap to Truckee also forms part of the Yuba–Donner Scenic Byway, a National Forest Scenic Byway.

=== San Francisco Bay Area ===
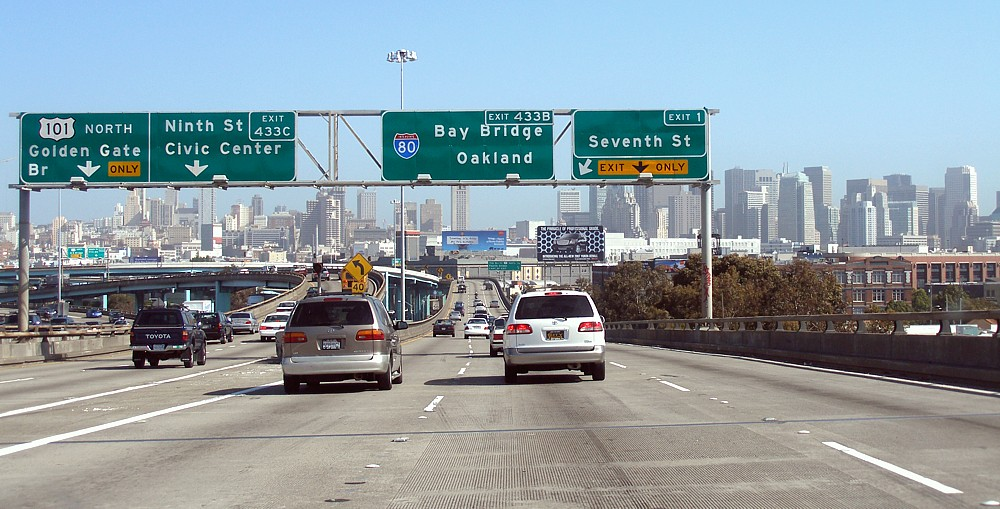
The western terminus of I-80 in San Francisco, viewed from northbound US 101

According to the California Streets and Highways Code, most maps, and local signs, I-80 begins at the interchange with US 101 in San Francisco. However, federal records place the western terminus of I-80 at the western approach to the San Francisco–Oakland Bay Bridge, at the location of the Fremont Street offramp (previously known as the Terminal Separator Structure that once connected it to the Embarcadero Freeway). The federal and state governments disagree as to whether this westernmost segment of the signed Interstate, known as the San Francisco Skyway or Bayshore Viaduct, is actually part of the Interstate Highway System, although it is consistently shown as I-80 on most maps of San Francisco.

==== Eastshore Freeway ====
The Eastshore Freeway is a segment of I-80 and I-580 along the northeast shoreline of San Francisco Bay. It runs from the MacArthur Maze interchange just east of the eastern end of the San Francisco–Oakland Bay Bridge to the Carquinez Bridge. I-580 splits from the Eastshore Freeway at an interchange known locally as the "Hoffman Split" in Albany. The section of the Eastshore Freeway between the MacArthur Maze and I-580 (Hoffman) split between Albany is a wrong-way concurrency where the northbound direction is signed as I-80 east and I-580 west, while the southbound direction is signed as westbound I-80 and eastbound I-580. This segment suffers from severe traffic congestion during rush hour due to the merger of three freeways (I-80, I-580, and I-880) at the MacArthur Maze.

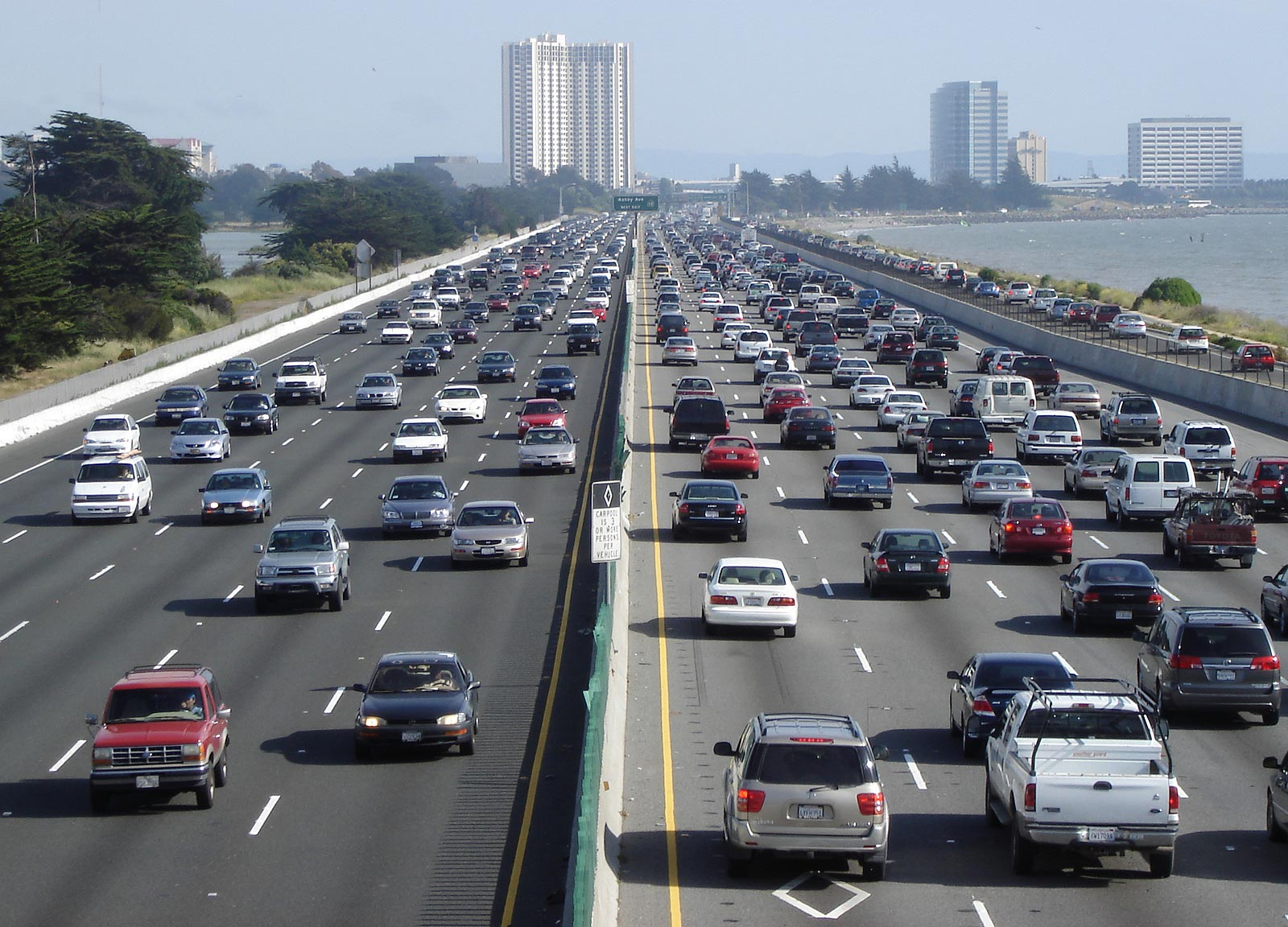
Eastshore Freeway in Berkeley, view south toward Pacific Park Plaza in Emeryville

The Eastshore Freeway was created in the mid-1950s (construction commenced in 1954, last segment completed May 10, 1960) by reengineering the Eastshore Highway, a thoroughfare constructed in the 1930s (1934–1937) as one of the approaches to the Bay Bridge and designated as part of US 40. The Eastshore Highway began in El Cerrito at an intersection with San Pablo Avenue at Hill Street between Potrero Avenue and Cutting Boulevard, adjacent to the location today of the El Cerrito del Norte station of Bay Area Rapid Transit (BART). It was not a freeway in that access was at intersections with adjoining streets rather than by ramps. The Eastshore Highway ran from El Cerrito to the San Francisco–Oakland Bay Bridge along the same routing as today's freeway, although it was much narrower. A causeway was constructed for this purpose by filling in part of the mudflats along the bayshore. In the stretch from University to Ashby avenues in Berkeley, this resulted in the creation of an artificial lagoon which was developed by the Works Progress Administration (WPA) in the late 1930s as Aquatic Park.

The frontage road along the east side of today's Eastshore Freeway between Buchanan Street in Albany and Hearst Avenue in Berkeley retains the name "Eastshore Highway". The terminal segment of the old Eastshore Highway in El Cerrito between Potrero and San Pablo avenues is today named "Eastshore Boulevard".

Originally, the name "Eastshore Freeway" was also applied to what is today known as the "Nimitz Freeway" (I-880) from the beginning of its construction in 1947. This freeway was dedicated in 1958 to Chester W. Nimitz, and so, for a few years in the 1950s prior, the Eastshore Freeway stretched the entire length of the east shore of San Francisco Bay. Until the late 1960s, the Eastshore Freeway was also designated as part of State Route 17 (SR 17) together with the Nimitz Freeway.

=== Central Valley ===
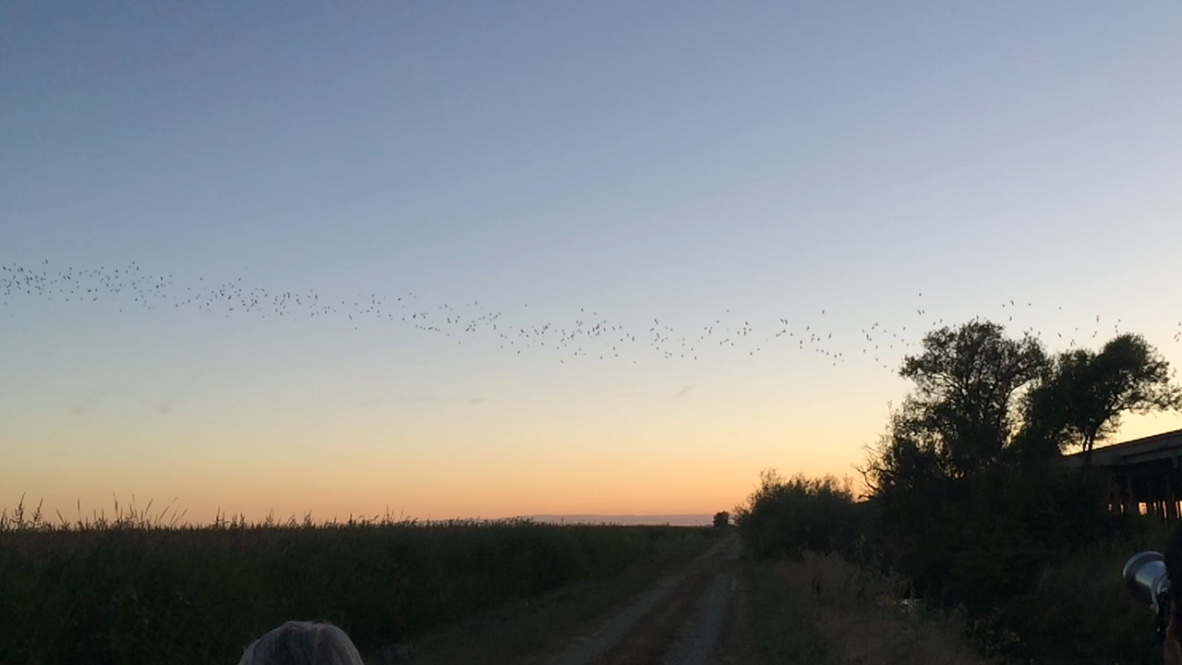
Bats flying from under the Yolo Causeway in Yolo County

This section of I-80 has a top speed of 65 mph (105 km/h), unlike California's top speed limit of 70 mph (110 km/h), common in rural freeways. I-80 is a six- to eight-lane freeway with carpool lanes in Fairfield between exit 39A (Red Top Road) and exit 47 (Air Base Parkway).

I-80 has changed routing in the Sacramento area. Currently, the freeway runs on a northern bypass of the city, the Beltline Freeway, that was originally designated I-880. The I-80 routing alignment was moved from a route through Sacramento, now US 50 and I-80 Business (I-80 Bus), after the proposed I-80 replacement of the North Sacramento Freeway was canceled. The Beltline Freeway runs northeast from the junction of I-80 and US 50 in West Sacramento across I-5 to its junction northeast of Sacramento with I-80 Bus (which is SR 51). SR 244 heads east as a short freeway spur from that interchange.

=== Sierra Nevada ===
Crossing the Sierra Nevada, I-80 regularly gets snow at higher elevations from fall to spring. The California Department of Transportation (Caltrans) sometimes requires vehicles to use snow tires, snow chains, or other traction devices in the mountains during and after snowstorms. Checkpoints are often set up to enforce chain restrictions on vehicles bound for icy or snowy areas. When chain restrictions are in effect, vehicles must have chains on the driving wheels, except 4WD vehicles with snow tires. Additionally, during the winter season, trucks are required to carry chains whether or not controls are in force.

I-80 crosses the Sierra Nevada crest at Donner Summit (also known as Euer Saddle) at an elevation of 7,239 feet (2,206 m) westbound and 7,227 feet (2,203 m) eastbound. The Donner Summit Rest Area is located at this point. The summit is located in Nevada County, California. The pass is generally open year-round; it is plowed in winter but may temporarily close during the worst snowstorms. The older, original US 40/Lincoln Highway route over Donner Pass is about two miles (3.2 km) to the south. This highway was replaced as the official trans-Sierra route by I-80 in 1964. Although the current Donner Pass is lower, Euer Saddle was chosen for the Interstate because of more gradual approaches that aided construction to Interstate Highway standards, which do not allow the sharp curves used by the Donner Pass Road. The grade is three to six percent for 30 miles (48 km).

I-80 across the Sierra Nevada

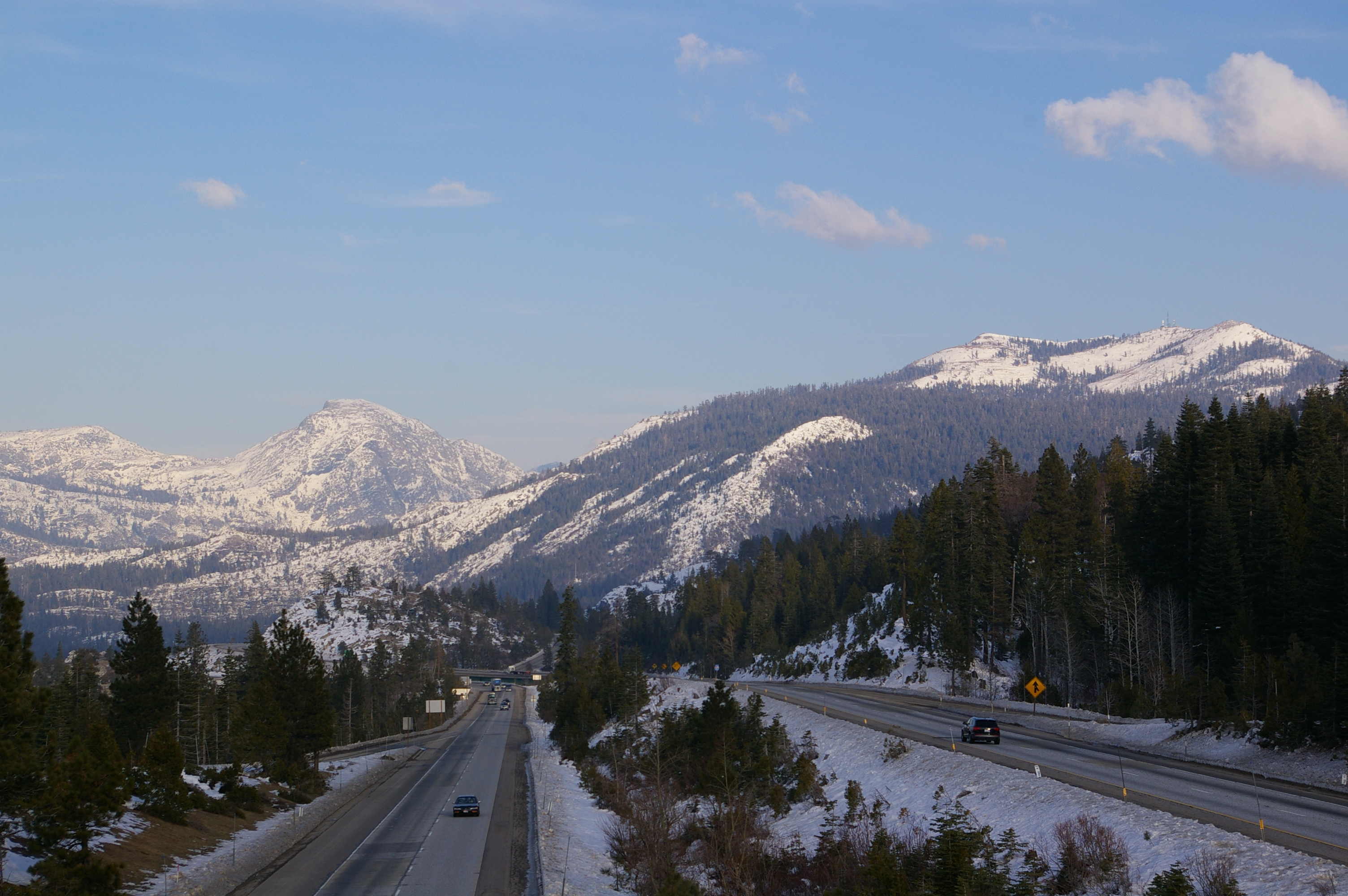
Looking northeast along I-80 in the Sierra Nevada from the Yuba Gap overpass

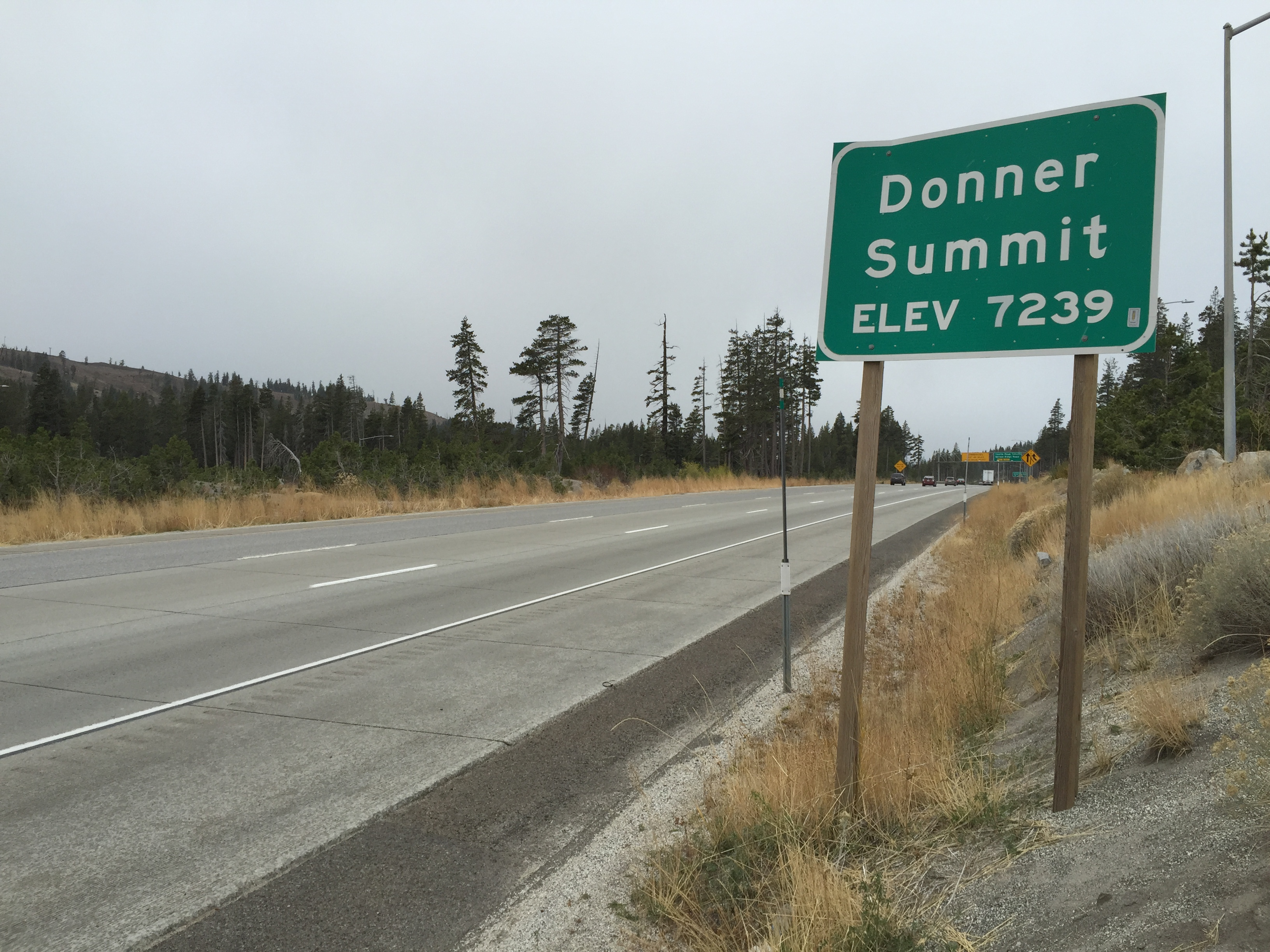
Sign for Donner Summit

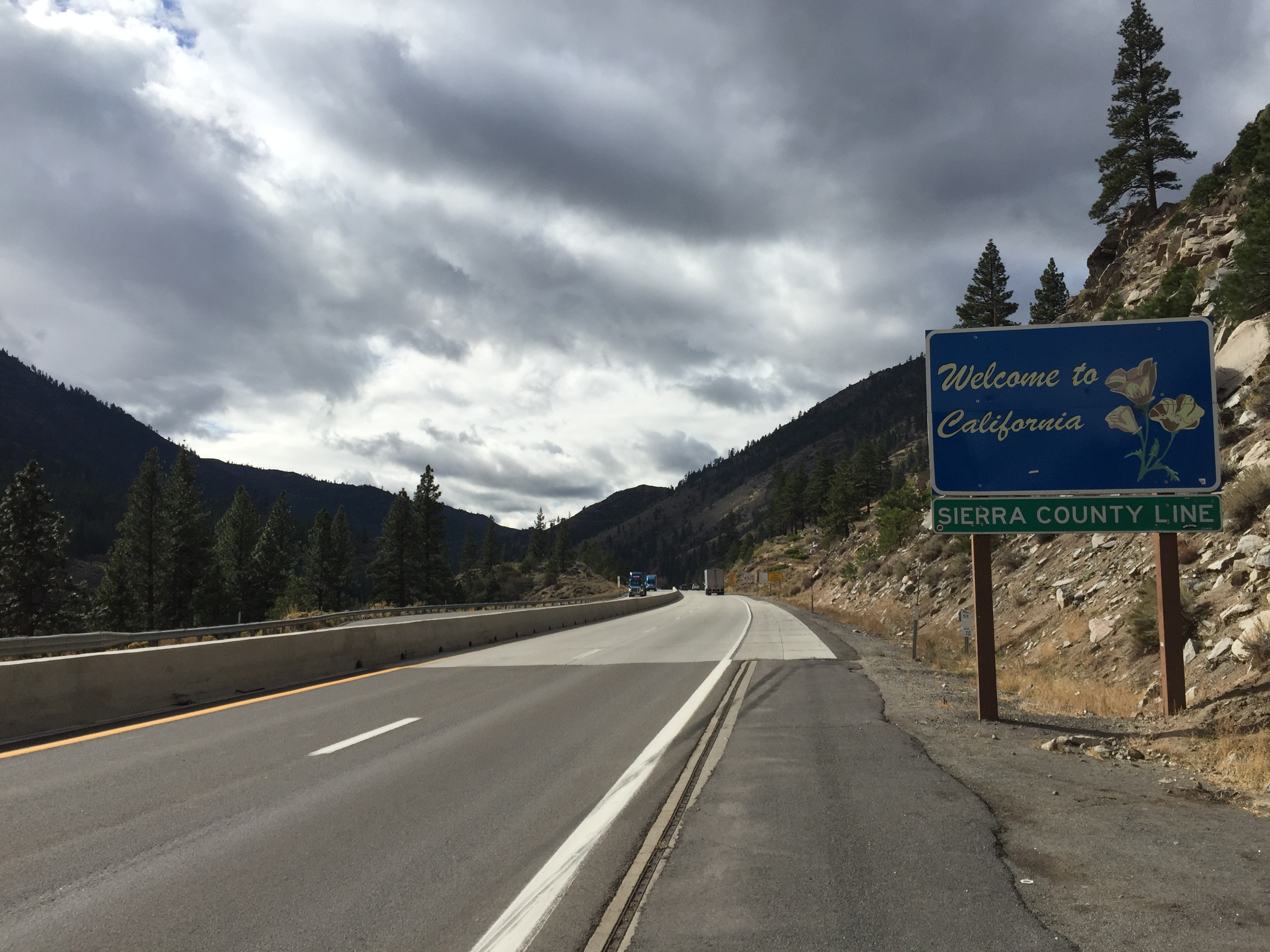
Entering California from Nevada along I-80

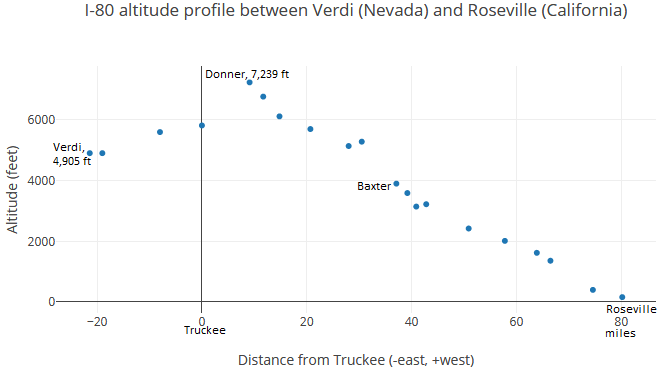
Elevations along a 100-mile (160 km) stretch of the I-80, peaking at Donner saddle

== Tolls ==
=== San Francisco–Oakland Bay Bridge ===
Tolls are collected only for westbound traffic on the San Francisco–Oakland Bay Bridge's eastern span headed to Yerba Buena Island (those just traveling on the bridge's western span between Yerba Buena Island and the main part of San Francisco are not tolled). All-electronic tolling is used on the bridge, and they can be paid by either a FasTrak transponder or license plate tolling. The high-occupancy vehicle (HOV) lane leading to the bridge requires a car with three or more people.

=== Carquinez Bridge ===
Tolls are collected only for eastbound traffic on the Carquinez Bridge headed to Vallejo. All-electronic tolling is also used on this bridge, and they can be paid by either a FasTrak transponder or license plate tolling. The high-occupancy vehicle (HOV) lane leading to the bridge requires a car with three or more people.

=== Express lanes ===
High-occupancy toll (HOT) lanes along the 18-mile (29 km) segment of I-80 between Red Top Road in Fairfield and Leisure Town Road in Vacaville opened on December 16, 2025. Construction on them began in May 2022, and included converting the existing 8-mile (13 km) carpool lanes between Red Top Road and Air Base Parkway.

As of January 2026, the HOT lanes' hours of operation is between 5:00 am and 8:00 pm; they are otherwise free and open to all vehicles at other times. Solo drivers are tolled using a congestion pricing system based on the real-time levels of traffic. Two-person carpools are charged 50 percent of the posted toll. Carpools with three or more people and motorcycles are not charged. All tolls are collected using an open road tolling system, and therefore there are no toll booths to receive cash. Each vehicle using the HOT lanes is required to carry a FasTrak Flex transponder with its switch set to indicate the number of the vehicle's occupants (1, 2, or 3+). Solo drivers may also use the FasTrak standard tag without the switch. Drivers without any FasTrak tag will be assessed a toll violation regardless of whether they qualified for free.

In May 2024, the California Transportation Commission approved $105 million for a project that would add HOT lanes between Davis and Sacramento.

== History ==
=== Historic routing ===
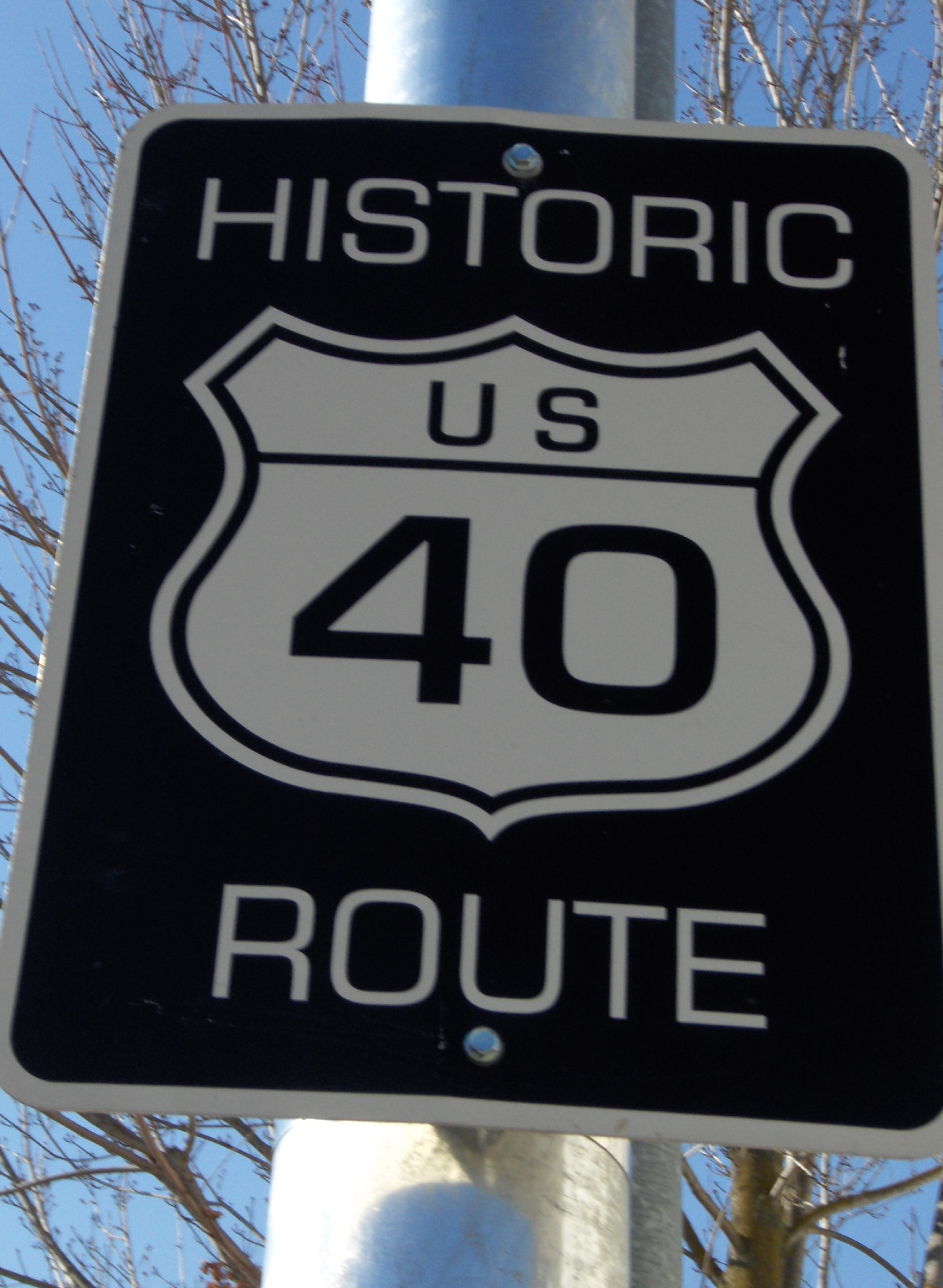
A sign in California recognizing an old alignment of US 40

U.S. Route 40
- Location: San Francisco–Nevada state line
- Existed: 1926–1964

In California I-80 was built along the line of, and eventually replaced, US 40. The US 40 designation was eliminated in the state as part of the 1964 state highway renumbering. US 40 was one of the original California routes designed in 1926, although its west end was in Oakland with US 101E (then SR 17, then I-5W, now I-580/I-880) prior to the San Francisco–Oakland Bay Bridge opening in 1936. An auto ferry ran from Berkeley to San Francisco, signed at the ferry landings for US 40. After the San Francisco–Oakland Bay Bridge's construction, US 40, along with US 50, were extended along the bridge to connect with US 101. The auto ferry service was then discontinued.

US 40 and US 50 both followed the San Francisco–Oakland Bay Bridge and the routes split on what is the present day MacArthur Maze in Oakland. US 50 continued southeast on present-day I-580 to Stockton and US 40 closely followed the route of present-day I-80. When reaching Sacramento, US 40 and US 50 rejoined, US 50 running concurrently with former US 99 from Stockton to Sacramento. US 40 then again split with US 50 in Downtown Sacramento and closely followed the route of present-day I-80 Bus, which was I-80 from 1957 to 1981, when I-80 was realigned along former I-880, routing along what was then the outskirts of Sacramento. US 40 then closely followed I-80 through the Sierra Nevada into Nevada.

A portion of old US 40 near Donner Lake is still intact and is an alternate route of I-80. It begins near Soda Springs and ends at Truckee. At one point, it travels right by Donner Lake, unlike I-80, which ascends higher in the Sierra Nevada north of historic US 40.

=== Construction ===
==== Original routing in San Francisco ====
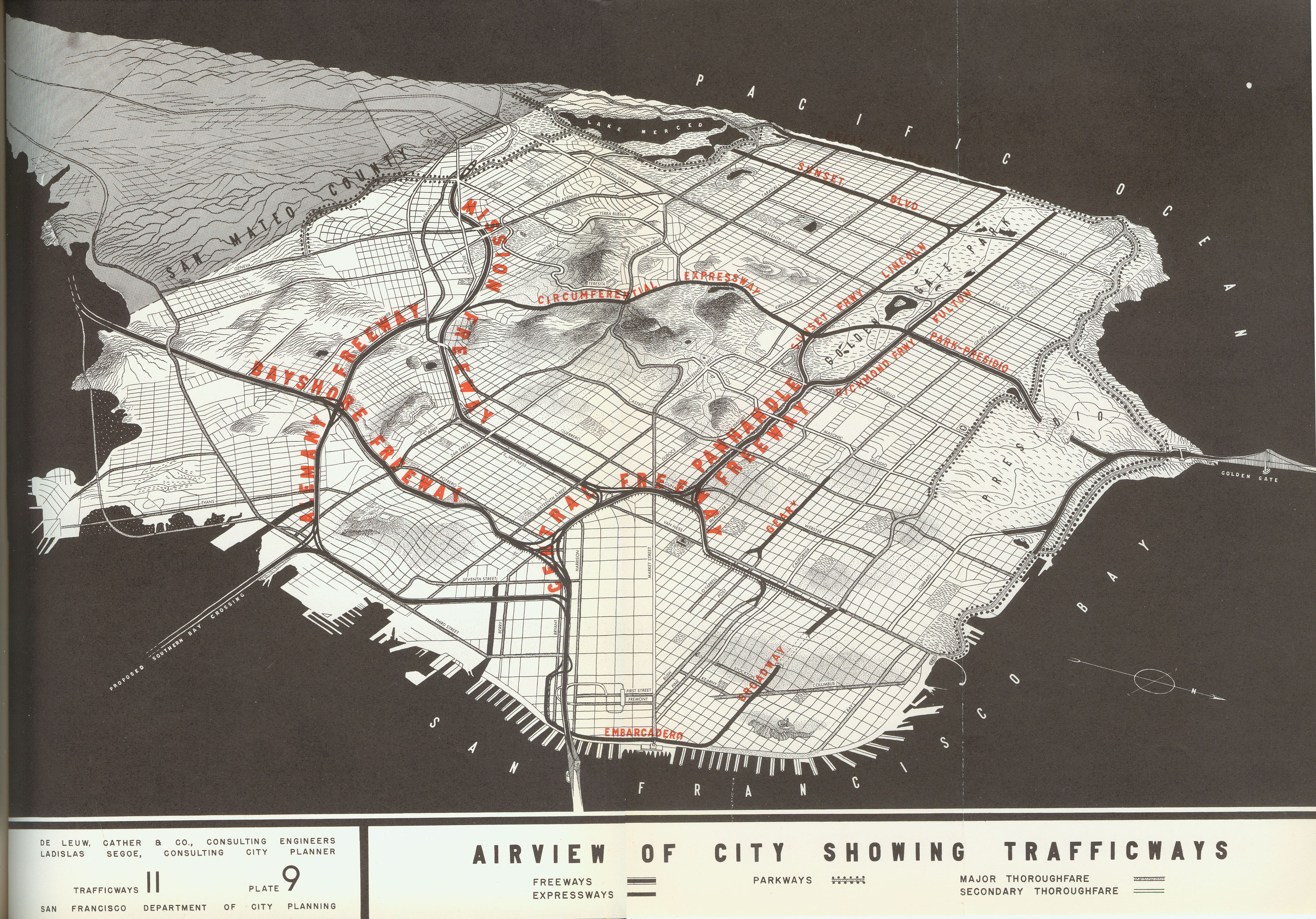
The Panhandle Freeway was in the 1948 San Francisco freeways plan.

When I-80 was first approved, it was to begin at planned I-280 (SR 1) in Golden Gate Park, head east on the never-built Panhandle Freeway, then run south and southeast on the Central Freeway (US 101) to the San Francisco Skyway. The Panhandle Freeway was to be routed through Hayes Valley, passing through Golden Gate Park and terminating at proposed I-280, now SR 1. In 1964, community oppositions forced Caltrans to abandon the Panhandle Freeway project. A January 1968 amendment moved I-280 to its present alignment, degraded I-480 to a state highway, and truncated the origin point of I-80 to the Embarcadero Freeway (then I-280, formerly I-480). Prior to that truncation, I-80 had been defined as from "Route 280 in San Francisco to the Nevada state line near Verdi, Nevada, passing near Division Street in San Francisco, passing near Oakland, via Albany, via Sacramento, passing near North Sacramento, passing near Roseville, via Auburn, via Emigrant Gap, via Truckee and via the Truckee River Canyon", and certain maps had been shown of I-80 running concurrently with US 101 to Fell Street. These changes were made on the state level later that year, but Route 80 was only truncated to US 101. (The Central Freeway remained part of US 101, and the Panhandle Freeway became SR 241. The Panhandle Freeway was later canceled in the wake of freeway revolts, and the SR 241 designation has since been reassigned to an unrelated stretch of highway in Orange County.) The San Francisco Skyway, which had already been signed as part of I-80, has remained a de facto section of I-80 to the present day and remains listed as part of the Interstate in California.

In 2000, the San Francisco Chronicle published an article about the proposed construction of a new freeway through San Francisco. According to the article, the suggested 19th Avenue tunnel would run five miles (8.0 km), from Junipero Serra Boulevard through Golden Gate Park and up to Lake Street, with exits at Brotherhood Avenue, Ocean Avenue, Quintara Street, Lincoln Way, and Geary Boulevard. The Van Ness tunnel would run almost two miles (3.2 km), from about Fell Street to Lombard Street, with exits at Broadway and Geary Boulevard. Along Oak and Fell, the planners suggested an underground road running more than 0.5 miles (0.80 km) from Laguna to Divisadero streets. However, the roads would violate the long-standing general plan for San Francisco, which calls for no new highway capacity. In March 2015, this proposed route was adopted by the California Transportation Commission (CTC).

==== Legacy ====
Prior to the construction of I-80, the US 40 corridor suffered from frequent car accidents. Reasons included the many traffic signals, yield signs, and stop signs that seemed to appear out of nowhere. Caltrans listed five intersections with high accident rates and claimed construction of I-80 would reduce such accidents. According to a study done on I-80 in Vallejo from 1955 and 1956, prior to the freeway construction, and 1957 and 1958, after the freeway was constructed, the accident rate dropped 73 percent and there were 245 fewer accidents on the then-new I-80 freeway.

The new route also made traveling across the Sierra Nevada far easier. Before construction, US 40 was a two-lane undivided highway with winding turns. This route was often closed in the winter because of the high elevation of the Donner Pass (7,239 feet (2,206 m)), and drivers had to use a much longer route to the north, US 40 Alternate (US 40 Alt), now SR 70, using the Beckwourth Pass, at an elevation of 5,221 feet (1,591 m). Driving across the Sierra Nevada became far easier with the construction of I-80 across Donner Summit since that pass is closed only for intense snowstorms.

=== Truncation of US 40 ===
In 1964, Caltrans desired to reduce the number of designated routes in the California state highways system. The Interstate Highway System, designed and built starting in 1956, was adding on to the already increased number of US Routes and state highways. In result, the 1964 renumbering truncated US 50 to West Sacramento. The entire route of US 40 was deleted in the Western United States due to the completion of I-80. Also, the number "40" was duplicated along I-40, at that time, a newly built route in Southern California. I-40 was to be numbered I-30, but the American Association of State Highway and Transportation Officials (AASHTO) rejected the numbering.

The state law authorizing the renumbering was passed on September 20, 1963. Signage changes took place by July 1, 1964, and US 40 was decommissioned. US 40 was one of the first US Routes to be decommissioned completely in California.

=== Former alignments in Sacramento ===
Interstate 880
- Location: West Sacramento–Sacramento
- Existed: 1971–1983

In the Sacramento area, I-80 has been realigned to many routes. In 1964, I-80 used the old US 40/US 99E freeway, the current I-80 Bus, while, a year later, I-80 was proposed to be realigned along a new freeway that would run south of the former I-80/I-880 northeast of Sacramento, run to south of the American River, and rejoin I-80. This was necessary because the 1964 I-80 failed to meet Interstate standards.

In 1972, I-880 was completed, while a part of the new alignment of I-80 was completed but not open to traffic, where there were a pair of long bridges to nowhere. From 1972 to 1980, I-880 began in West Sacramento as a fork from the original I-80, continues northeast over the Sacramento River to its interchange with I-5, continues east through the communities of North Sacramento and Del Paso Heights, and ends at an interchange with the Roseville Freeway (I-80). The now-designated Capital City Freeway was then the original I-80 routing, continuing southwest directly into downtown Sacramento. I-80 was then rerouted along the Beltline Freeway (the former I-880) in 1983, while the Capital City Freeway became I-80 Bus, also I-305 and SR 51. I-880 would have intersected SR 244 and then US 50, but, in 1979, the Sacramento City Council voted to delete the proposed I-80 alignment for rail transit. The constructed I-80/SR 51/SR 244 split is now used for three light rail stations. In 1980, the new I-80 alignment was deleted from the Interstate System and the long bridges to nowhere are now used for the light rail tracks on the intended eastbound overpass, while the intended westbound overpass served as a two-way vehicular connection between the light rail stations and Winters Street via a hairpin turn, but as of 2025, Jersey barriers were put in place at the end of Winters Street and the Roseville Road station end of the overpass, blocking access. SR 244 was then truncated from its proposed alignment to the only freeway section of the abandoned project in 1994, which is about a mile (1.6 km) long. In 1982–1984, I-880 was reassigned to SR 17 running from Oakland to San Jose, after two to four years of inactivity.

=== Bay Bridge replacement ===
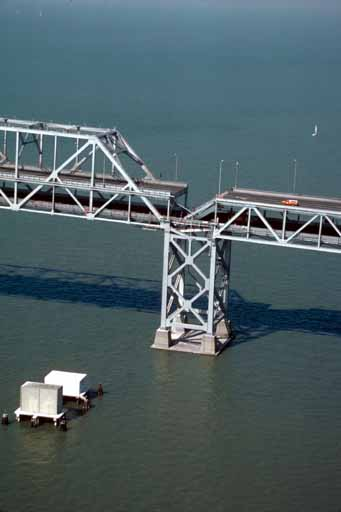
Collapsed upper deck section of the San Francisco–Oakland Bay Bridge, 1989

On October 17, 1989, the Loma Prieta earthquake was responsible for 63 deaths and 3,757 injuries. The San Francisco–Oakland Bay Bridge, which is part of I-80, suffered severe damage, as a 76-by-50-foot (23 m × 15 m) section of the upper deck on the eastern cantilever side fell onto the deck below. The quake caused the Oakland side of the bridge to shift seven inches (18 cm) to the east and caused the bolts of one section to shear off, sending the 250-short-ton (230 t; 220-long-ton) section of roadbed crashing down like a trapdoor. Caltrans removed and replaced the collapsed section and reopened the bridge on November 18.

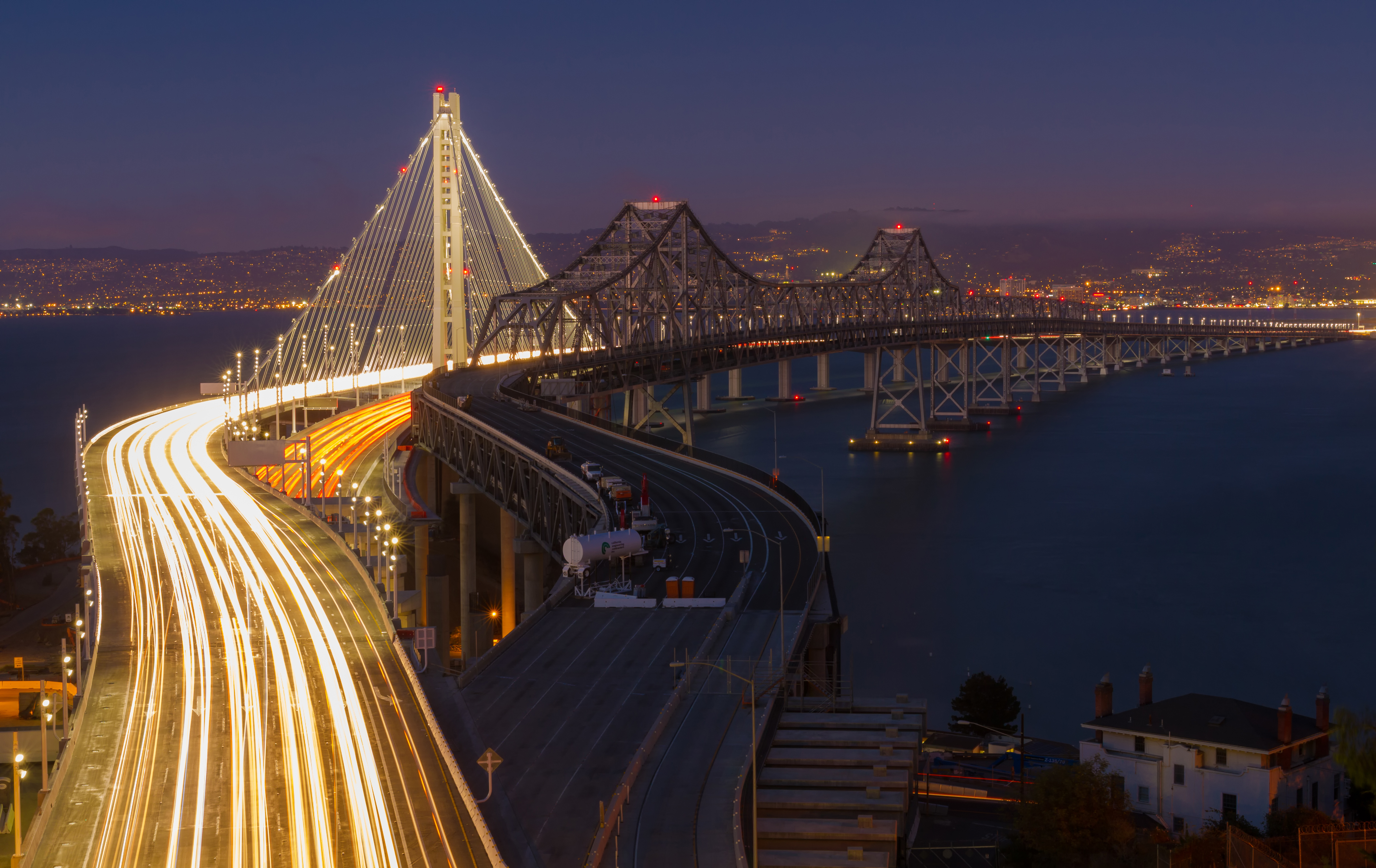
New eastern span of San Francisco–Oakland Bay Bridge, 2013

In 2002, due to the risk of a future large earthquake, Caltrans started building a new eastern span. The department advertised that the new span of the San Francisco–Oakland Bay Bridge used a new earthquake-resisting technique that would not collapse in an earthquake similar to the Loma Prieta earthquake. The new eastern span opened on September 2, 2013, at an estimated cost of $6.4 billion (equivalent to $8.47 billion in 2024).

== Exit list ==
County	Location	mi	km	Exit	Destinations	Notes
City and County of San Francisco		0.00– 0.91	0.00– 1.46	1A	US 101 south (Bayshore Freeway) – San Jose	Western terminus; US 101 north exit 433B, south exit 433
City and County of San Francisco		0.00– 0.91	0.00– 1.46	1B	US 101 north (Central Freeway) – Golden Gate Bridge	Western terminus; US 101 north exit 433B, south exit 433
City and County of San Francisco		0.00– 0.91	0.00– 1.46	1	Seventh Street	Eastbound exit and westbound entrance
City and County of San Francisco		0.91	1.46	1C	Ninth Street – Civic Center	Westbound exit and eastbound entrance
City and County of San Francisco		1.35– 2.10	2.17– 3.38	2A	Fifth Street	Westbound exit and eastbound entrance
City and County of San Francisco		1.35– 2.10	2.17– 3.38	2	Fourth Street	Eastbound exit and westbound entrance
City and County of San Francisco		1.35– 2.10	2.17– 3.38	2B	Harrison Street / Embarcadero	Westbound exit and eastbound entrance; former Fremont Street exit
City and County of San Francisco		1.35– 2.10	2.17– 3.38	2C	Fremont Street / Folsom Street	Westbound exit and eastbound entrance; provides buses only access to Salesforce Transit Center; former Main Street / SR 480 exit
San Francisco Bay		3.75	6.04	San Francisco–Oakland Bay Bridge (west span)		
City and County of San Francisco		4.18	6.73	4A	Treasure Island	Eastbound left exit and westbound entrance; connects to Treasure Island Road; scheduled to close in late May 2023 for a few of years during a seismic retrofit of the Bay Bridge western span
City and County of San Francisco		4.18	6.73	Yerba Buena Tunnel		
City and County of San Francisco		4.18	6.73	4B	Yerba Buena Island / Treasure Island	Signed as exit 4 westbound; original eastbound off-ramp was demolished as part of the Bay Bridge eastern span replacement but its replacement ramp was not completed until May 2023; connects to Macalla Road/Hillcrest Road
San Francisco Bay		5.31	8.55	San Francisco–Oakland Bay Bridge (east span; westbound toll only)		
Alameda	Oakland	7.83	12.60	8A	I-880 south (Nimitz Freeway) – Alameda, San Jose	Eastbound exit and westbound entrance; western end of MacArthur Maze; northern terminus of I-880; I-880 exit 46A; access to Oakland International Airport; former SR 17 south
Alameda	Oakland	7.83	12.60	♦	Bay Bridge Toll Plaza parking lot only	Access via the HOV lane; entrance to Bay Bridge via left turn at a stop sign at the west side of the complex
Alameda	Oakland	7.83	12.60	8A	West Grand Avenue, Maritime Street	Westbound signage; eastbound access via exit 8A/I-880; last free exit for westbound traffic
Alameda	Oakland	8.13	13.08	8B	I-580 east (MacArthur Freeway) to SR 24 – Downtown Oakland, Hayward, Stockton	Eastbound signage; I-580 west exit 19A
Alameda	Oakland	8.13	13.08	8B	I-580 east (MacArthur Freeway) / I-880 south (Nimitz Freeway) – Downtown Oakland, Hayward, Stockton, Alameda, San Jose	Western end of I-580 overlap; westbound left exit and eastbound entrance; eastern end of MacArthur Maze; northern terminus of I-880; I-880 exit 46B; I-880 is former SR 17 south; access to Oakland International Airport
Alameda	Emeryville	9.28	14.93	9	Powell Street – Emeryville	No eastbound exit from I-880 north
Alameda	Emeryville–Berkeley line	9.85	15.85	10	SR 13 (Ashby Avenue) / Shellmound Street	Northern terminus of SR 13; Shellmound Street accessible eastbound only; planned to be converted from a three-legged interchange to a diamond interchange by 2030
Alameda	Berkeley	11.15	17.94	11	University Avenue – Berkeley	Serves UC Berkeley
Alameda	Berkeley	11.98	19.28	12	Gilman Street	Converted to a double roundabout interchange in 2025
Alameda	Albany	12.63	20.33	13A	Buchanan Street – Albany	Eastbound signage; partially rebuilt as part of 1990s reconstruction of the Hoffman Split interchange
Alameda	Albany	12.91	20.78	13B	I-580 west – Point Richmond, San Rafael	Eastern end of I-580 overlap; Hoffman Split interchange; eastbound exit and westbound entrance; former SR 17 north
Alameda	Albany	12.91	20.78	13	Albany	Westbound signage; connects to Cleveland Avenue
Alameda	Albany	12.91	20.78	—	Pierce Street	Former eastbound exit and entrance; demolished during the 1990s reconstruction of the Hoffman Split interchange
Contra Costa	Richmond	13.59	21.87	14A	Central Avenue – El Cerrito	El Cerrito not signed westbound
Contra Costa	Richmond	14.36	23.11	14B	Carlson Boulevard	
Contra Costa	Richmond–El Cerrito line	15.41	24.80	15	Potrero Avenue	Eastbound exit and westbound entrance
Contra Costa	Richmond	15.41	24.80	15	Cutting Boulevard (SR 123)	Westbound exit and eastbound entrance; northern terminus of SR 123
Contra Costa	Richmond			♦	Cutting Boulevard	HOV access only; westbound left exit and eastbound entrance
Contra Costa	Richmond	15.98	25.72	16A	Macdonald Avenue	Eastbound exit and westbound entrance
Contra Costa	Richmond	16.33	26.28	16B	San Pablo Avenue, Barrett Avenue	Signed as exit 16 westbound; Barrett Avenue formerly signed as Central Richmond
Contra Costa	Richmond	17.14	27.58	17	Solano Avenue	Eastbound exit and westbound entrance
Contra Costa	Richmond	17.14	27.58	17	McBryde Avenue	Westbound exit only
Contra Costa	San Pablo	17.69	28.47	18	San Pablo Dam Road	
Contra Costa	Richmond	18.61	29.95	19A	El Portal Drive	
Contra Costa	Richmond	19.34	31.12	19B	Hilltop Mall, Auto Plaza	Formerly signed as Hilltop Drive
Contra Costa	Richmond–Pinole line			♦	Richmond Parkway	HOV access only; eastbound left exit and westbound entrance
Contra Costa	Pinole	20.10	32.35	20	Richmond Parkway, Fitzgerald Drive to I-580 west	Unconstructed SR 93
Contra Costa	Pinole	20.96	33.73	21	Appian Way	
Contra Costa	Pinole	21.87	35.20	22	Pinole Valley Road	
Contra Costa	Hercules	23.41	37.67	23	SR 4 east – Hercules, Stockton	Eastbound signage; no westbound access to SR 4 east; western terminus of SR 4; SR 4 exit 1B
Contra Costa	Hercules	23.41	37.67	23	Hercules	Westbound signage
Contra Costa	Hercules	24.06	38.72	24	Willow Avenue – Rodeo	
Contra Costa		26.11	42.02	26	Cummings Skyway to SR 4 east – Martinez, Concord	
Contra Costa		26.88	43.26	27	Pomona Street – Crockett, Port Costa	Last free exit for eastbound traffic
Carquinez Strait		27.49	44.24	Carquinez Bridge (eastbound toll only)		
Solano	Vallejo	28.64– 28.74	46.09– 46.25	29A	SR 29 north (Sonoma Boulevard)	Eastbound exit and westbound entrance; southern terminus of SR 29
Solano	Vallejo	28.64– 28.74	46.09– 46.25	29A	Maritime Academy Drive	Westbound exit and entrance
Solano	Vallejo	28.64– 28.74	46.09– 46.25	29B	Sequoia Avenue	Eastbound exit only
Solano	Vallejo	29.27	47.11	29C	Magazine Street	Signed as exit 29B westbound
Solano	Vallejo	29.71	47.81	30A	I-780 east to I-680 – Benicia, Martinez	Provides exit to Curtola Parkway; I-780 is former I-680 south; western terminus of I-780; I-780 exit 1A-B
Solano	Vallejo	29.93	48.17	30B	Frontage Road (to Benicia Road)	Eastbound exit only; former SR 141
Solano	Vallejo	30.37	48.88	30C	Georgia Street – Central Vallejo	Signed as exit 30B westbound
Solano	Vallejo	30.72	49.44	31A	Springs Road, Solano Avenue	
Solano	Vallejo	30.99	49.87	31B	Tennessee Street – Mare Island	
Solano	Vallejo	31.92	51.37	32	Redwood Parkway, Redwood Street	Signed as exits 32A (east) and 32B (west) eastbound
Solano	Vallejo	33.12	53.30	33	SR 37 west / Columbus Parkway – Napa, Novato, San Rafael, Auto Mall	Signed as exits 33A (Columbus Parkway) and 33B (SR 37) westbound; eastern terminus of SR 37; SR 37 exit 21A to I-80 west
Solano	Vallejo	34.12	54.91	Hunter Hill Rest Area (westbound only)		
Napa–Solano county line	Vallejo	35.60	57.29	36	American Canyon Road	
Solano	Fairfield	38.89	62.59	39A	Red Top Road	Signed as exit 39 eastbound
Solano	Fairfield	38.89	62.59	—	Solano I-80 Express Lanes	West end of express lanes; opened on December 16, 2025
Solano	Fairfield	38.89	62.59	39B	SR 12 west – Napa, Sonoma	Western end of SR 12 overlap; eastbound access is via exit 40
Solano	Fairfield	40.34– 40.98	64.92– 65.95	40	Green Valley Road to SR 12 west	Westbound access is part of exit 41
Solano	Fairfield	40.34– 40.98	64.92– 65.95	40	I-680 south – Benicia, Martinez, San Jose	Former SR 21; northern terminus of I-680; I-680 north exits 71A-B
Solano	Fairfield	40.34– 40.98	64.92– 65.95	41	Suisun Valley Road, Pittman Road, Green Valley Road	Green Valley Road not signed eastbound; Pittman Road not signed westbound
Solano	Fairfield	41.81	67.29	Weigh station		
Solano	Fairfield	43.30	69.68	43	SR 12 east – Suisun City, Rio Vista	Eastern end of SR 12 overlap; westbound access is via exit 43
Solano	Fairfield	43.66	70.26	44A	Suisun Parkway to SR 12 east – Rio Vista	Signed as exit 43 westbound
Solano	Fairfield	44.72	71.97	44B	West Texas Street, Rockville Road	Signed as exit 44 westbound; Rockville Road not signed eastbound
Solano	Fairfield	45.41	73.08	45	Travis Boulevard	
Solano	Fairfield	46.68	75.12	47	Waterman Boulevard, Air Base Parkway – Travis AFB	Signed as exits 47A (Air Base Parkway) and 47B (Waterman Boulevard) westbound
Solano	Fairfield	48.43	77.94	48	North Texas Street, Manuel Campos Parkway	
Solano	Vacaville	50.64	81.50	51A	Lagoon Valley Road, Cherry Glen Road	
Solano	Vacaville	51.16	82.33	51B	Peña Adobe Road	
Solano	Vacaville	52.16	83.94	52	Cherry Glen Road	Westbound exit only
Solano	Vacaville	52.81	84.99	53	Alamo Drive, Merchant Street	
Solano	Vacaville	53.51	86.12	54A	Davis Street	
Solano	Vacaville	53.97	86.86	54B	Peabody Road, Mason Street – Elmira	
Solano	Vacaville	54.73	88.08	55	Monte Vista Avenue, Allison Drive, Nut Tree Parkway	
Solano	Vacaville	55.86	89.90	56	I-505 north – Winters, Redding	Southern terminus of I-505; I-505 exits 1A-B
Solano	Vacaville			—	Solano I-80 Express Lanes	East end of express lanes; opened on December 16, 2025
Solano	Vacaville	57.34	92.28	57	Leisure Town Road, Vaca Valley Parkway	
Solano	Vacaville	58.85	94.71	59	Meridian Road, Weber Road	
Solano	Vacaville	60.11	96.74	60	Midway Road, Lewis Road	
Solano	Dixon	63.02	101.42	63	Dixon Avenue, West A Street	
Solano	Dixon	64.39	103.63	64	Pitt School Road	
Solano	Dixon	65.70	105.73	66A	SR 113 south (First Street) / Currey Road – Dixon	Western end of SR 113 overlap; signed as exit 66 eastbound
Solano	Dixon	65.70	105.73	66B	Milk Farm Road	Westbound exit only
Solano	Dixon	67.24	108.21	67	Pedrick Road (CR E7)	
Solano		68.74	110.63	69	Kidwell Road	
Solano		70.18	112.94	70	SR 113 north (Vic Fazio Highway) – Woodland	Eastern end of SR 113 overlap; SR 113 exits 26A-B
Solano		71.01	114.28	71	UC Davis	Connects to Old Davis Road
Solano				—	Yolo I-80 Express Lanes	West end of proposed Express Lanes
Yolo	Davis	72.43	116.56	72	Richards Boulevard – Downtown Davis	Signed as exits 72A (south) and 72B (north) westbound; planned to be converted from a partial cloverleaf interchange to a diamond interchange.
Yolo	Davis	73.05	117.56	73	Olive Drive	Westbound exit only; former US 40 west / US 99W north; planned to be demolished as part of the Richards Boulevard project
Yolo	Davis	74.88	120.51	75	Mace Boulevard (CR E6)	
Yolo		78.00	125.53	78	Road 32A, East Chiles Road	
Yolo	Yolo Bypass	78.02– 79.46	125.56– 127.88	Yolo Causeway		
Yolo	West Sacramento	81.39	130.98	81	West Capitol Avenue, Enterprise Boulevard	West Capitol Avenue is former US 40 east / US 99W south (1926–1955)
Yolo	West Sacramento	82.12	132.16	82	US 50 east (I-305 east / I-80 BL east (Capital City Freeway)) – Sacramento, South Lake Tahoe	Eastbound exit and westbound entrance are on the left; former US 40 east / US 99W south (1955–1964) / I-80 east; western terminus of US 50 and unsigned I-305; US 50 exit 1
Yolo	West Sacramento			—	US 50 Express Lanes east	Proposed; Express Lanes access only
Yolo	West Sacramento	83.43	134.27	83	Reed Avenue (SR 84)	
Sacramento	Sacramento	85.28	137.24	85	West El Camino Avenue	
Sacramento	Sacramento			—	Yolo I-80 Express Lanes	East end of proposed Express Lanes
Sacramento	Sacramento	86.48	139.18	86	I-5 to SR 99 – Los Angeles, Redding	I-5 exit 522
Sacramento	Sacramento	87.57	140.93	88	Truxel Road	
Sacramento	Sacramento	88.90	143.07	89	Northgate Boulevard	
Sacramento	Sacramento	90.04	144.91	90	Norwood Avenue	
Sacramento	Sacramento	91.56	147.35	91	Raley Boulevard, Marysville Boulevard – Del Paso Heights	
Sacramento	Sacramento	92.61	149.04	92	Winters Street	
Sacramento	Sacramento	93.34	150.22	93	Longview Drive	
Sacramento	North Highlands	94.28	151.73	94	Light Rail Stations (Roseville Road, Watt/I-80 West, and Watt/I-80)	Westbound left exit and eastbound left entrance; also accessible as part of exit 93 westbound; due to the nature of the left hand ramps, all vehicles are allowed access to the HOV lanes for 0.5 miles (0.80 km) to and from the ramps
Sacramento	North Highlands	94.28	151.73	94A	Watt Avenue	Westbound access via exit 95; western terminus of unsigned SR 244
Sacramento	North Highlands	94.28	151.73	94B	Auburn Boulevard (SR 244)	Westbound access via exit 95; western terminus of unsigned SR 244
Sacramento	North Highlands	94.94	152.79	95	I-80 BL west (Capital City Freeway) to SR 99 south – Sacramento	Westbound exit and eastbound entrance; eastbound exit is part of exit 94A; former I-80 west
Sacramento	North Highlands	95.99	154.48	96	Madison Avenue	
Sacramento	Foothill Farms–Carmichael line	97.97	157.67	98	Greenback Lane, Elkhorn Boulevard (CR E14)	
Sacramento	Citrus Heights	99.55	160.21	Weigh station		
Sacramento	Citrus Heights	100.19	161.24	100	Antelope Road	
Sacramento–Placer county line	Citrus Heights–Roseville line	101.79	163.82	102	Riverside Avenue, Auburn Boulevard – Roseville, Citrus Heights	Former US 40 / US 99E / SR 65
Placer	Roseville	103.91	167.23	103	Douglas Boulevard, Sunrise Avenue (CR E2)	Signed as exits 103A (east) and 103B (west) eastbound
Placer	Roseville	104.59	168.32	105A	Atlantic Street, Taylor Road, Eureka Road	Taylor Road not signed eastbound; signed as exits 105A (Eureka Road) and 105B (Atlantic Street, Taylor Road) westbound
Placer	Roseville	105.18	169.27	105B	Taylor Road, Pacific Street	Westbound exit is via exit 105A
Placer	Roseville–Rocklin line	106.68	171.68	106	SR 65 north – Lincoln, Marysville	Southern terminus of northern section of SR 65; SR 65 exits 306A-B
Placer	Rocklin	107.58	173.13	108	Rocklin Road	
Placer	Rocklin	108.94	175.32	109	Sierra College Boulevard (CR E3)	
Placer	Loomis	110.24	177.41	110	Horseshoe Bar Road	
Placer	Penryn	111.87	180.04	112	Penryn Road – Penryn	
Placer	Newcastle	115.33	185.61	115	Newcastle Road – Newcastle	
Placer	Newcastle	116.23	187.05	116	SR 193 west – Lincoln	Western end of SR 193 overlap
Placer	Auburn	118.43	190.59	118	Ophir Road	Westbound exit and eastbound entrance
Placer	Auburn	118.72	191.06	119A	Maple Street, Nevada Street	
Placer	Auburn	119.08	191.64	119B	SR 49 north (Grass Valley Highway) – Grass Valley	Western end of SR 49 overlap
Placer	Auburn	119.35	192.08	119C	SR 49 south (SR 193 east, Elm Avenue) – Placerville	Eastern end of SR 49 / SR 193 overlap
Placer	Auburn–North Auburn line	120.46	193.86	120	Lincoln Way, Russell Road	No eastbound entrance
Placer	North Auburn	120.98	194.70	121	Auburn Ravine Road – Foresthill	
Placer	North Auburn	121.66	195.79	122	Bowman	Connects to Bowman Road
Placer		122.64	197.37	123	Bell Road	
Placer		123.73	199.12	124	Dry Creek Road	
Placer		124.94	201.07	125	Clipper Gap, Meadow Vista	Connects to Placer Hills Road
Placer		127.66	205.45	128	Applegate	Connects to Crother Road
Placer		128.89	207.43	129	Heather Glen	Connects to Applegate Road and Geisendorfer Road
Placer		130.09	209.36	130	West Paoli Lane	
Placer		130.83	210.55	131	Weimar Cross Road	
Placer	Colfax	133.30	214.53	133	Canyon Way, Placer Hills Road	
Placer	Colfax	134.63	216.67	135	SR 174 – Colfax, Grass Valley	Southern terminus of SR 174
Placer		139.85	225.07	139	Rollins Lake Road, Magra Road	Westbound exit and entrance
Placer		139.85	225.07	140	Secret Town Road, Rollins Lake Road	Eastbound signage
Placer		139.85	225.07	140	Magra Road, Secret Town Road	Westbound signage
Placer		142.88	229.94	143	Magra Road – Gold Run	
Placer		143.25	230.54	Gold Run Rest Area		
Placer		143.70	231.26	144	Gold Run	Westbound exit and eastbound entrance; connects to Gold Run Road and Hi Sierra Drive
Placer		144.67	232.82	145	Dutch Flat	Connects to Canyon Creek Road and Ridge Road
Placer		146.25	235.37	146	Alta	Connects to Alta Bonnynook Road and Morton Road
Placer	Alta	147.82	237.89	148A	Crystal Springs	Connects to Crystal Springs Road
Placer		148.44	238.89	148B	Baxter	Connects to Baxter Road
Placer		150.50	242.21	150	Drum Forebay Road	
Placer		154.97	249.40	155	Blue Canyon	Connects to Blue Canyon Road
Placer		156.32	251.57	156	Nyack Road	
Placer		157.58	253.60	158A	Emigrant Gap	Signed as exit 158 westbound; connects to Emigrant Gap Road
Placer		158.36	254.86	158B	Laing Road	Eastbound exit only
Nevada		160.41	258.15	160	Yuba Gap	Connects to Lake Valley Road
Nevada		161.04	259.17	161	SR 20 west – Nevada City, Grass Valley	Eastern terminus of SR 20
Nevada		163.67	263.40	164	Eagle Lakes Road	
Placer		164.88	265.35	165	Cisco Grove	Connects to Cisco Road
Placer		166.16	267.41	166	Big Bend	Eastbound exit only; connects to Hampshire Rocks Road
Placer		167.70	269.89	168	Rainbow Road – Big Bend	
Placer	Kingvale	170.61	274.57	171	Kingvale	Connects to Donner Pass Road
Nevada	Soda Springs	173.84	279.77	174	Soda Springs, Norden	Connects to Donner Pass Road; former US 40
Nevada		176.23	283.61	176	Boreal Ridge Road – Castle Peak	
Nevada		176.66	284.31	Donner Summit Rest Area		
Nevada		176.90– 176.99	284.69– 284.84	Donner Summit, elevation 7,227 feet (2,203 m) eastbound, 7,239 feet (2,206 m) westbound		
Nevada	Truckee	180.16	289.94	180	Donner Lake	Connects to Donner Lake Road
Nevada	Truckee	183.80	295.80	184	Donner Pass Road	Former US 40
Nevada	Truckee	184.76	297.34	185	SR 89 south – Lake Tahoe	Western end of SR 89 overlap
Nevada	Truckee	185.57	298.65	186	Central Truckee	No eastbound entrance; connects to Donner Pass Road; former US 40
Nevada	Truckee	186.87	300.74	188A	Truckee	Eastbound exit and westbound entrance; connects to Truckee Way
Nevada	Truckee	187.19	301.25	188B	SR 89 north / SR 267 south – Sierraville, Lake Tahoe	Eastern end of SR 89 overlap; signed as exit 188 westbound; northern terminus of SR 267
Nevada	Truckee	189.98	305.74	190	Overland Trail	Formerly Prosser Village Road
Nevada	Truckee	190.96	307.32	Agricultural Inspection Station (westbound only)		
Nevada	Truckee	194.11	312.39	194	Hirschdale Road	
Nevada	Floriston	198.99	320.24	199	Floriston	Connects to Floriston Way
Nevada		201.19	323.78	201	Farad	Connects to Mystic Road
Sierra		205.07	330.03		I-80 east – Reno	Continuation into Nevada
1.000 mi = 1.609 km; 1.000 km = 0.621 mi: Closed/former; Concurrency terminus; Electronic toll collection; HOV only; Incomplete access; Unopened

== Related routes ==
The following auxiliary Interstate Highways are associated with I-80 in California, all in the San Francisco Bay Area:

- I-280 runs from US 101 in San Jose north to San Francisco, running just to the west of the larger cities of San Francisco Peninsula for most of its route.
- I-380 connects I-280 in San Bruno with US 101 near San Francisco International Airport.
- I-580 runs from US 101 in San Rafael east to I-5 at a point south of Tracy in the Central Valley.
- I-680 runs from US 101 in San Jose north to I-80 in Fairfield, curving around the inland areas of the East Bay.
- I-780 connects I-80 in Vallejo with I-680 in Benicia.
- I-880 connects I-280 in San Jose with I-80 and I-580 in Oakland, running parallel to the eastern shore of San Francisco Bay for most of its route.
- I-980 connects I-880 with I-580 in Oakland.

In addition, I-238 may be considered associated with I-80 even though it does not follow established rules for numbering Interstates as there is no I-38. As it connects I-580 in Castro Valley with I-880 in San Leandro, it would normally also use a three-digit number ending in 80. But, of the nine possible numbers, two (180 and 480) were in use by State Routes (the latter an Interstate until 1968 though SR 480 was deleted in 1991), and the remainder were already in use by the other aforementioned auxiliary routes. (I-880 was designated at the same time as I-238.)

One business loop of I-80 exists in California, running along a former alignment through Sacramento.

Three former auxiliary Interstate Highway routes exist:

- I-180 was the designation for the segment along the Richmond–San Rafael Bridge between 1978 and 1983 before it became a northern extension on I-580.
- I-480 was planned to run in San Francisco between I-80 near the San Francisco–Oakland Bay Bridge and US 101 near the Golden Gate Bridge. Only the elevated double-decker Embarcadero Freeway and the partly elevated Doyle Drive approach to the Golden Gate Bridge were completed before freeway revolts halted any construction of the middle section. The Interstate designation only lasted from 1955 to 1965, and the Embarcadero Freeway was demolished after the 1989 Loma Prieta earthquake.
- I-880 was the original route designation of the northern bypass freeway in Sacramento before I-80 was rerouted along it in 1983.

== See also ==
- 1999 Loomis truck robbery

Interstate 80
Previous state: Terminus	California	Next state: Nevada
