= Capital SouthEast Connector =

Planned expressway in the Sacramento metropolitan area

Route information
- Maintained by Capital SouthEast Connector Joint Powers Authority (JPA)
- Length: 34 mi (55 km)
- History: Under construction

Major junctions
- West end: I-5 in Sacramento County
- East end: US 50 in El Dorado County

Location
- Country: United States
- State: California
- Counties: Sacramento, El Dorado

Highway system
- County routes in California

The Capital SouthEast Connector is a 34-mile (55 km) planned expressway in California running from Interstate 5 (I-5) to U.S. Route 50 (US 50). The route runs through Sacramento County, Elk Grove, Rancho Cordova, Folsom, and El Dorado County. This project serves as an alternative route to the Greater Sacramento region's current highway system. It consists of four lanes of thoroughfare and expressway.

== Route description ==
As planned, the Capital SouthEast Connector (from the west) begins at the West Side (I-5) Freeway/Hood Franklin Road interchange as a four-lane expressway heading east until the intersection with Bruceville Road, where it connects with the existing Kammerer Road as a four- to six-lane thoroughfare. The Capital SouthEast Connector continues over the South Sacramento (99) Freeway to the existing Grant Line Road interchange and continues northeast along Grant Line Road as a four- to six-lane thoroughfare. As it reaches the intersection of Bond Road, this section of the connector becomes the Sheldon Section until it reaches the Calvine Road intersection. This section is also known as the Special Section due to its sensitivity and proximity with the Sheldon community and adjacent homes, development, and business properties; as of 2019, this section was still under environmental and design review and will be one of the last segments completed of the connector. Heading northeast from Calvine Road towards Rancho Cordova, this section is designated as a four-lane high-speed expressway (speed limits up to 65 mph (105 km/h)) with grade-separated interchanges. As the connector reaches towards the Sacramento–El Dorado county line, it returns to a six-lane thoroughfare ending at the Silva Valley Parkway Interchange.

== History ==
After the California Department of Transportation (Caltrans) abandoned the proposed California State Route 143 (SR 143), SR 148, and the extension of SR 65 (from Roseville/I-80 south to Fresno) due to an anti-freeway revolt from local residents during 1970–90, the Sacramento Area Council of Government (SACOG) proposed a new expressway in southeast Sacramento County to alleviate traffic congestion along SR 99 and US 50. With increased suburban development in Elk Grove, Folsom, and El Dorado County, travel time and delays have caused concerns with local residents prompting SACOG to initiate a much needed alternative route from Sacramento's current freeway systems (which all connect to Downtown Sacramento). This resulted in the formation of the Capital SouthEast Connector Joint Powers Authority (JPA) in December 2006. Along with the board members of the JPA, Elk Grove, Rancho Cordova, Folsom, Sacramento County, and El Dorado County "formalized their collaboration to proceed with planning, environmental review, engineering design and development of what was initially called the Elk Grove-Rancho Cordova-El Dorado Connector Project." Currently known as the Capital SouthEast Connector, some initial work has begun on the northern end of the project at the Silva Valley interchange in El Dorado County as well as the Grantline interchange at SR 99. In February 2014, a two-mile (3.2 km), four-lane segment between White Rock Road and Prairie City Road was completed as one of the earliest stages of the new expressway. The JPA has made it a priority to start from the west (Elk Grove) and east (El Dorado County and Folsom) ends of the project until both ends meet. Phase I of the project is expected to be completed by 2025, pending financing; phase II within 2030–40.

=== Timeline ===
Note: Completion dates listed are projected for Phase I only and are subject to change.

==== Segment A (expressway/thoroughfare) ====
- A1 & A2: I-5/Hood Franklin interchange to SR 99/Grant Line interchange, 2019

==== Segment B (thoroughfare) ====
- B1: SR 99/Grant Line interchange to Waterman Road, 2015
- B2: Waterman to Bradshaw Road, 2020
- B3: Bradshaw Road to Bond Road, 2022

==== Segment C (Special Section/Sheldon Section) ====
- C: Bond Road to Calvine Road, 2022

==== Segment D (expressway) ====
- D1: Calvine Road to SR 16 (Jackson Road), 2022
- D2: SR 16 (Jackson Road) to White Rock Road, 2020
- D3 & E1: Prairie City Road to Latrobe Road, 2018

==== Segment E (expressway/thoroughfare) ====
- E2: Latrobe Road to US 50/Silva Valley Parkway interchange, 2022
- E3: US 50/Silva Valley Parkway Interchange, 2016

== See also ==
- Placer Parkway
