= Blue Canyon =

Blue Canyon may refer to:

== Locations ==
- Blue Canyon, California
  - Blue Canyon–Nyack Airport
- Blue Canyon, Washington
- Blue Canyon Wind Farm, Oklahoma
- The northwest drainage of Black Mesa, in northeast Arizona
- A lava field near Fort Defiance, Arizona

== Sports venues ==
- Blue Canyon Country Club, a golf facility in Phuket, Thailand

== Companies ==
- Blue Canyon Technologies, a satellite manufacturer bought by Raytheon Intelligence & Space in 2020

== See also ==
- Canyon Blue (N536JB), the name of the aircraft involved in the JetBlue Airways Flight 292 incident on 21 September 2005
