= KBLU =

KBLU may refer to:

- KBLU (AM), a radio station (560 AM) licensed to serve Yuma, Arizona, United States
- KBLU-LP, a low-power radio station (92.3 FM) licensed to serve Logan, Utah, United States
- Blue Canyon–Nyack Airport (ICAO code KBLU)
