= Placer Parkway =

Proposed highway in Roseville, California

Placer Parkway is a 15-mile (24 km) proposed highway in the U.S. state of California, in the greater Sacramento area. The route would connect Highway 99 near the Sacramento International Airport to Highway 65 just south of Lincoln and north of Rocklin at the Whitney Ranch Parkway interchange. The highway would traverse through portions of Sutter and Placer counties in primarily agricultural land. It is expected to be an alternate route for Interstate 80, in hopes of easing traffic on the latter.

The first phase of the project, an environmental study, was unanimously approved by the Placer County Board of Supervisors in 2015.

== See also ==
- Capital SouthEast Connector
