= Big Bend, Placer County, California =

Unincorporated community in California, United States

Big Bend - Rainbow
- Unincorporated community
- Location in California Big Bend - Rainbow (the United States)
- Coordinates: 39°18′20″N 120°31′05″W
- Country: United States
- State: California
- County: Placer County
- Elevation: 5,738 ft (1,749 m)

Big Bend or Rainbow is an unincorporated community in Placer County, California. Big Bend is located on the South Yuba River, 1 mile (1.6 km) east-southeast of Cisco Grove. It lies at an elevation of 5738 feet (1749 m).

Big Bend was the site of a travelers' inn and grocery store on the Lincoln Highway. The historic Rainbow Lodge is nearby. Today Big Bend consists of a US Forest Service campground, a fire station, and a few vacation homes.
