= Pacific Park Plaza =

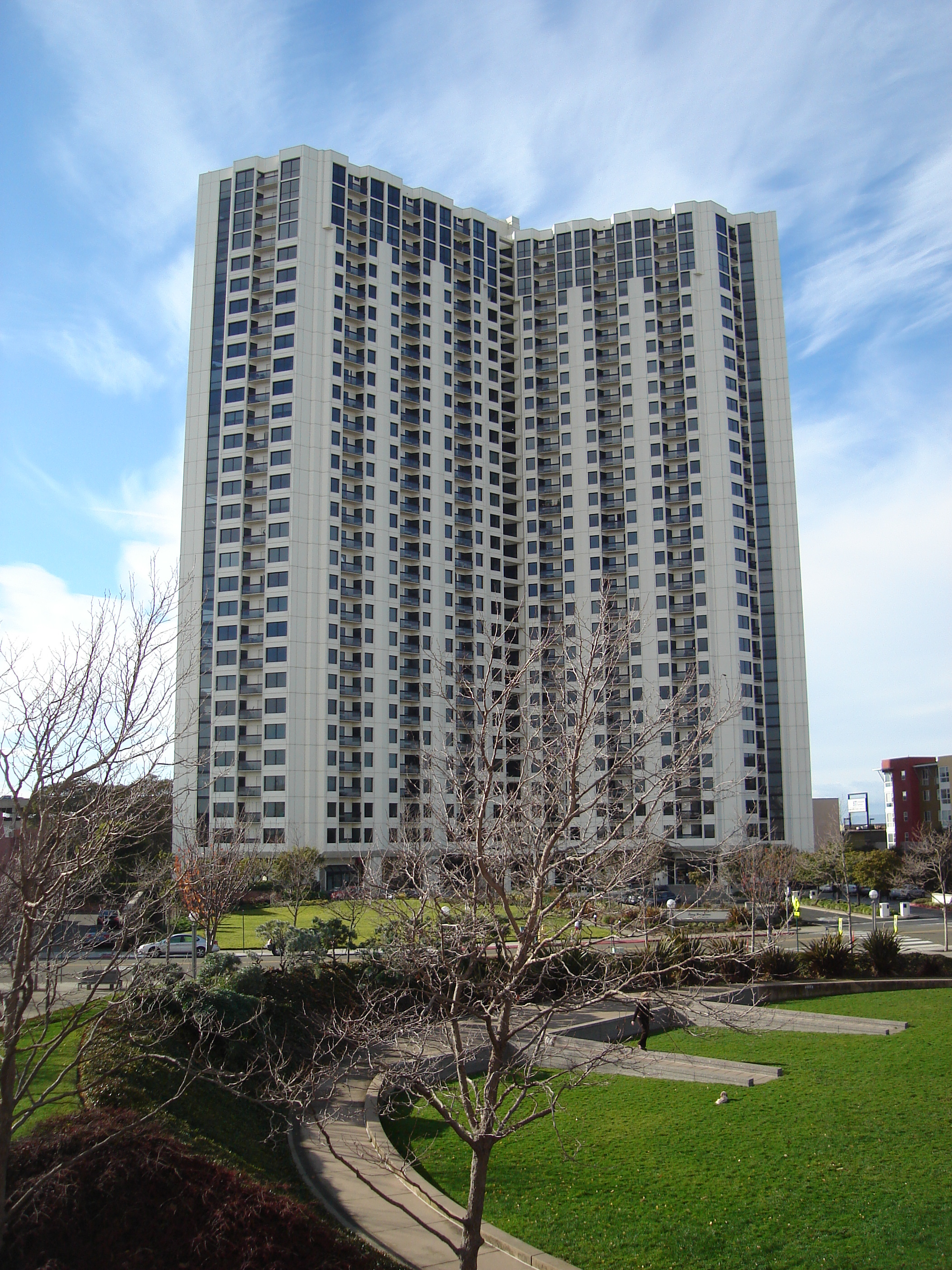
- Interactive map of the Pacific Park Plaza area

General information
- Status: Completed
- Type: Residential
- Location: 6363 Christie Avenue; Emeryville, California
- Coordinates: 37°50′31″N 122°17′47″W
- Opening: 1984

Height
- Roof: 318 ft (97 m)

Technical details
- Floor count: 30

Pacific Park Plaza is a 30-story residential building located in Emeryville, California adjacent to Interstate 80. Standing at 318 ft (97 m) tall, Pacific Park Plaza is the tallest building in Emeryville, and the tallest in the San Francisco Bay Area outside of San Francisco and Oakland.

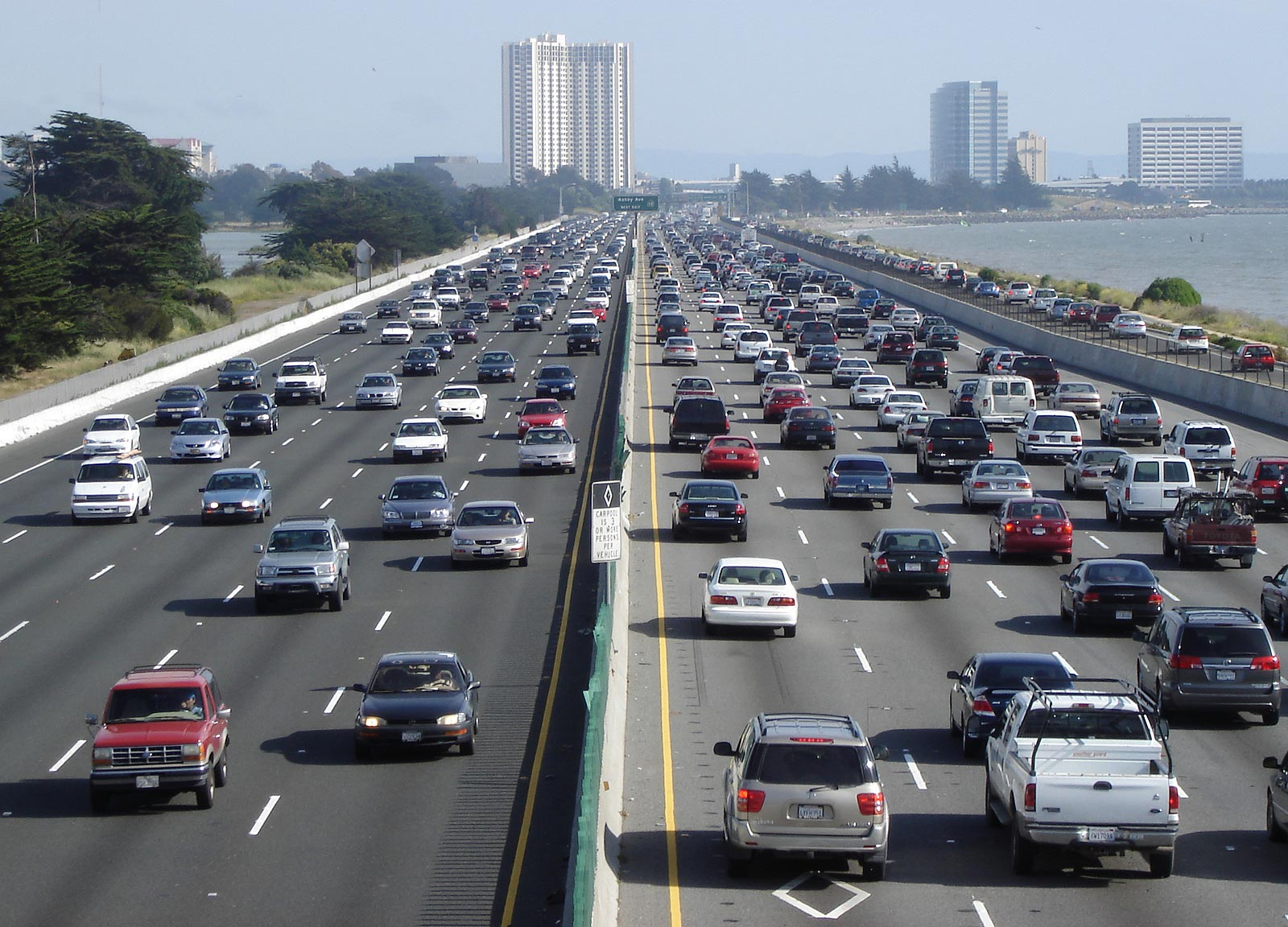
Eastshore Freeway in Berkeley, view south towards Pacific Park Plaza in Emeryville

Pacific Park Plaza was completed in 1984. Its response to the 1989 Loma Prieta earthquake has been extensively studied due to its instrumentation.

The building's 580 apartments are a mix of one-bedroom and two-bedroom apartments. Residents and homeowners can join the Pacific Park Plaza Homeowners Association. Residents have included Dave Stewart of the Oakland Athletics.
