= Richmond Parkway (California) =

Road in Richmond, California, United States of America

- Richmond Parkway highlighted in red
- Maintained by: CCTA, City of Richmond DPW, C.C. Co. PWD
- Length: 7 mi (11 km)
- Location: Richmond, California
- South end: I-580 in Point Richmond
- North end: I-80 and Fitzgerald Drive at city limits of Richmond and Pinole

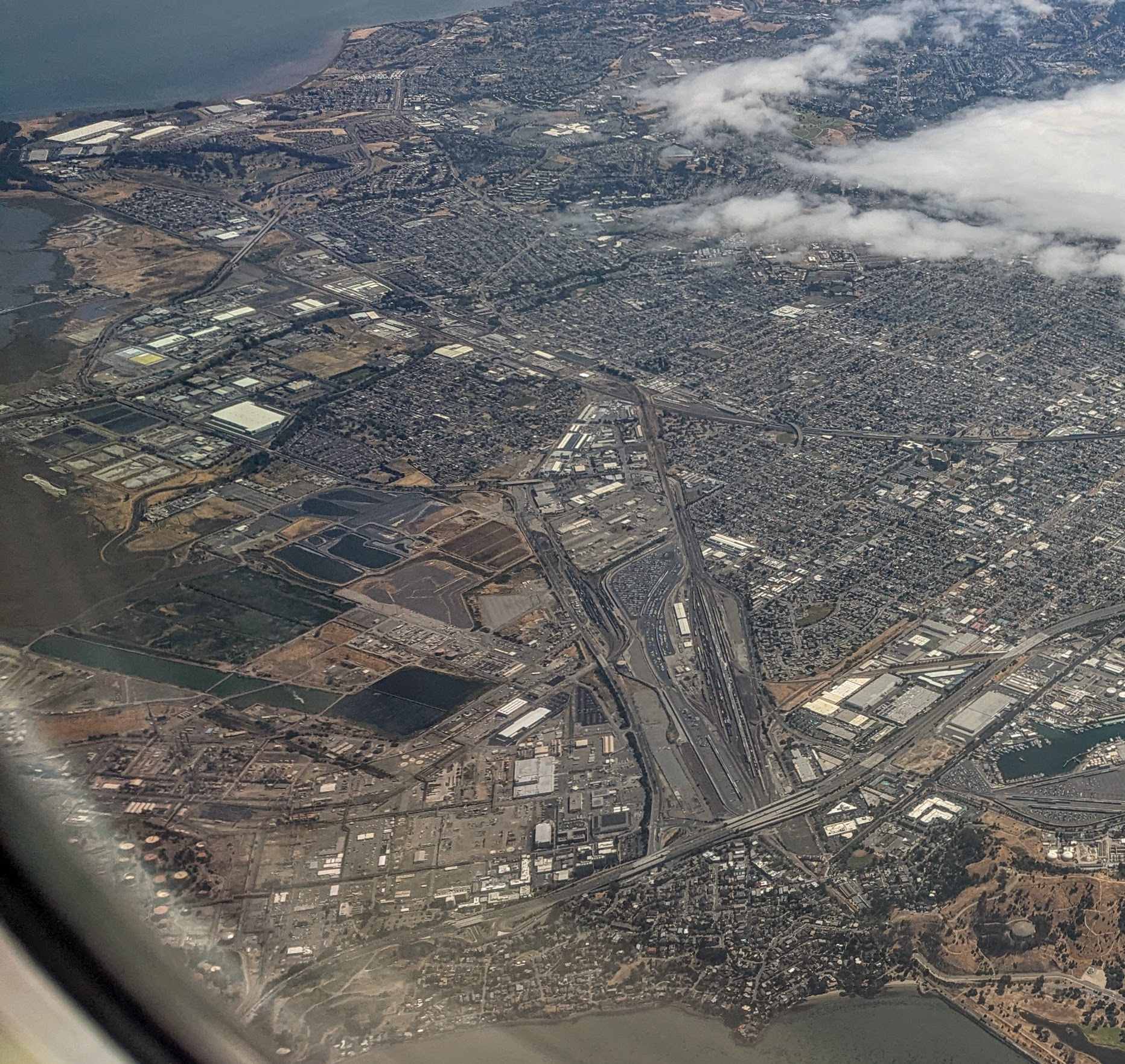
The entire route of the Richmond Parkway is visible in this aerial view, from the south or west terminus at Point Richmond near the Santa Fe Channel and yacht harbor (lower right) to the north or east terminus at I-80 (top center, above the left tip of the upper cloud).

Richmond Parkway (originally Richmond Bypass) is an arterial road connecting Interstate 580 and Interstate 80 through Richmond, California. The road allows drivers traveling between Marin County (to the west) and Solano County (to the north) to bypass central Richmond.

== History ==
Richmond Parkway follows the routing of the proposed California State Route 93

The original idea for Richmond Parkway came from a state proposal for State Route 93 in the early 1980s. As defined in Section 393 of the California Streets and Highways Code, the proposed State Route 93 connects the proposed State Route 77 extension near Moraga with State Route 24 in Orinda, Interstate 80 at the Pinole–Richmond line, and Interstate 580 in Richmond. The traversable route includes Moraga Way, Camino Pablo, and San Pablo Dam Road. When the state did not implement the plan, local officials assembled $200 million in state and local funds to fund a road largely following the same route as proposed Route 93, which was built in the 1990s.

While it mostly functions as an expressway, parts of Richmond Parkway do not meet state expressway standards, deeming it ineligible for adoption as a state highway under Section 81 of the Streets and Highways Code until local officials bring it up to the state's standards.

== Major intersections ==
The entire route is in Contra Costa County.

| Location | mi | km | Destinations | Notes |
|---|---|---|---|---|
| Richmond | 0.0 | 0.0 | I-580 (John T. Knox Freeway) – San Rafael, Oakland | West end of arterial; I-580 exit 7B |
| Richmond | 1.6 | 2.6 | Castro Street | Richmond Parkway joins/splits two existing routes: Castro Street and Garrard Boulevard; traffic southbound defaults onto Garrard Boulevard; interchange |
| Richmond | 4.6 | 7.4 | Giant Highway | Interchange |
| Richmond | 5.8 | 9.3 | San Pablo Avenue | Former US 40 |
| Richmond–Pinole line | 7.0 | 11.3 | I-80 (Eastshore Freeway) – San Francisco, Sacramento | East end of arterial; I-80 exit 20 |
| Richmond–Pinole line | 7.0 | 11.3 | Fitzgerald Drive | Continuation beyond I-80 |
1.000 mi = 1.609 km; 1.000 km = 0.621 mi
