= California State Route 65 =

Highway in California

State Route 65
- SR 65 highlighted in red.

Route information
- Maintained by Caltrans
- Length: 94.217 mi (151.628 km) SR 65 is broken into pieces due to an unconstructed portion, and the length does not reflect the gap.

Section 1
- Length: 64.75 mi (104.21 km)
- South end: SR 99 near Bakersfield
- Major intersections: SR 155 near Delano; SR 190 in Porterville; SR 137 near Lindsay
- North end: SR 198 near Exeter

Section 2
- Length: 29.467 mi (47.423 km)
- South end: I-80 in Roseville
- North end: SR 70 in Olivehurst

Location
- Country: United States
- State: California
- Counties: Kern, Tulare, Placer, Yuba

Highway system
- State highways in California; Interstate; US; State; Scenic; History; Pre‑1964; Unconstructed; Deleted; Freeways
← SR 64	→ US 66

State Route 65 (SR 65) is a north-south state highway in the U.S. state of California that consists of two non-contiguous segments in the Central Valley. The route, originally known as the Eastside Freeway, was envisioned as a major freeway following the east side of the valley near the foothills of the Sierra Nevada, similar to the Westside Freeway (Interstate 5) on the opposite side of the valley. Of the estimated 300 miles (480 km), only 95 miles (153 km) were constructed due to funding issues, environmental concerns, and low population growth.

The southern segment begins at SR 99, near Bakersfield and terminates at SR 198 near Exeter. It also serves the communities of Oildale, Ducor, Terra Bella, Porterville, Strathmore, and Lindsay. The northern segment begins at Interstate 80 in Roseville and terminates at SR 70 at Olivehurst. It also serves the communities of Rocklin, Lincoln, and Wheatland. If built, the center segment would serve the communities of Ivanhoe, Reedley, Sanger, Waterford, and Oakdale.

== Route description ==
Route 65 is defined as follows in section 365 of the California Streets and Highways Code, broken into the constructed and the proposed segments:

Route 65 is from:
(a) Route 99 near Bakersfield to Route 198 near Exeter.
(b) Route 198 near Exeter to Route 80 near Roseville on a route along the easterly side of the San Joaquin Valley, which route may include all or portions of any existing state highway route.
(c) Route 80 near Roseville to Route 70 near Marysville.
(d) Route 70 near Marysville to Route 99 in or near Yuba City.

SR 65 is part of the California Freeway and Expressway System; the southern segment as well as the northern segment in Roseville and near Yuba City are part of the National Highway System, a network of highways that are considered essential to the country's economy, defense, and mobility by the Federal Highway Administration.

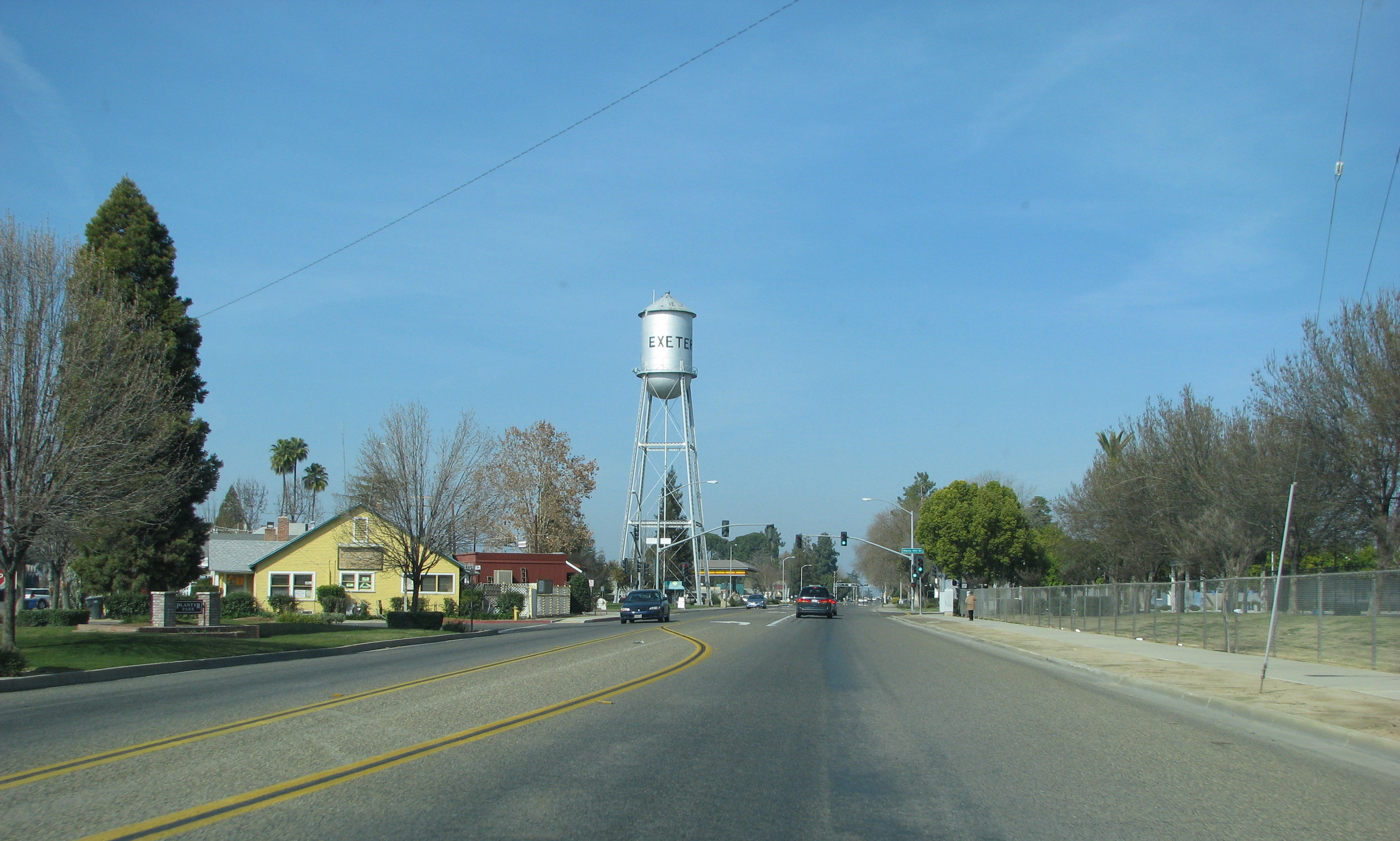
California State Route 65 near Exeter.

=== South segment ===
The southern segment of State Route 65 begins at a partial interchange with State Route 99 north of Bakersfield. From here to Porterville is a mostly 40-mile (64 km) rural two-lane highway through hills and grasslands while passing through the communities of Ducor and Terra Bella. This stretch of roadway is often considered very dangerous given the heavy amount of semi-trucks that drive this corridor. SR 65 expands to a four-lane freeway through Porterville, downgrading into a four-lane expressway upon leaving the city. The highway remains an expressway, passing Strathmore and up to Lindsay. The highway is then reduced to a rural two-lane highway through agricultural areas while passing through Exeter. SR 65's southern segment ends at the junction of State Route 198. This section has been designated the All America City Highway.

=== North segment ===
The northern segment of State Route 65 begins at the interchange with Interstate 80 in Roseville as a freeway heading northwest to Blue Oaks Boulevard where the freeway turns north towards Lincoln. It turns northwest briefly onto a bypass of Lincoln at Industrial Avenue/Lincoln Boulevard (the state route's former alignment) where it then turns west as the freeway ends at Nelson Lane. The highway is then downgraded to a four-lane expressway, turning north again, downgraded further to a two-lane highway, until it meets up with its original alignment just north of the community of Sheridan. After passing through Wheatland, it assumes its freeway designation a few miles north of the town, ending at State Route 70 in Olivehurst.

In 2000, Caltrans issued a Project Study Report (PSR) that analyzed six alternative alignments for the proposed Wheatland Bypass. After extensive public meetings, Caltrans identified Alternative E as the preferred alternative. Alternative E would start at the northern end of the Lincoln Bypass, and proceed due north, crossing the Bear River on a new bridge to the east of the existing SR 65 alignment. It would bypass Wheatland to the east, and then turn west and pass along the southern edge of Beale Air Force Base before connecting to south end of the freeway segment at South Beale Road. If completed, the Wheatland Bypass would enable continuous freeway travel from I-80 to Marysville (via SR 70). Although Caltrans completed the PSR in 2000 that identified the preferred alignment, the Wheatland Bypass remains unfunded. State and local officials cannot present a timetable for completing the bypass until $300 million is secured to complete the required environmental studies and construction.

North of its present northern terminus at SR 70 in Olivehurst, the legislative designation of SR 65 continues west/northwest to SR 99 in (or south of) Yuba City. Caltrans has planned since 1986 to extend SR 65 as a freeway west or northwest from SR 70 to SR 99 via a third bridge across the Feather River south of Yuba City to alleviate traffic on the two existing bridges between Yuba City and Marysville. Funding issues and environmental concerns have stalled the extension of SR 65 to Yuba City and the third Feather River Bridge.

== History ==
=== Bakersfield to Roseville ===
The initial segment was created in 1933 as Legislative Route 129. It was defined from LRN 4 (formerly US 99 and currently SR 99) near Bakersfield to LRN 263 (currently SR 180) in Kings Canyon National Park. The entire route was signed Route 65.

In the 1950s, California was developing plans for a statewide freeway network. Within the San Joaquin Valley, routes were discussed on the west side and along U.S. Route 99 (Golden State Highway). However, officials in Stanislaus County believed that an additional major north-south freeway was needed to serve the east side of the valley. In 1955, they formally proposed the Eastside Freeway, which would be the eastern companion to the Westside Freeway. In 1959, the state defined Legislative Route 249, which would run from the junction of LRN 10 (currently SR 198) and LRN 129 to LRN 17 (currently I-80). This would mark the birth of the Eastside Freeway.

In 1964, California's state highways were renumbered. The portion of LRN 129 between Exeter and SR 180 would be removed and become SR 245. The remainder of LRN 129, all of LRN 249, and U.S. Route 99E (section north of Roseville), would be combined to create SR 65. By 1969, except for Merced County, all eight counties which the route would traverse had it included in their general plans. This created a continuous roadway plan from Bakersfield to Roseville.

The first segment to be constructed as a freeway was in 1964. A short freeway segment (about 0.5 miles (0.80 km)) was built at SR 99 in Kern County in conjunction with a portion of the freeway upgrade to the Golden State Freeway (SR 99). However, development of the rest of the corridor was difficult. The California Highway Commission put a greater emphasis on the construction of the Westside Freeway, which would be included in the Interstate Highway System. In addition, efforts were underway for the upgrade of the Golden State Freeway through the center of the valley. As a result, the Eastside Freeway was given a much lower priority.

Most of the construction efforts for the freeway were conducted in Tulare County. In 1970, the segment through the City of Porterville was constructed as a freeway. The two-lane highway between the Tulare County line and SR 198 was converted to a two-lane expressway with land reserved for future interchanges (or interchange footprint). In Sacramento County, land was reserved south of Roseville, and a freeway-to-freeway interchange was constructed at US 50 and Sunrise Boulevard.

By the mid 1970s, California began to abandon some of its freeway projects, which included the Eastside Freeway. The land reserved in Sacramento County was sold and the freeway-to-freeway interchange was converted to a local interchange. The project was considered dead. None of the original LRN 249 segment (between Roseville and Exeter) was constructed.

=== Roseville to Yuba City ===
The northern section originally was US 99E, running from Marysville to Roseville, and was converted to SR 65 during the state highway renumbering effort in 1964. A freeway section (named the Harold T. "Bizz" Johnson Expressway) bypassing downtown Roseville was completed later, with the original downtown Roseville section of SR 65 (former US 99E) released from the state highway system. In the 1950s, a right-of-way was reserved for a SR 65 freeway running from Roseville through Citrus Heights and Fair Oaks to Rancho Cordova, but plans for this freeway were abandoned in the 1970s and the right-of-way has been relinquished to private owners. The portion of Sunrise Boulevard south of US 50 was added to the SR 65 routing during the 1970s, but has since been relinquished back to Sacramento County.

In 2008, construction began on a 12.48 miles (20.08 km) bypass around Lincoln to alleviate traffic congestion in and around the city. The first phase of the bypass is a four-lane freeway from Industrial Avenue/Lincoln Boulevard to Nelson Lane and a two-lane expressway from Nelson Lane to Riosa Road in Sheridan, reconnecting with the original alignment of SR 65 north of town. There is a partial interchange at Industrial Avenue/Lincoln Boulevard, a full interchange at Ferrari Ranch Road and at-grade intersections at Nelson Lane, West Wise Road and Riosa Road. The bypass was completed on October 5, 2012 with a ribbon-cutting ceremony, opening to traffic two days later. A second phase of the Lincoln bypass was completed in June 2014; it expanded to four lanes between Nelson Lane and West Wise Road, with two lanes in each direction.

The interchange at Sunset Boulevard was opened to traffic in March 2010, eliminating the last traffic signal between I-80 and the city of Lincoln. It effectively also upgraded SR 65 from expressway to freeway status from the Sunset Boulevard interchange to just north of the Twelve Bridges Drive interchange (then later to Nelson Lane in 2012 when the Lincoln bypass opened).

== Future ==
With the projected growth of the Central Valley, interest has reemerged in constructing all or part of the unconstructed portion of SR 65. A multi-county committee has been formed to discuss the transportation needs of the Eastern Central Valley, including the construction of SR 65 over twenty years. The committee will look at what route the road will take, what type of road would be built (highway, expressway, or freeway), and what the road would eventually become (also known as the ultimate transportation corridor or UTC).

In order to alleviate traffic congestion between the northern parts of SR 65 and I-80 and downtown Sacramento, the Placer Parkway project, a bypass from SR 65 at the current Whitney Ranch Parkway interchange to SR 99 to the west, has been initiated, but its expected completion date is unknown.

Another study is looking at extending SR 65 north to a future eastern extension of SR 152. Currently, five cities exist in the eastern Central Valley with population between 15,000 and 20,000 (as of the 2000 census) that do not have access to a north/south state highway. This project would create a state highway that would connect these cities together and to SR 99. This connection would be north of Madera, providing a bypass to Visalia and Fresno. It would also provide an alternative route for travelers in Southern California and the South Central Valley, to access mountain vacation spots in areas east of Fresno.

In the southern section, plans are underway to convert all of the two-lane highway portions to a four-lane expressway. In addition, the short segment to Exeter would be moved to allow for a continuous roadway. Originally, the widening project was going to be a joint effort between Kern and Tulare counties, but priority changes in Kern County have delayed its portion to a future date.

In the northern section, a third phase of the Lincoln bypass at a future date will expand the highway to four lanes between West Wise Road and Riosa Road and upgrading the at-grade intersections to interchanges. The project is currently unfunded. In the future, SR 65 eventually will become a continuous four-lane freeway from I-80 in Roseville to Riosa Road in Sheridan.

== Major intersections ==
Except where prefixed with a letter, postmiles were measured on the road as it was in 1964, based on the alignment that existed at the time, and do not necessarily reflect current mileage. Postmile prefixes include: R reflecting a realignment in the route since then, M indicating a second realignment, L referring to an overlap due to a correction or change, and T indicating postmiles classified as temporary. Segments that remain unconstructed or have been relinquished to local control may be omitted. The numbers reset at county lines; the start and end postmiles in each county are given in the county column.

County	Location	Postmile	Exit	Destinations	Notes
Kern; KER R0.00-25.17		R0.00		SR 99 south – Bakersfield	No access to SR 99 north; south end of SR 65; former US 99 / US 466; SR 99 north exit 30
Kern; KER R0.00-25.17			North end of freeway		
Kern; KER R0.00-25.17				Merle Haggard Drive, 7th Standard Road to SR 99 north	Serves Meadows Field Airport
Kern; KER R0.00-25.17		23.19		SR 155 (Garces Highway) – Glennville, Delano	
Tulare; TUL 0.00-39.58	Ducor	R6.98		Avenue 56 (CR J22) – Ducor, California Hot Springs, Earlimart	
Tulare; TUL 0.00-39.58	Terra Bella	R11.86		Avenue 95 (CR J24) – Terra Bella, Pixley	
Tulare; TUL 0.00-39.58	Porterville		South end of freeway		
Tulare; TUL 0.00-39.58	Porterville	18.16	43	SR 190 – Tipton, Springville	
Tulare; TUL 0.00-39.58	Porterville	19.14	44	Olive Avenue (CR J26)	Serves Sierra View Medical Center
Tulare; TUL 0.00-39.58	Porterville	R20.14	45	Henderson Avenue	
Tulare; TUL 0.00-39.58	Porterville		North end of freeway		
Tulare; TUL 0.00-39.58	Porterville			Pioneer Avenue	No access across SR 65
Tulare; TUL 0.00-39.58				Avenue 196 (CR J28) – Strathmore	
Tulare; TUL 0.00-39.58	Lindsay	29.49		Hermosa Street (CR J29) – Lindsay	
Tulare; TUL 0.00-39.58		31.55		SR 137 west (Avenue 232) / Road 196 (CR J27 south) – Tulare	South end of CR J27 overlap
Tulare; TUL 0.00-39.58	Exeter	37.10		Firebaugh Avenue (CR J30)	
Tulare; TUL 0.00-39.58		39.58		SR 198 / Road 196 (CR J27 north) – Sequoia Park, Visalia	North end of CR J27 overlap; north end of southern section of SR 65
Gap in route
Placer; PLA R4.86-R24.26	Roseville	R4.86	306	I-80 – Reno, Sacramento	Southbound exit and northbound entrance; south end of northern section of SR 65; signed as exits 306A (east) and 306B (west); I-80 exit 106
Placer; PLA R4.86-R24.26	Roseville	R5.93	307	Galleria Boulevard, Stanford Ranch Road	
Placer; PLA R4.86-R24.26	Roseville	R7.10	308	Pleasant Grove Boulevard	
Placer; PLA R4.86-R24.26	Roseville–Rocklin line	M8.07	309	Blue Oaks Boulevard, Washington Boulevard	Washington Boulevard is former SR 65 south
Placer; PLA R4.86-R24.26	Rocklin	R9.57	311	Sunset Boulevard	
Placer; PLA R4.86-R24.26	Rocklin	R10.57	312	Whitney Ranch Parkway	No southbound exit; future connection to Placer Parkway
Placer; PLA R4.86-R24.26	Lincoln	R11.92	313	Twelve Bridges Drive	
Placer; PLA R4.86-R24.26	Lincoln	R12.86	314	Lincoln Boulevard	Northbound exit and southbound entrance; south end of Lincoln bypass; former US 99E / SR 65 north
Placer; PLA R4.86-R24.26	Lincoln	R13.38	315	Ferrari Ranch Road	
Placer; PLA R4.86-R24.26			North end of freeway		
Placer; PLA R4.86-R24.26		R15.50		Nelson Lane	At-grade intersection; proposed interchange
Placer; PLA R4.86-R24.26		R19.46		West Wise Road	At-grade intersection; proposed interchange
Placer; PLA R4.86-R24.26		L23.19		Riosa Road – Sheridan	At-grade intersection; proposed interchange; north end of Lincoln bypass; connects to former US 99E / SR 65 south
Yuba; YUB R0.00-R9.18			South end of freeway		
Yuba; YUB R0.00-R9.18		R6.88	332	Forty Mile Road, Ostrom Road	Serves Toyota Amphitheatre
Yuba; YUB R0.00-R9.18	Olivehurst	R8.03	333	McGowan Parkway	
Yuba; YUB R0.00-R9.18	Olivehurst	R9.18		SR 70 north – Marysville	No access to SR 70 south; north end of SR 65; SR 70 south exit 17
1.000 mi = 1.609 km; 1.000 km = 0.621 mi: Concurrency terminus; Incomplete access
