= Crystal Springs, California =

Crystal Springs, California may refer to:

- The former name of Sanitarium, California in Napa County, California
- The former village of Crystal Springs in San Mateo County, California
- Crystal Springs Reservoir in San Mateo County, California
- Crystal Springs Dam, which delineates the Crystal Springs Reservoir
