= Alta, California =

Unincorporated community in California, United States

- Census-designated place
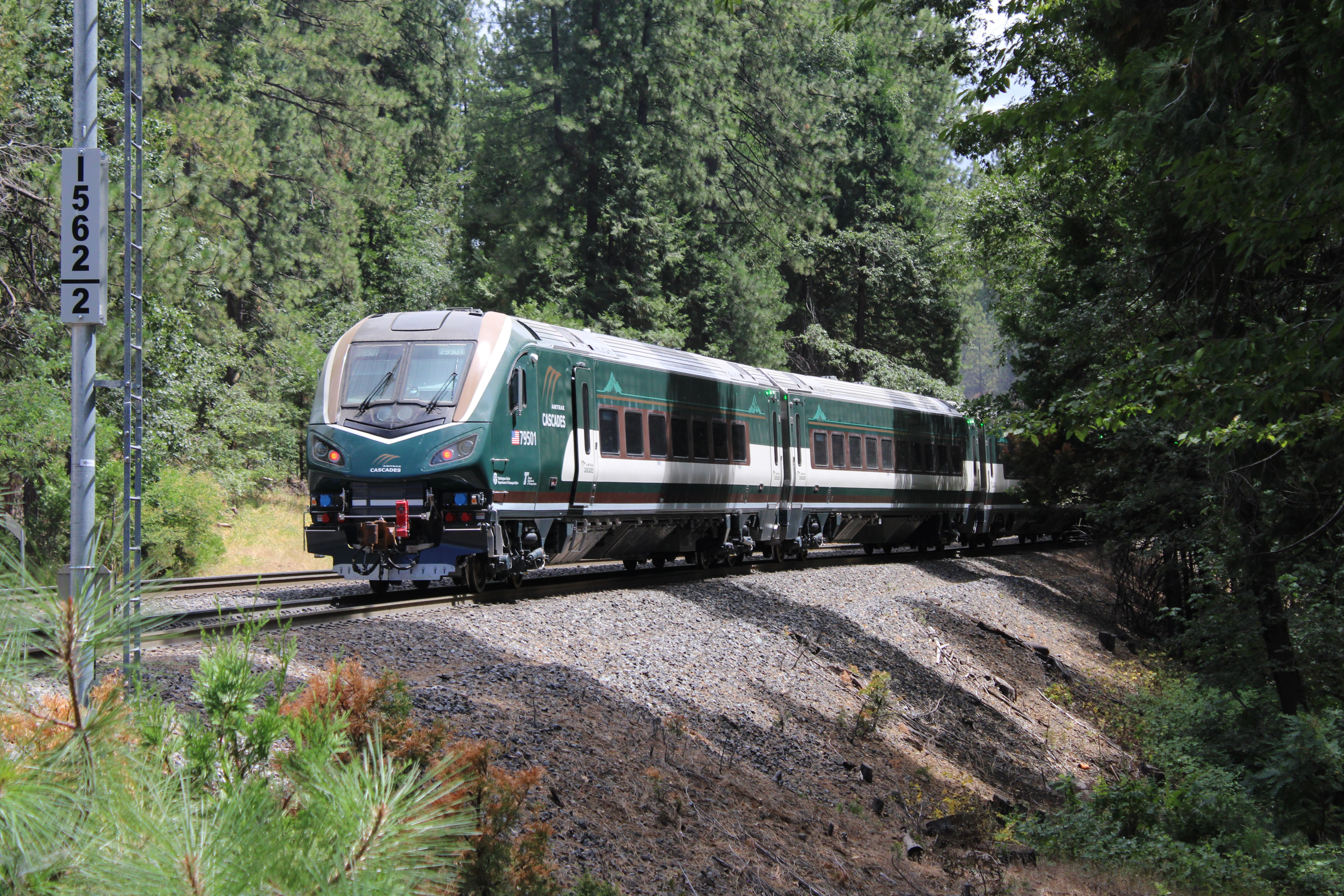
- An Amtrak train passing through Alta in 2025

- Location with the United States
- Coordinates: 39°12′24″N 120°48′41″W
- Country: United States
- State: California
- County: Placer

Area
  - Total: 2.39 sq mi (6.19 km^{2})
  - Land: 2.38 sq mi (6.17 km^{2})
  - Water: 0.0077 sq mi (0.02 km^{2}) 0.28%
- Elevation: 3,730 ft (1,140 m)

Population (2020)
  - Total: 615
  - Density: 258.0/sq mi (99.62/km^{2})
- Time zone: UTC-8 (Pacific (PST))
  - Summer (DST): UTC-7 (PDT)
- ZIP Code: 95701
- Area code: 530, 837
- FIPS code: 06-01276
- GNIS feature ID: 2628704

Alta (Spanish for "Upper") is a small unincorporated community and census-designated place (CDP) in Placer County, California, United States, about 30 miles (48 km) northeast of Auburn. The village is located off Interstate 80 and along the historical First transcontinental railroad. The ZIP code is 95701 and the area code 530. One of the few buildings other than private residences is the Alta-Dutch Flat Grammar School serving kindergarten through eighth grade students. The high school that serves Alta is named Colfax High School. Colfax High School is 11 miles southwest in the incorporated town of Colfax. The population of Alta was 615 at the 2020 census.

A historical California place once named Alta was located in San Diego County near the present-day La Mesa–El Cajon boundary. This historical place was along the San Diego and Arizona Eastern Railway, now the San Diego Trolley Orange Line, at its Murray Drive undercrossing in La Mesa. The community was named after the Spanish word meaning "upper" or "high".

== Geography ==
According to the United States Census Bureau, the CDP covers an area of 2.4 square miles (6.2 km^{2}), 99.72% of it land, and 0.28% of it water.

=== Climate ===
Blue Canyon–Nyack Airport has a warm-summer Mediterranean climate (Csb) according to the Köppen climate classification system. Summers are generally warm with cool nights, while winters are moderately cold and extremely snowy, despite no month having an average low temperature below freezing.

Climate data for Blue Canyon, California (Blue Canyon–Nyack Airport), 1991–2020 normals, extremes 1943–present
Month	Jan	Feb	Mar	Apr	May	Jun	Jul	Aug	Sep	Oct	Nov	Dec	Year
Record high °F (°C)	76 (24)	73 (23)	72 (22)	82 (28)	88 (31)	92 (33)	95 (35)	97 (36)	96 (36)	88 (31)	78 (26)	75 (24)	97 (36)
Mean maximum °F (°C)	63.1 (17.3)	60.7 (15.9)	63.1 (17.3)	71.4 (21.9)	76.3 (24.6)	85.2 (29.6)	87.3 (30.7)	86.6 (30.3)	85.3 (29.6)	76.5 (24.7)	69.5 (20.8)	61.1 (16.2)	89.5 (31.9)
Mean daily maximum °F (°C)	46.5 (8.1)	45.0 (7.2)	48.2 (9.0)	52.0 (11.1)	60.6 (15.9)	69.8 (21.0)	77.8 (25.4)	77.4 (25.2)	72.9 (22.7)	62.9 (17.2)	51.2 (10.7)	44.8 (7.1)	59.1 (15.1)
Daily mean °F (°C)	40.4 (4.7)	39.0 (3.9)	41.5 (5.3)	44.8 (7.1)	53.1 (11.7)	62.1 (16.7)	70.2 (21.2)	69.8 (21.0)	65.1 (18.4)	55.5 (13.1)	45.1 (7.3)	39.2 (4.0)	52.2 (11.2)
Mean daily minimum °F (°C)	34.4 (1.3)	33.1 (0.6)	34.7 (1.5)	37.5 (3.1)	45.6 (7.6)	54.4 (12.4)	62.7 (17.1)	62.1 (16.7)	57.2 (14.0)	48.1 (8.9)	39.0 (3.9)	33.6 (0.9)	45.2 (7.3)
Mean minimum °F (°C)	21.6 (−5.8)	19.9 (−6.7)	23.0 (−5.0)	24.9 (−3.9)	31.6 (−0.2)	38.5 (3.6)	53.9 (12.2)	52.9 (11.6)	41.2 (5.1)	33.0 (0.6)	25.8 (−3.4)	20.3 (−6.5)	16.5 (−8.6)
Record low °F (°C)	5 (−15)	6 (−14)	9 (−13)	17 (−8)	21 (−6)	28 (−2)	36 (2)	35 (2)	27 (−3)	17 (−8)	13 (−11)	3 (−16)	3 (−16)
Average precipitation inches (mm)	9.87 (251)	10.56 (268)	9.40 (239)	4.76 (121)	3.71 (94)	1.20 (30)	0.09 (2.3)	0.28 (7.1)	1.03 (26)	3.87 (98)	8.39 (213)	11.46 (291)	64.62 (1,640.4)
Average snowfall inches (cm)	48.1 (122)	43.5 (110)	49.8 (126)	25.0 (64)	7.5 (19)	0.6 (1.5)	0.0 (0.0)	0.0 (0.0)	0.4 (1.0)	2.7 (6.9)	24.0 (61)	38.8 (99)	240.3 (610)
Average precipitation days (≥ 0.01 in)	11.5	11.8	11.6	10.5	6.0	2.6	0.6	1.1	2.8	6.1	10.5	14.4	89.5
Source 1: NOAA (mean maxima and minima 2006–2020)
Source 2: WRCC (snowfall 1940–2012)

== Demographics ==
Historical population
Census	Pop.	Note	%±
2010	610		—
2020	615		0.8%
U.S. Decennial Census; 1860–1870 1880-1890; 1900 1910 1920; 1930 1940 1950; 1960 1970 1980; 1990 2000 2010

Alta first appeared as a census designated place in the 2010 U.S. census.

=== 2020 census ===
As of the 2020 census, Alta had a population of 615. The population density was 258.0 inhabitants per square mile (99.6/km^{2}). The median age was 50.2 years. The age distribution was 19.2% under the age of 18, 4.9% aged 18 to 24, 22.0% aged 25 to 44, 28.8% aged 45 to 64, and 25.2% who were 65 years of age or older. For every 100 females there were 108.5 males, and for every 100 females age 18 and over there were 110.6 males age 18 and over.

0.0% of residents lived in urban areas, while 100.0% lived in rural areas.

The whole population lived in households. There were 248 households, of which 22.2% had children under the age of 18 living in them. Of all households, 54.8% were married-couple households, 3.6% were cohabiting couple households, 31.9% were households with a male householder and no spouse or partner present, and 9.7% were households with a female householder and no spouse or partner present. About 27.0% of all households were made up of individuals and 14.9% had someone living alone who was 65 years of age or older. The average household size was 2.48. There were 164 families (66.1% of all households).

There were 308 housing units at an average density of 129.2 units per square mile (49.9 units/km^{2}), of which 19.5% were vacant. Of the occupied units, 77.0% were owner-occupied and 23.0% were renter-occupied. The homeowner vacancy rate was 1.0% and the rental vacancy rate was 0.0%.

Racial composition as of the 2020 census
Race	Number	Percent
White	534	86.8%
Black or African American	1	0.2%
American Indian and Alaska Native	17	2.8%
Asian	5	0.8%
Native Hawaiian and Other Pacific Islander	0	0.0%
Some other race	7	1.1%
Two or more races	51	8.3%
Hispanic or Latino (of any race)	39	6.3%
