= Blue Canyon–Nyack Airport =

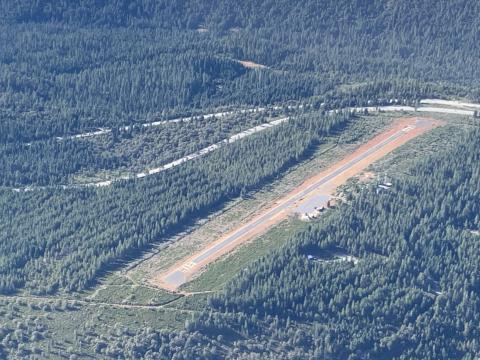
- IATA: BLU; ICAO: KBLU; FAA LID: BLU

Summary
- Airport type: public
- Location: Emigrant Gap, California
- Elevation AMSL: 5,284 ft (1,611 m)
- Coordinates: 39°16′30″N 120°42′35″W

Map
- Location within California

Runways
Direction	Length		Surface
Direction	ft	m	Surface
15/33	3,300	1,006	Asphalt

Blue Canyon–Nyack Airport (IATA: BLU, ICAO: KBLU, FAA LID: BLU) is an airport in Emigrant Gap, Placer County, California and is located on United States Forest Service land.

The airport is served by a single asphalt runway, 15/33, the dimensions of which are 3,300 by 50 feet (1,006 by 15 meters). The runway is closed and unlit from sunset to sunrise. The airport is situated at an elevation of 5,284 feet (1,611 meters) above sea level in the Sierra Nevada mountain range. The airport is surrounded by trees and is closed during the winter because there are no de-icing or snow removal facilities at the airport. It began operations in May 1941 and is publicly owned.

There is normally a chemical toilet on site between spring and winter. In 2026, it was removed on November 9th as the snow started on November 13th.

During major fires or high-risk fire conditions, the airport tarmac is used as a Heli-1 wildfire suppression helibase for emergency response teams such as Tahoe and Plumas helitack. Aegis deployable air traffic control is used.

The airport is physically in Blue Canyon, officially registered under Emigrant Gap, and shares a zip code with Alta.

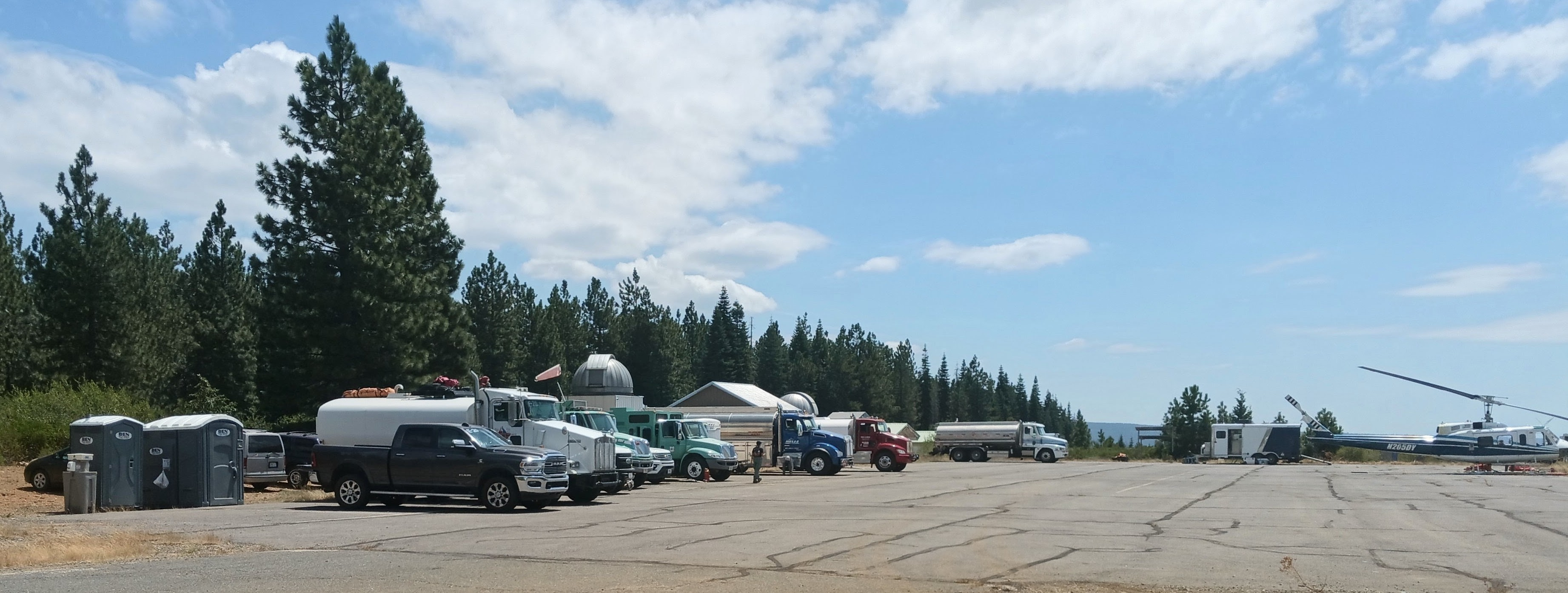
Blue Canyon Airport being used as a Helibase to fight the Talbot fire on 14 August 2026. Tahoe Helitack on the right.
