= Cisco Grove, California =

Unincorporated community in California, United States

Cisco Grove
- Unincorporated community
- Location in California Cisco Grove (the United States)
- Coordinates: 39°18′36″N 120°32′24″W
- Country: United States
- State: California
- County: Placer County
- Elevation: 5,640 ft (1,720 m)

Cisco Grove is an unincorporated community in Placer County, California. Cisco Grove is located 7 miles (11.3 km) east of Emigrant Gap. It lies at an elevation of 5643 feet (1720 m).
