= Blue Canyon, California =

Unincorporated community in California, United States

Blue Canyon
- Unincorporated community
- Location in California Blue Canyon (the United States)
- Coordinates: 39°15′26″N 120°42′40″W
- Country: United States
- State: California
- County: Placer County
- Elevation: 4,695 ft (1,431 m)

Blue Canyon (also, Blue Cañon) is an unincorporated community in Placer County, California. Blue Canyon is located 4 miles (6.4 km) southwest of Emigrant Gap. It lies at an elevation of 4695 feet (1431 m).

Blue Canyon was possibly named for the blue smoke of the camps when extensive lumbering occurred there in the 1850s. It might otherwise have been named after a miner from that same period named "Old Jim Blue".

The Blue Canyon post office operated from 1867 to 1927. The Blue Cañon post office operated from 1936 to 1942 and from 1948 to 1964.

== History ==
Following the California Gold Rush of 1849, a miner named Jim Blue prospected for gold in the Canyon and established a small mining camp.

In 1859, the Towle Brothers built and operated a lumber mill in Blue Canyon. In 1866, tracks from the first Transcontinental railroad reached Blue Canyon from Sacramento, followed by daily scheduled train service. The post office was established the following year. Railroad support services were established including a train station, hotel, worker housing, lunch counter, cookhouse, turntable, water and fueling facilities.

By the 1870s, water from a natural spring in Blue Canyon was being shipped to hotels in Sacramento. A fire train was permanently assigned and kept under constant steam.

In 1882, the population was 162. There were two hotels and a one-room school with 22 students in attendance.

In 1907, Blue Canyon became a railroad crew change location resulting in a population increase as train crews were assigned there.

During prohibition, Blue Canyon became a location for bootleggers, resulting in increased tourism.

In 1926, double tracking of the railroad was completed, eliminating Blue Canyon as a crew change location. The population decreased significantly as workers were transferred.

By 1936, the last active mine in the area had closed.

In the 1950s, diesel locomotives replaced steam engines. In 1964, railroad support services were shut down as they were no longer needed. The population decreased to a near ghost town and the post office closed permanently.

== Climate ==
Blue Canyon has a warm-summer Mediterranean climate (Csb) according to the Köppen climate classification system. Summers are generally warm with cool nights, while winters are moderately cold and extremely snowy, despite no month having an average low temperature below freezing.

Climate data for Blue Canyon, California (Blue Canyon–Nyack Airport), 1991–2020 normals, extremes 1943–present
Month	Jan	Feb	Mar	Apr	May	Jun	Jul	Aug	Sep	Oct	Nov	Dec	Year
Record high °F (°C)	76 (24)	73 (23)	72 (22)	82 (28)	88 (31)	92 (33)	95 (35)	97 (36)	96 (36)	88 (31)	78 (26)	75 (24)	97 (36)
Mean maximum °F (°C)	63.1 (17.3)	60.7 (15.9)	63.1 (17.3)	71.4 (21.9)	76.3 (24.6)	85.2 (29.6)	87.3 (30.7)	86.6 (30.3)	85.3 (29.6)	76.5 (24.7)	69.5 (20.8)	61.1 (16.2)	89.5 (31.9)
Mean daily maximum °F (°C)	46.5 (8.1)	45.0 (7.2)	48.2 (9.0)	52.0 (11.1)	60.6 (15.9)	69.8 (21.0)	77.8 (25.4)	77.4 (25.2)	72.9 (22.7)	62.9 (17.2)	51.2 (10.7)	44.8 (7.1)	59.1 (15.1)
Daily mean °F (°C)	40.4 (4.7)	39.0 (3.9)	41.5 (5.3)	44.8 (7.1)	53.1 (11.7)	62.1 (16.7)	70.2 (21.2)	69.8 (21.0)	65.1 (18.4)	55.5 (13.1)	45.1 (7.3)	39.2 (4.0)	52.2 (11.2)
Mean daily minimum °F (°C)	34.4 (1.3)	33.1 (0.6)	34.7 (1.5)	37.5 (3.1)	45.6 (7.6)	54.4 (12.4)	62.7 (17.1)	62.1 (16.7)	57.2 (14.0)	48.1 (8.9)	39.0 (3.9)	33.6 (0.9)	45.2 (7.3)
Mean minimum °F (°C)	21.6 (−5.8)	19.9 (−6.7)	23.0 (−5.0)	24.9 (−3.9)	31.6 (−0.2)	38.5 (3.6)	53.9 (12.2)	52.9 (11.6)	41.2 (5.1)	33.0 (0.6)	25.8 (−3.4)	20.3 (−6.5)	16.5 (−8.6)
Record low °F (°C)	5 (−15)	6 (−14)	9 (−13)	17 (−8)	21 (−6)	28 (−2)	36 (2)	35 (2)	27 (−3)	17 (−8)	13 (−11)	3 (−16)	3 (−16)
Average precipitation inches (mm)	10.37 (263)	10.02 (255)	9.40 (239)	4.98 (126)	3.71 (94)	1.20 (30)	0.09 (2.3)	0.28 (7.1)	1.03 (26)	3.87 (98)	8.59 (218)	11.56 (294)	65.1 (1,652.4)
Average snowfall inches (cm)	48.1 (122)	43.5 (110)	49.8 (126)	25.0 (64)	7.5 (19)	0.6 (1.5)	0.0 (0.0)	0.0 (0.0)	0.4 (1.0)	2.7 (6.9)	24.0 (61)	38.8 (99)	240.3 (610)
Average precipitation days (≥ 0.01 in)	11.5	11.8	11.6	10.5	6.0	2.6	0.6	1.1	2.8	6.1	10.5	14.4	89.5
Source 1: NOAA (mean maxima and minima 2006–2020)
Source 2: WRCC (snowfall 1940–2012)

== See also ==
- Blue Canyon – Nyack Airport
- Extremes on Earth
- List of weather records
