= List of SacRT light rail stations =

Map of the SacRT light rail system

The Sacramento Regional Transit District, commonly known as SacRT, operates a light rail system, serving portions of greater Sacramento, California, United States. The network consists of three lines, the Blue and Gold lines that both opened in 1987 and the Green Line that opened in 2012. The 43-mile (69 km) network serves over 56,800 passengers a day as of 2012, making it the 10th-largest light rail system in the United States in terms of ridership.

The stations along the network are open-air structures featuring passenger canopies for protection from adverse weather. Twenty-six stations offer bus transfer services and eighteen have free park-and-ride lots with a total of 7,379 available parking spaces. Works of public art included at several stations were developed as part of the RT Public Art Program, and represent an array of media including, mosaics, sculptures, metalwork and murals. Each was commissioned to incorporate an identity and sense of place unique to the neighborhood surrounding the station.

Light rail service began on March 12, 1987, with the opening of 13 stations between Watt/I-80 and 8th & O. The second phase of the initial line opened on September 5, 1987, with 13 stations between Archives Plaza and Butterfield. In 1994, a pair of infill stations opened at 39th Street and 48th Street. Included originally as part of the network, both stations were deferred resulting from neighborhood opposition only to be built later due to changing attitudes towards the rail project. In 1998, Mather Field / Mills opened at Rancho Cordova as the first extension to the original network. The District opened 17 stations as part of multiple expansion projects between 2003 and 2007, resulting in the construction of stations in Sacramento, Rancho Cordova, Gold River and Folsom. On June 15, 2012, 7th & Richards / Township 9 opened as the first new station constructed for the Green Line. Three additional stations were opened on the Blue Line on August 24, 2015, extending the line 4.3 miles (6.9 km) to Cosumnes River College; a fourth station on the extension, Morrison Creek, opened in August 2021.

Still in the conceptual phase of development, the Green Line will add approximately 13 miles (21 km) of track in connecting Downtown Sacramento with the Sacramento International Airport.

== Stations ==
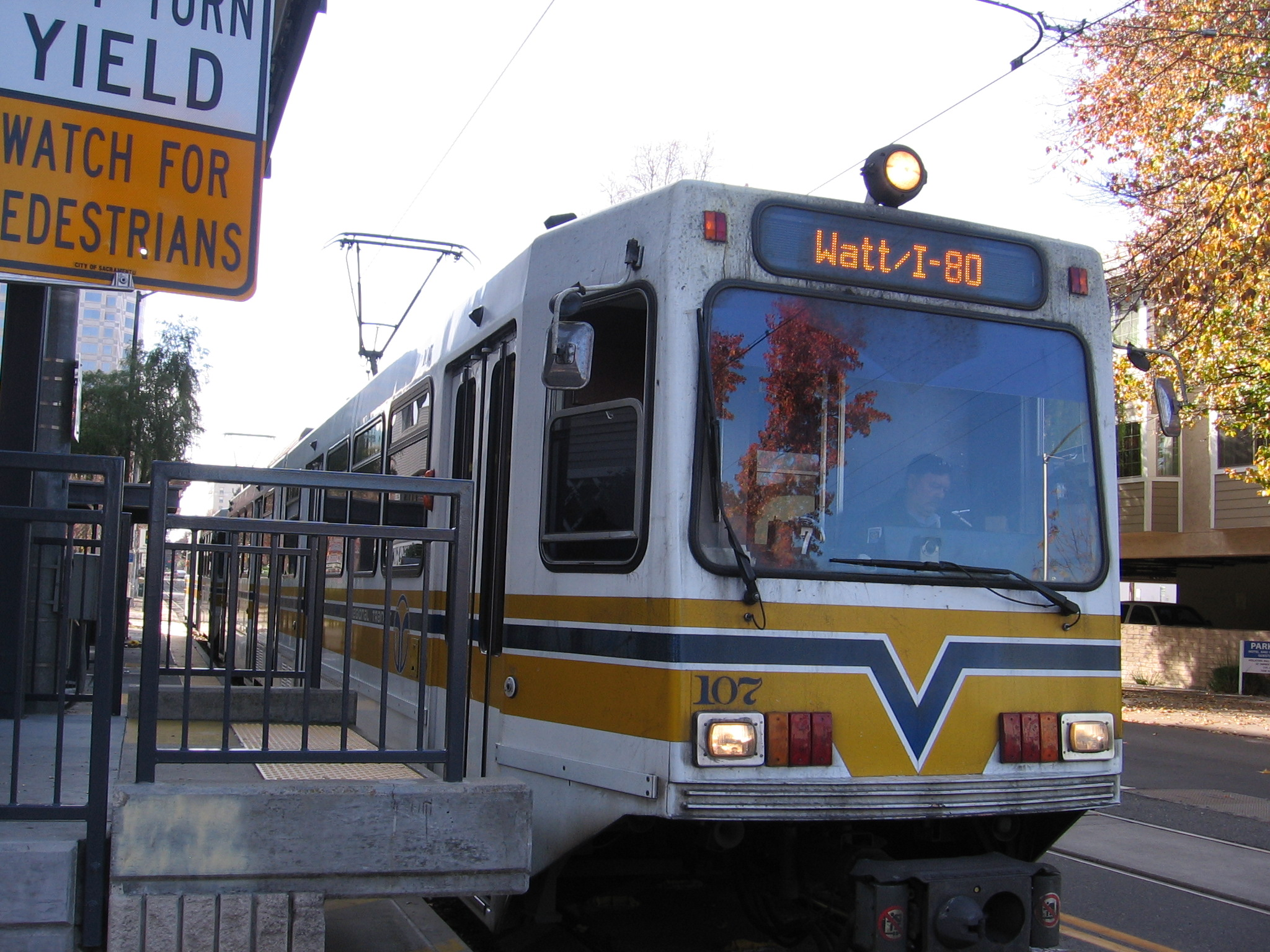
12th & I station

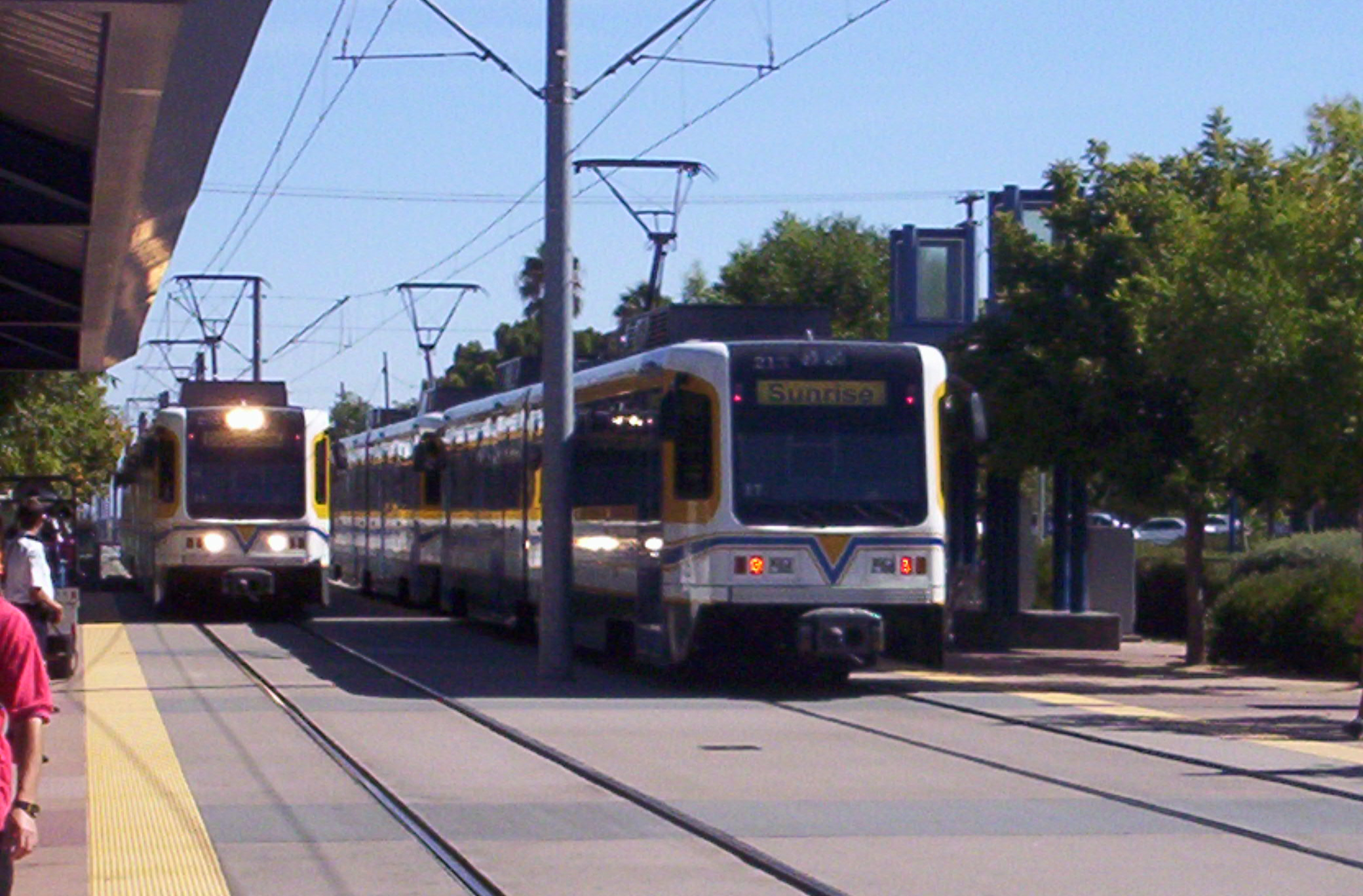
Mather Field / Mills Station

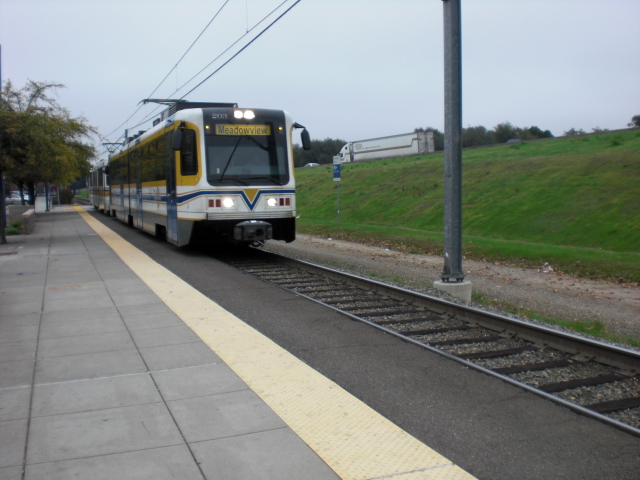
Roseville Road Station

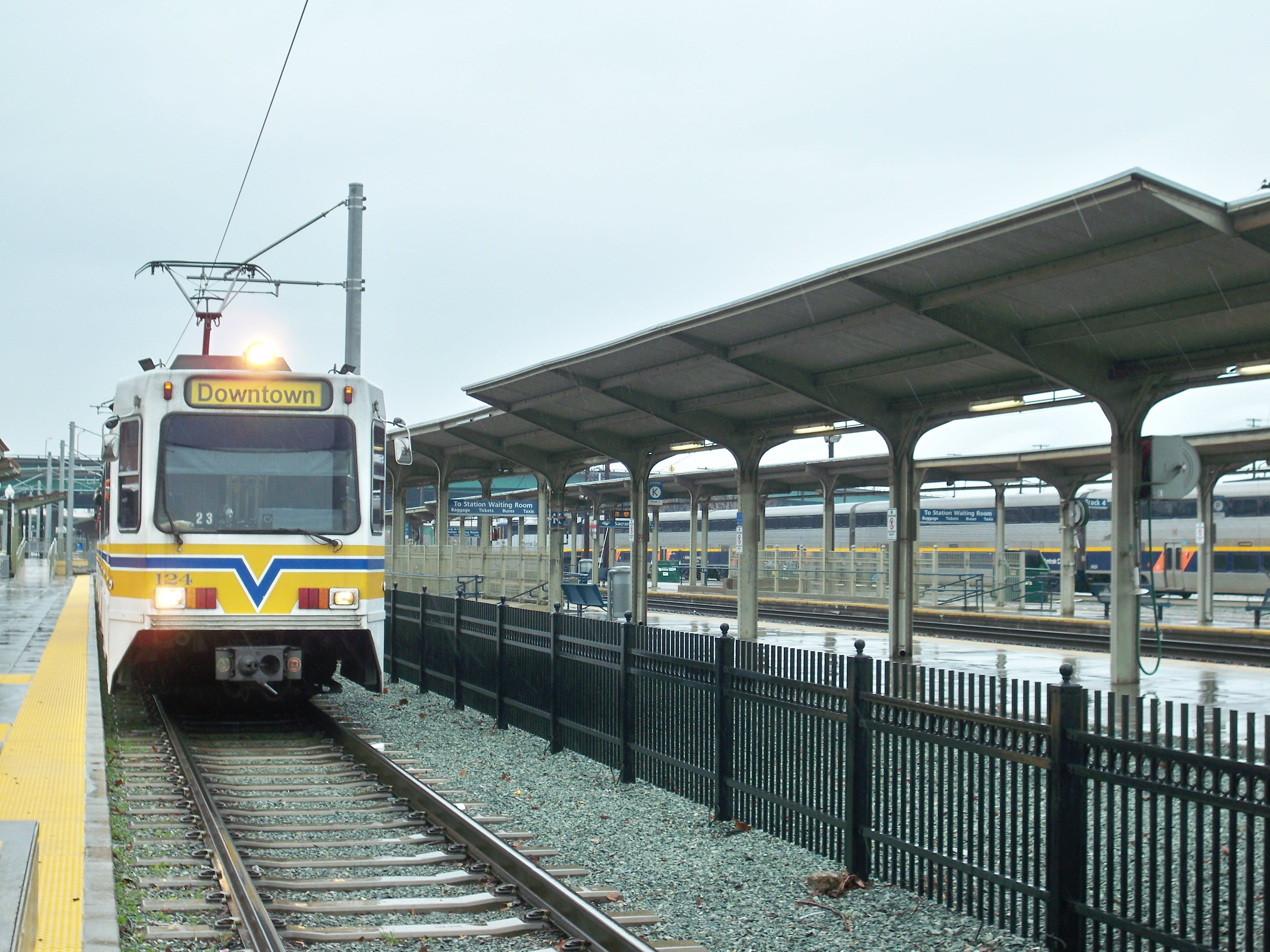
Sacramento Valley station, connects to Amtrak services

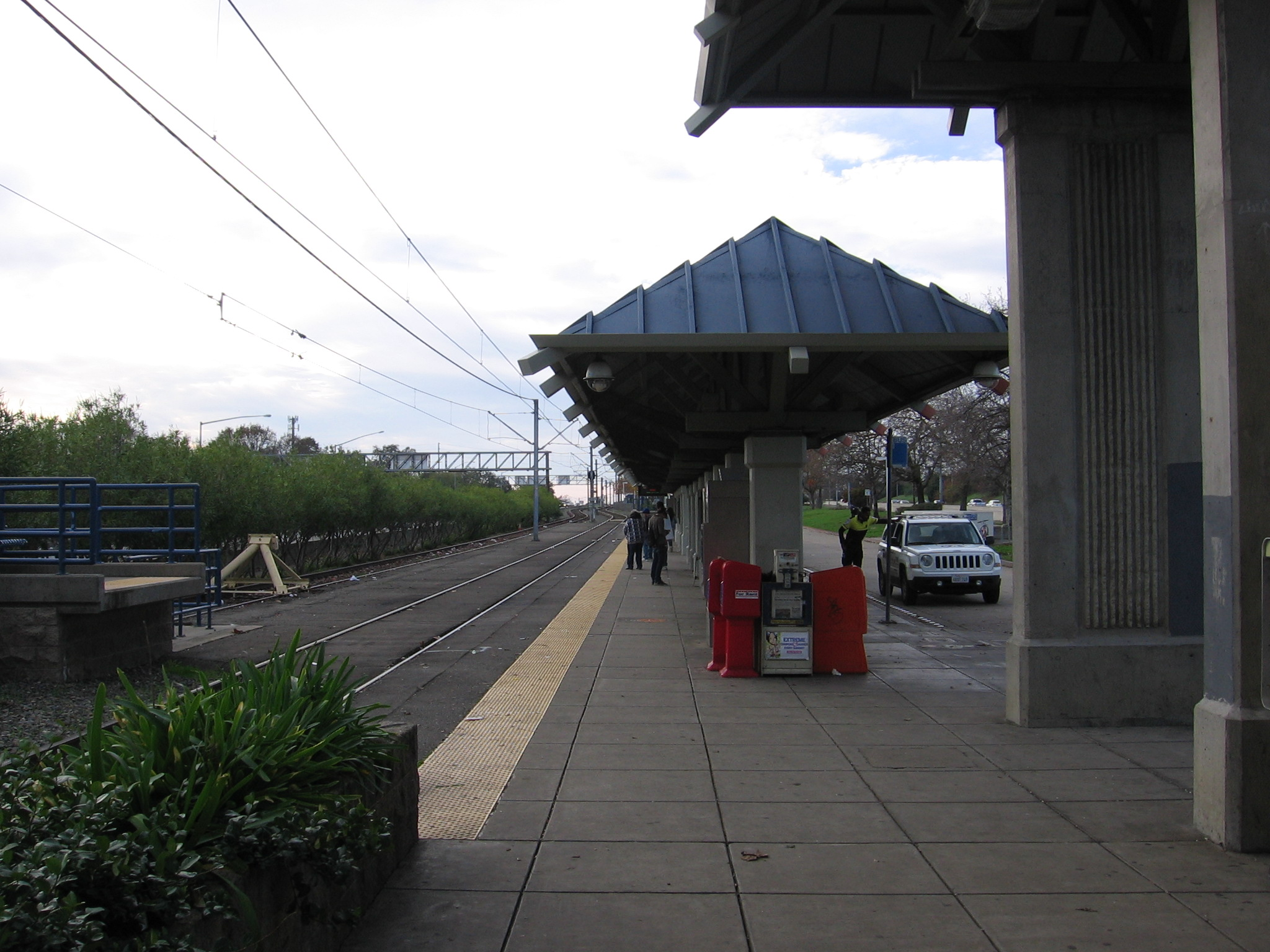
Watt/I-80 station

| * | Official transfer stations |
| † | Terminal stations |
| | Request stop |

| Station | Lines | Jurisdiction | Opened | Ref. |
|---|---|---|---|---|
| 4th Avenue / Wayne Hultgren | Blue Line | Sacramento | September 26, 2003 | |
| 7th & Capitol and 8th & Capitol* | Blue Line Gold Line Green Line | Sacramento | March 12, 1987 | |
| 7th & I | Gold Line Green Line | Sacramento | December 8, 2006 | |
| 8th & H | Gold Line Green Line | Sacramento | January 9, 2012 | |
| 7th & Richards / Township 9† | Green Line | Sacramento | June 15, 2012 | |
| 7th & Railyards | Green Line | Sacramento | October 15, 2026 | |
| 8th & O | Blue Line Gold Line Green Line | Sacramento | March 12, 1987 | |
| 12th & I | Blue Line | Sacramento | March 12, 1987 | |
| 13th Street* | Blue Line Gold Line Green Line | Sacramento | September 5, 1987 | |
| 16th Street* | Blue Line Gold Line | Sacramento | September 5, 1987 | |
| 23rd Street | Gold Line | Sacramento | September 5, 1987 | |
| 29th Street | Gold Line | Sacramento | September 5, 1987 | |
| 39th Street/UC Davis Health | Gold Line | Sacramento | July 14, 1994 | |
| 47th Avenue | Blue Line | Sacramento | September 26, 2003 | |
| 48th Street | Gold Line | Sacramento | July 14, 1994 | |
| 59th Street | Gold Line | Sacramento | September 5, 1987 | |
| Alkali Flat / La Valentina | Blue Line | Sacramento | March 12, 1987 | |
| Archives Plaza | Blue Line Gold Line Green Line | Sacramento | September 5, 1987 | |
| Arden / Del Paso | Blue Line | Sacramento | March 12, 1987 | |
| Broadway | Blue Line | Sacramento | September 26, 2003 | |
| Butterfield | Gold Line | La Riviera | September 5, 1987 | |
| Cathedral Square | Blue Line | Sacramento | March 12, 1987 | |
| Center Parkway | Blue Line | Sacramento | August 24, 2015 | |
| City College | Blue Line | Sacramento | September 26, 2003 | |
| College Greens | Gold Line | Sacramento | September 5, 1987 | |
| Cordova Town Center | Gold Line | Rancho Cordova | June 11, 2004 | |
| Cosumnes River College† | Blue Line | Sacramento | August 24, 2015 | |
| 7th & I and 8th & H / County Center | Gold Line Green Line | Sacramento | March 8, 2007 | |
| Dos Rios | Blue Line | Sacramento | September 28, 2026 | |
| Florin | Blue Line | Sacramento | September 26, 2003 | |
| Franklin | Blue Line | Sacramento | August 24, 2015 | |
| Fruitridge | Blue Line | Sacramento | September 26, 2003 | |
| Glenn | Gold Line | Folsom | October 15, 2005 | |
| Globe | Blue Line | Sacramento | March 12, 1987 | |
| Hazel | Gold Line | Gold River | October 15, 2005 | |
| Historic Folsom† | Gold Line | Folsom | October 15, 2005 | |
| Iron Point | Gold Line | Folsom | October 15, 2005 | |
| Marconi Arcade | Blue Line | Sacramento | March 12, 1987 | |
| Mather Field / Mills | Gold Line | Rancho Cordova | September 6, 1998 | |
| Meadowview | Blue Line | Sacramento | September 26, 2003 | |
| Morrison Creek | Blue Line | Sacramento | August 29, 2021 | |
| Power Inn | Gold Line | Sacramento | September 5, 1987 | |
| Roseville Road | Blue Line | Sacramento | March 12, 1987 | |
| Royal Oaks | Blue Line | Sacramento | March 12, 1987 | |
| Sacramento Valley† | Gold Line | Sacramento | December 8, 2006 | |
| St. Rose of Lima Park | Blue Line | Sacramento | March 12, 1987 | |
| Starfire | Gold Line | Rosemont | September 5, 1987 | |
| Sunrise | Gold Line | Rancho Cordova | June 11, 2004 | |
| Swanston | Blue Line | Sacramento | March 12, 1987 | |
| Tiber | Gold Line | La Riviera | September 5, 1987 | |
| University / 65th Street | Gold Line | Sacramento | September 5, 1987 | |
| Watt/I-80† | Blue Line | North Highlands | March 12, 1987 | |
| Watt / I-80 West | Blue Line | Sacramento | March 12, 1987 | |
| Watt/Manlove | Gold Line | Rosemont | September 5, 1987 | |
| Zinfandel | Gold Line | Rancho Cordova | June 11, 2004 | |

== Proposed Stations ==
| Station | Lines | Jurisdiction | Projected opening | Reference |
|---|---|---|---|---|
| Horn | Gold Line | Rancho Cordova | 2029 | |
