= Morrison Creek station =

SacRT light rail station

Morrison Creek
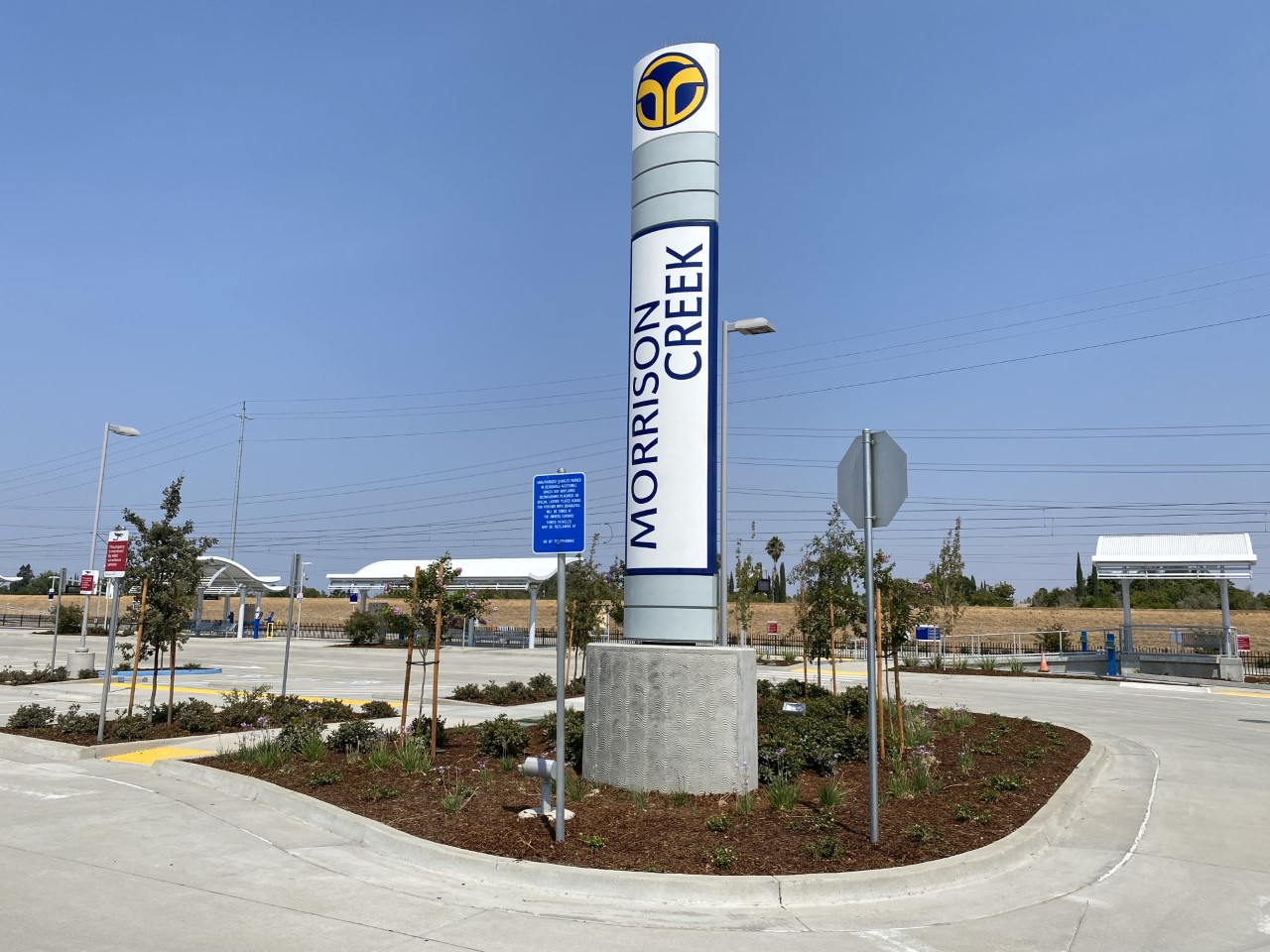
- Morrison Creek station pylon

General information
- Location: Sacramento, California; United States
- Coordinates: 38°27′58.6″N 121°27′47.2″W
- Owner: Sacramento Regional Transit District
- Platforms: 2 side platforms
- Tracks: 2

Construction
- Structure type: At-grade
- Parking: 75 spaces (not in use)
- Cycle facilities: Racks
- Accessible: Yes

History
- Opened: August 29, 2021

Services
| Preceding station | SacRT | Following station |
|---|---|---|
| Meadowview toward Watt/I-80 | Blue Line | Franklin toward Cosumnes River College |
Location

Morrison Creek station is a side platformed SacRT light rail station in Sacramento, California, United States. The station was opened on August 29, 2021, and is operated by the Sacramento Regional Transit District. It is served by the Blue Line. The station is adjacent to Morrison Creek, for which the station is named. Because of expected low patronage, the station is a "request stop" with riders needing to press a button on the platform to signal trains to stop.

The station platform was built as part of the extension of the Blue Line to Cosumnes River College that opened in August 2015, but Morrison Creek station did not open at that time. The station was planned in anticipation of the construction of transit-oriented development next to the site, and includes a 75-space park and ride lot and a bus transfer area, but currently the area is undeveloped and the station site is not connected to any nearby roads.

The station remained untouched until 2021, when SacRT was faced with a deadline to use federal funding allocated to the project. The agency added missing amenities to the station including shelters and benches, and made it into a "walk-on" station, meaning it is only accessible by bicycle and pedestrian paths. The closest street connection via bike and pedestrian paths is Ann Arbor Way, a neighborhood street north of the station.
