= Meadowview station =

Meadowview
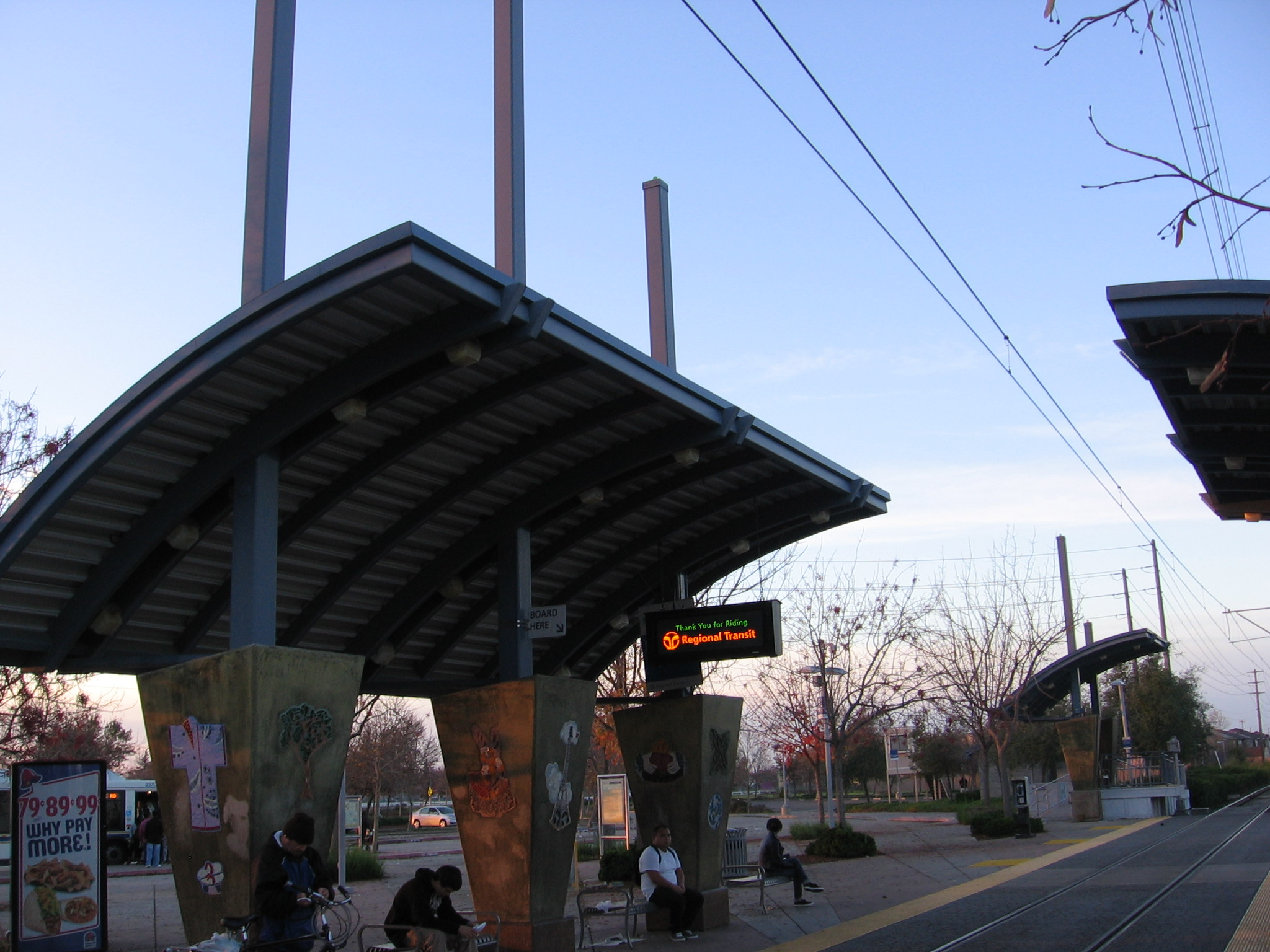

General information
- Location: Meadowview Road at Detroit Boulevard; Sacramento, California; United States
- Coordinates: 38°28′59.56″N 121°28′1.35″W
- Owner: Sacramento Regional Transit District
- Platforms: 1 island platform, 1 side platform
- Tracks: 2
- Connections: Sacramento Regional Transit: 56, 105, SmaRT Ride Franklin−South Sacramento

Construction
- Structure type: At-grade
- Parking: 690 spaces
- Cycle facilities: Lockers
- Accessible: Yes

History
- Opened: September 26, 2003

Services
Preceding station	SacRT	Following station
Florin toward Watt/I-80	Blue Line	Morrison Creek toward Cosumnes River College
Location

Meadowview station is a side platformed Sacramento RT light rail station at the intersection of Meadowview Road and Detroit Boulevard in Sacramento, California, United States. The station was opened on September 26, 2003, and is operated by the Sacramento Regional Transit District. It is served by the Blue Line and was its southern terminus until 2015. With a daily average of 5,400 riders, the Meadowview station is the second busiest in the RT light rail system behind 16th Street station.
