= Dos Rios station =

Railway station in Sacramento, California, USA

Dos Rios
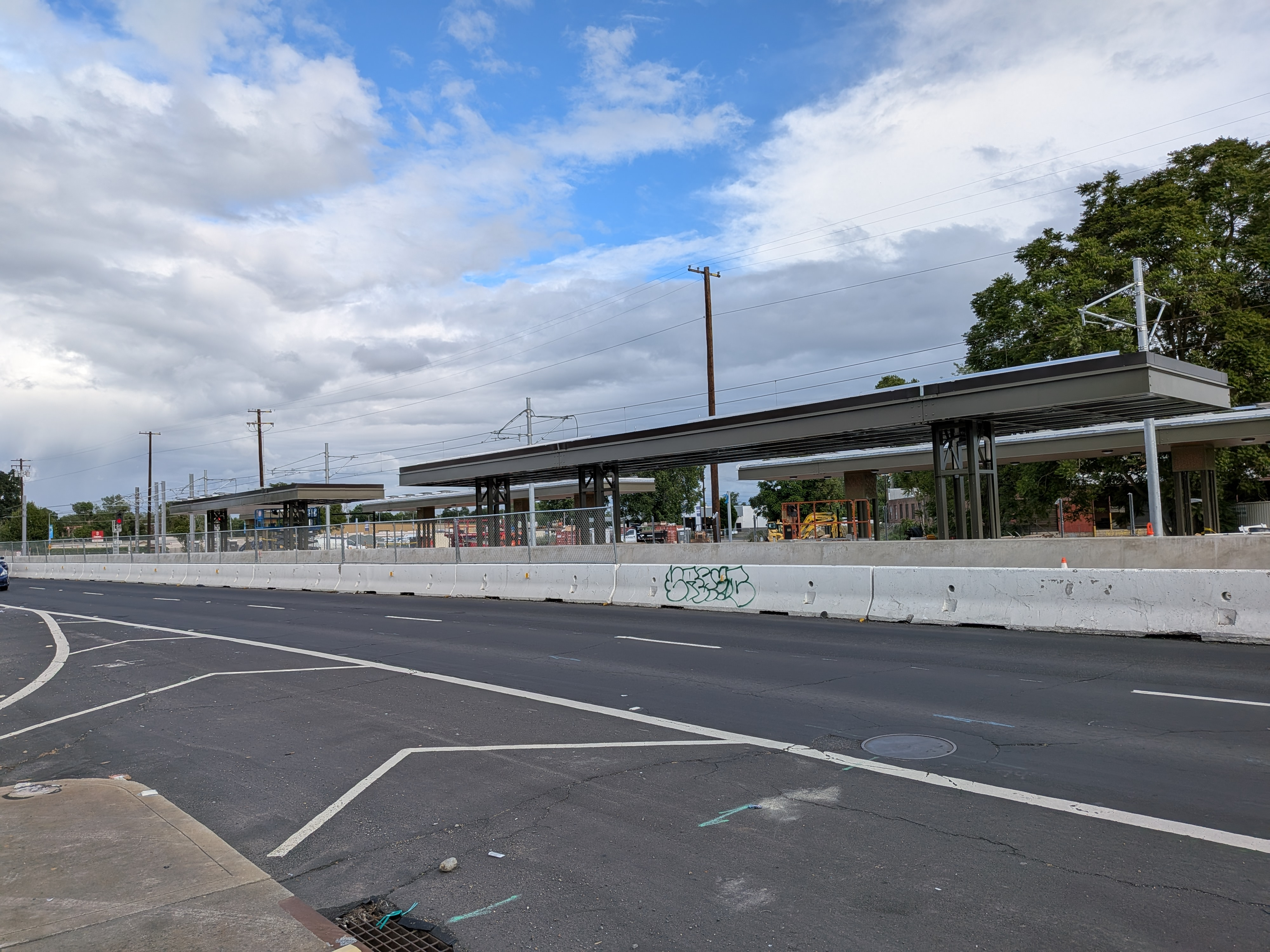
- Station construction in April 2026

General information
- Location: North 12th Street; Sacramento, California; United States
- Coordinates: 38°35′35″N 121°28′51″W
- Owner: Sacramento Regional Transit District
- Platforms: 2 side platforms
- Tracks: 2

Construction
- Structure type: At-grade
- Accessible: Yes

History
- Opened: September 28, 2026

Services
Preceding station	SacRT	Following station
Globe toward Watt/I-80	Blue Line	Alkali Flat / La Valentina toward Cosumnes River College
Location

Dos Rios (Spanish for Two Rivers) is a SacRT light rail in Sacramento, California, served by the Blue Line. The staggered platforms are located on North 12th Street between Sunbeam Avenue and Richards Boulevard. The station was built as an infill station to provide light rail service to the adjacent Twin Rivers low-income housing development and received partial funding from a grant by the California Strategic Growth Council. The station opened on September 28, 2026.
