= 47th Avenue station =

47th Avenue
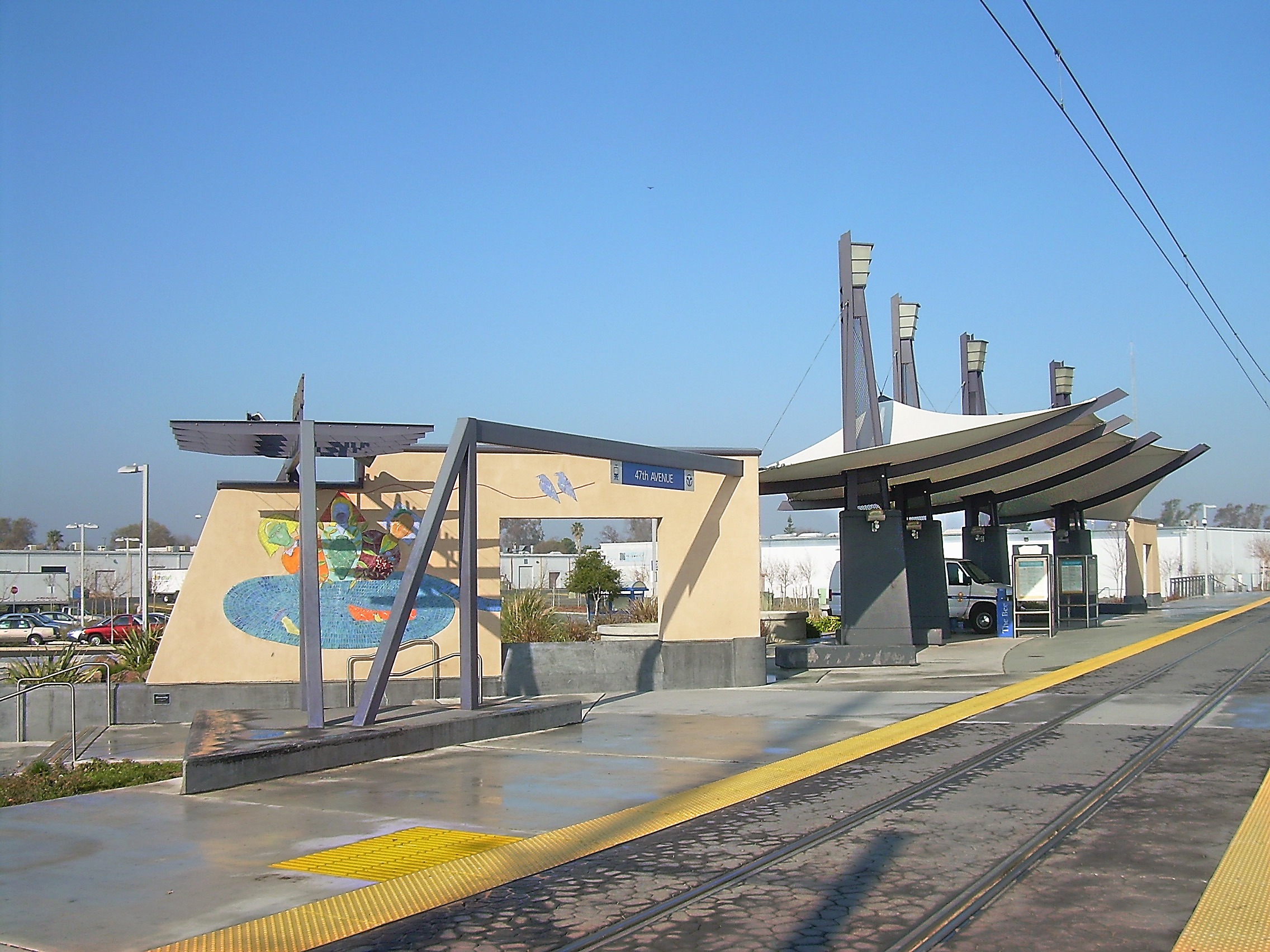
- 47th Avenue station platform

General information
- Location: 47th Avenue at 27th Street; Sacramento, California; United States
- Coordinates: 38°30′42.86″N 121°28′33.36″W
- Owner: Sacramento Regional Transit District
- Platforms: 1 side platform, 1 island platform
- Tracks: 2
- Connections: Sacramento Regional Transit: SmaRT Ride Franklin−South Sacramento

Construction
- Structure type: At-grade
- Parking: 423 spaces
- Accessible: Yes

History
- Opened: September 26, 2003

Services
Preceding station	SacRT	Following station
Fruitridge toward Watt/I-80	Blue Line	Florin toward Cosumnes River College
Location

47th Avenue station is an at-grade light rail station on the Blue Line of the SacRT light rail system operated by the Sacramento Regional Transit District. The station is located in an exclusive right of way alongside the Union Pacific Railroad's Sacramento Subdivision at its intersection with 47th Avenue, after which the station is named, in the city of Sacramento, California.

The station is located on the northwest side of 47th Avenue, and serves as Campbell's manufacturing facility, surrounding industrial areas, and the 47th Avenue, Hogan, and 24th Street neighborhoods.

== Platforms and tracks ==
Like nearly all stations built as part of the Blue Line Southwest Extension, 47th Avenue station has a rather unique layout with an island platform serving northbound trains and a side platform boarding area for southbound trains, integrated into a plaza that leads into the 423 space park and ride lot. The southbound tracks are embedded in the pavement, allowing passengers to cross to the northbound platform from any point in the plaza. The layout is both efficient and a cost-effective way of providing a pedestrian-train interface.
