= Globe station =

Stop on the SacRT light rail Blue Line

Globe
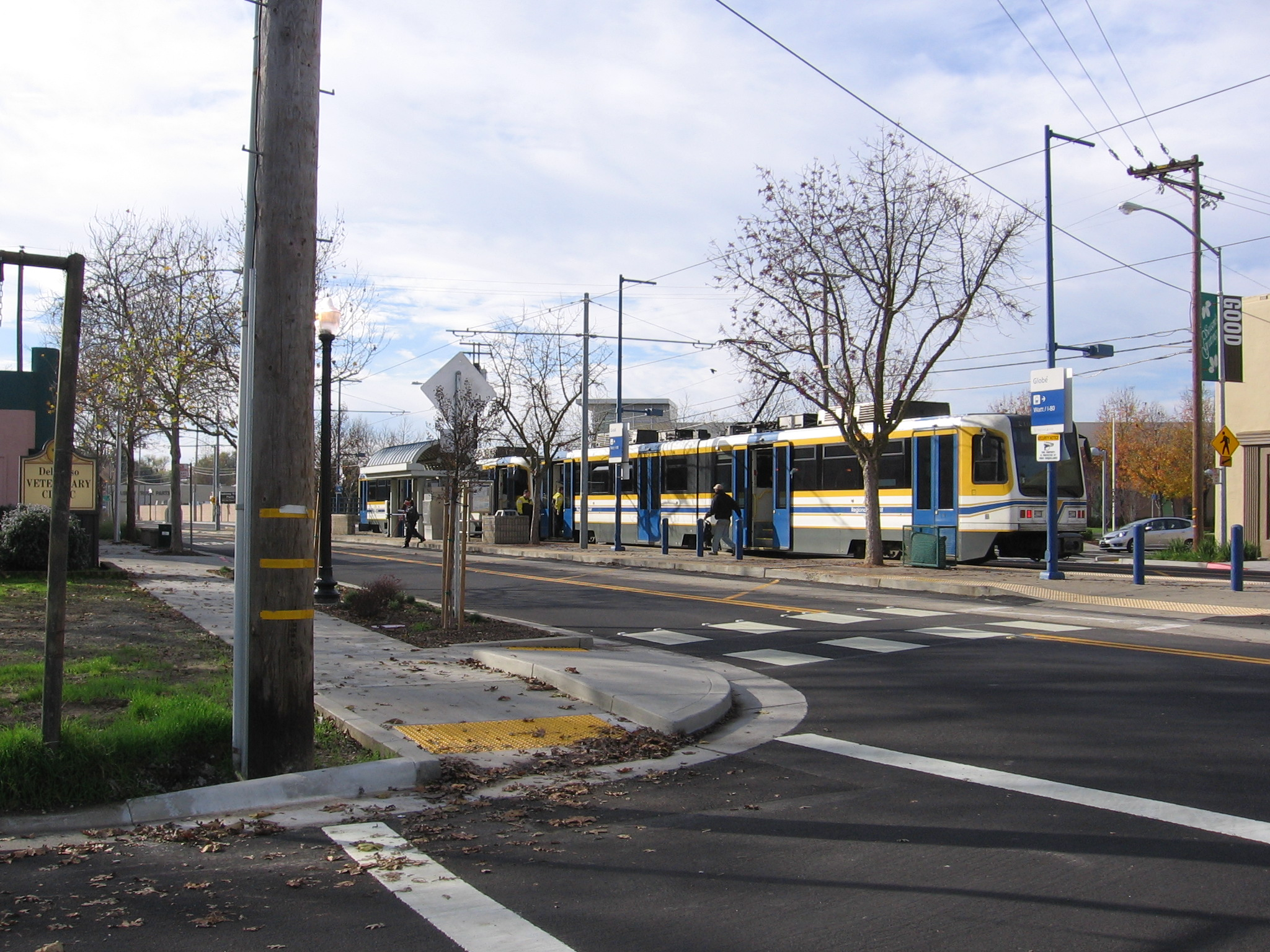
- Light rail train at Globe station in December 2012

General information
- Location: Del Paso Boulevard at Globe Avenue; Sacramento, California; United States
- Coordinates: 38°36′10″N 121°27′57″W
- Owner: Sacramento Regional Transit District
- Platforms: 1 island platform
- Tracks: 2

Construction
- Structure type: At-grade
- Accessible: Yes

History
- Opened: March 12, 1987

Services
Preceding station	SacRT	Following station
Arden/Del Paso toward Watt/I-80	Blue Line	Dos Rios toward Cosumnes River College
Former services
Preceding station	Western Pacific Railroad	Following station
Sacramento toward Oakland	Feather River Route	Gardenland toward Salt Lake City
Location

Globe station is an at-grade light rail station on the Blue Line of the SacRT light rail system operated by the Sacramento Regional Transit District. The station is located in the median of Del Paso Boulevard at its intersection with Globe Avenue, after which the station is named, in the city of Sacramento, California.

South of the station, the line becomes single track and runs alongside the southbound lanes of California State Route 160 as it crosses the American River and the Sacramento Subdivision of the Union Pacific Railroad.

Altamont Corridor Express and Gold Runner services are planned to stop at a nearby Old North Sacramento station when those lines are extended to Sacramento. A new platform will be constructed along the Sacramento Subdivision by 2029 to facilitate the commuter rail and inter-city trains.
