= Florin station =

Florin
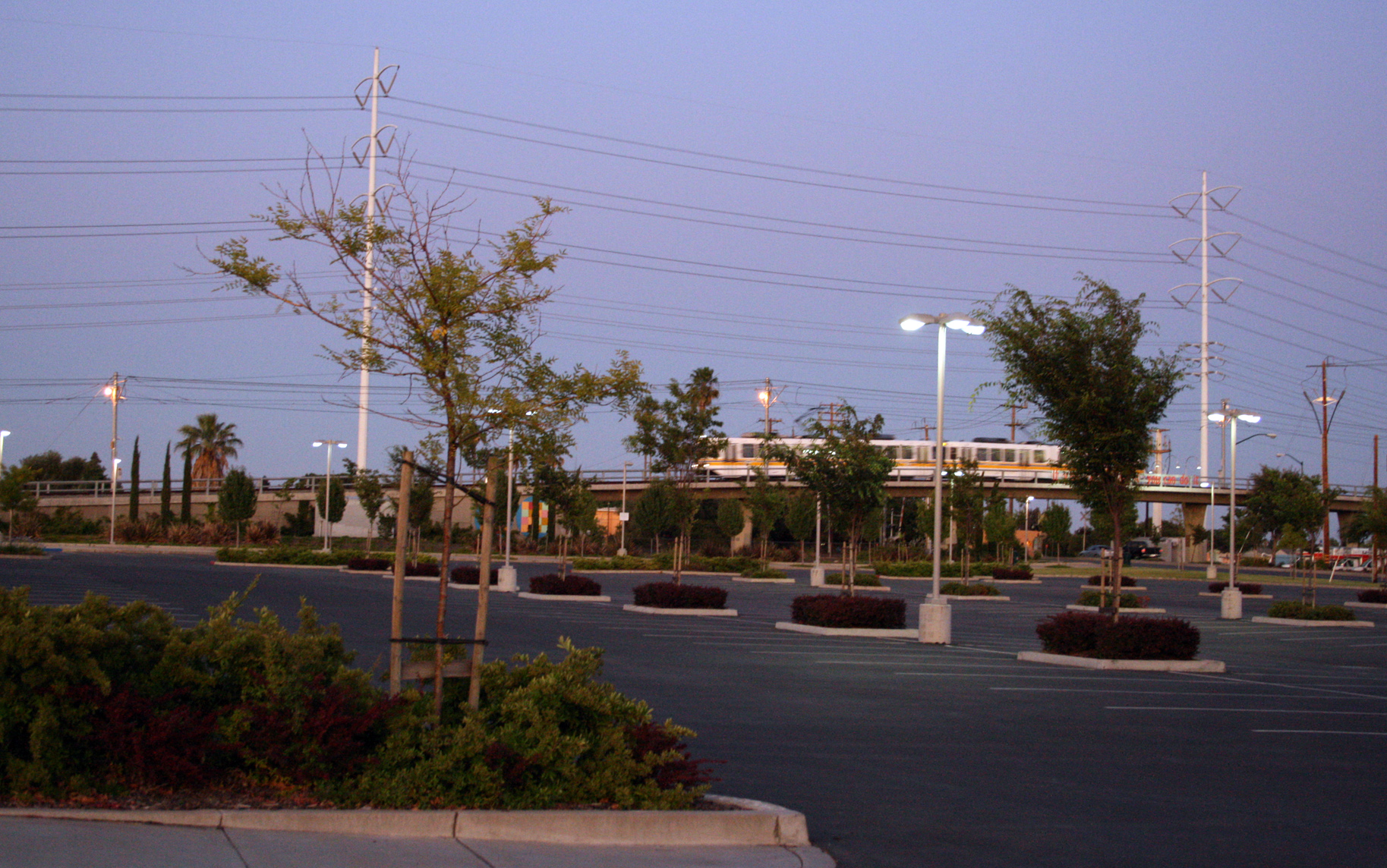
- Florin station parking lot, with a Sacramento RT train in the background

General information
- Location: Florin Road at Indian Lane; Sacramento, California; United States
- Coordinates: 38°29′52.18″N 121°28′17.64″W
- Owner: Sacramento Regional Transit District
- Platforms: 1 side platform, 1 island platform
- Tracks: 2
- Connections: Sacramento Regional Transit: 81, SmaRT Ride Franklin−South Sacramento

Construction
- Structure type: At-grade
- Parking: 1,076 spaces
- Cycle facilities: Lockers
- Accessible: Yes

History
- Opened: September 26, 2003

Services
Preceding station	SacRT	Following station
47th Avenue toward Watt/I-80	Blue Line	Meadowview toward Cosumnes River College
Location

Florin station is a side platformed Sacramento RT light rail station in Sacramento, California, United States. The station was opened on September 26, 2003, and is operated by the Sacramento Regional Transit District. It is served by the Blue Line. The station is located north of Florin Road at Indian Lane, and serves the surrounding residential and commercial areas along Florin Road, the Department of Human Assistance, and Luther Burbank High School.

== Gallery ==
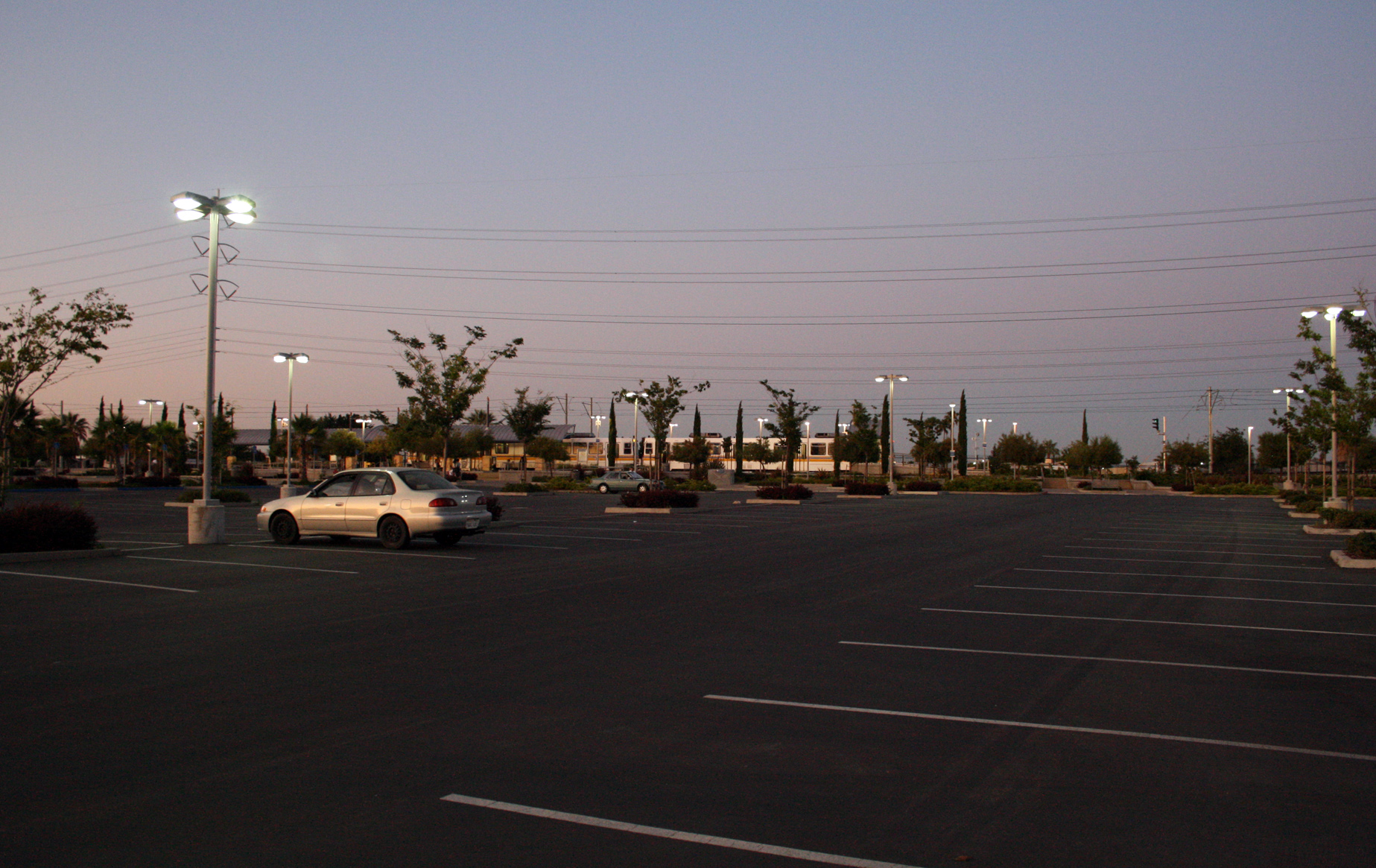
The Florin Station parking lot

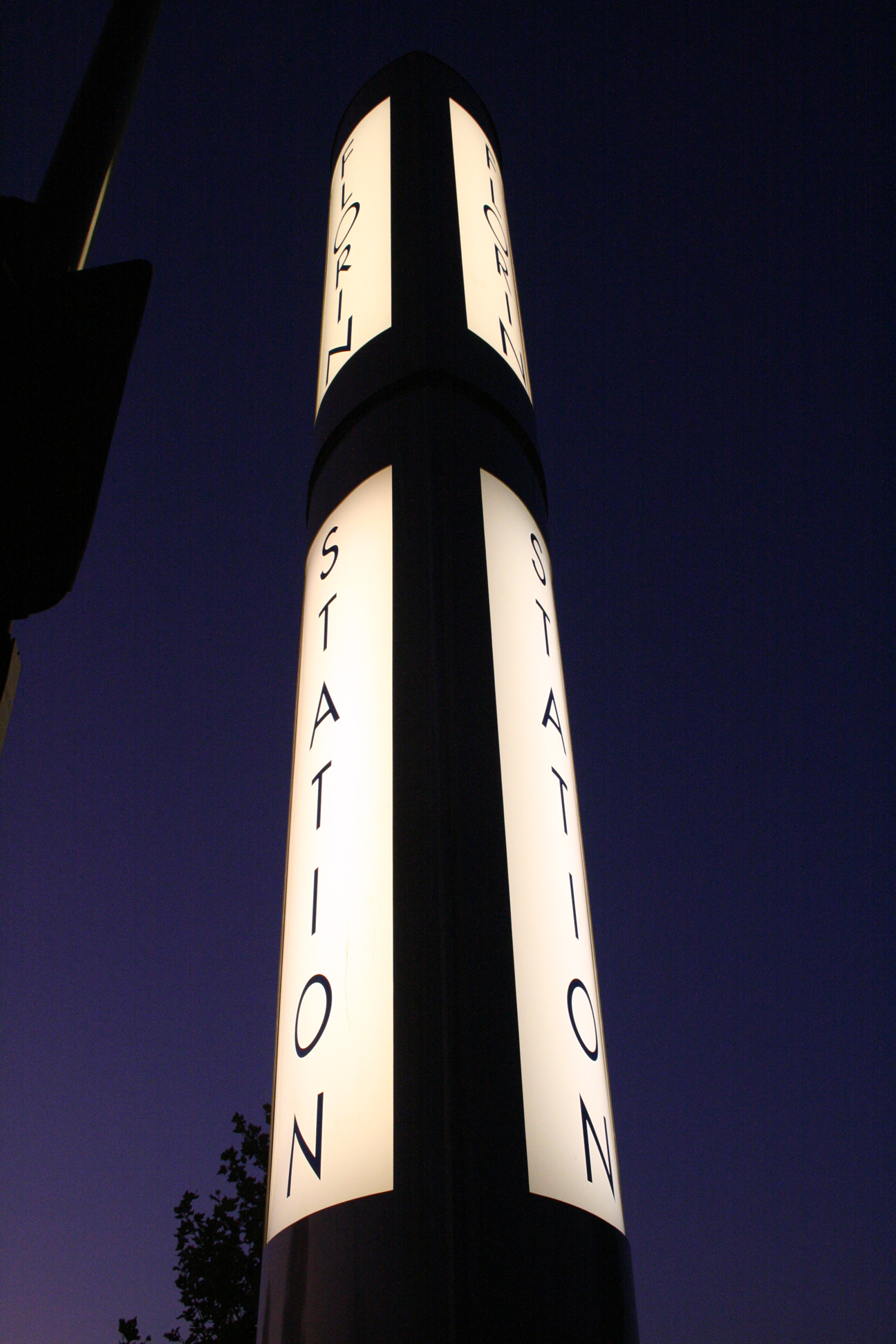
Florin Station sign
