= Center Parkway station =

Center Parkway station may refer to:

- Center Parkway station (Sacramento), a light rail station in Sacramento, California
- Center Parkway/Washington station, a light rail station in Tempe, Arizona
- Richmond Parkway Transit Center, a bus terminal and park and ride lot in Richmond, California

== See also ==
- List of Parkway railway stations in Britain
