= 16th Street station (Sacramento) =

Light rail station in Sacramento, California, United States

16th Street
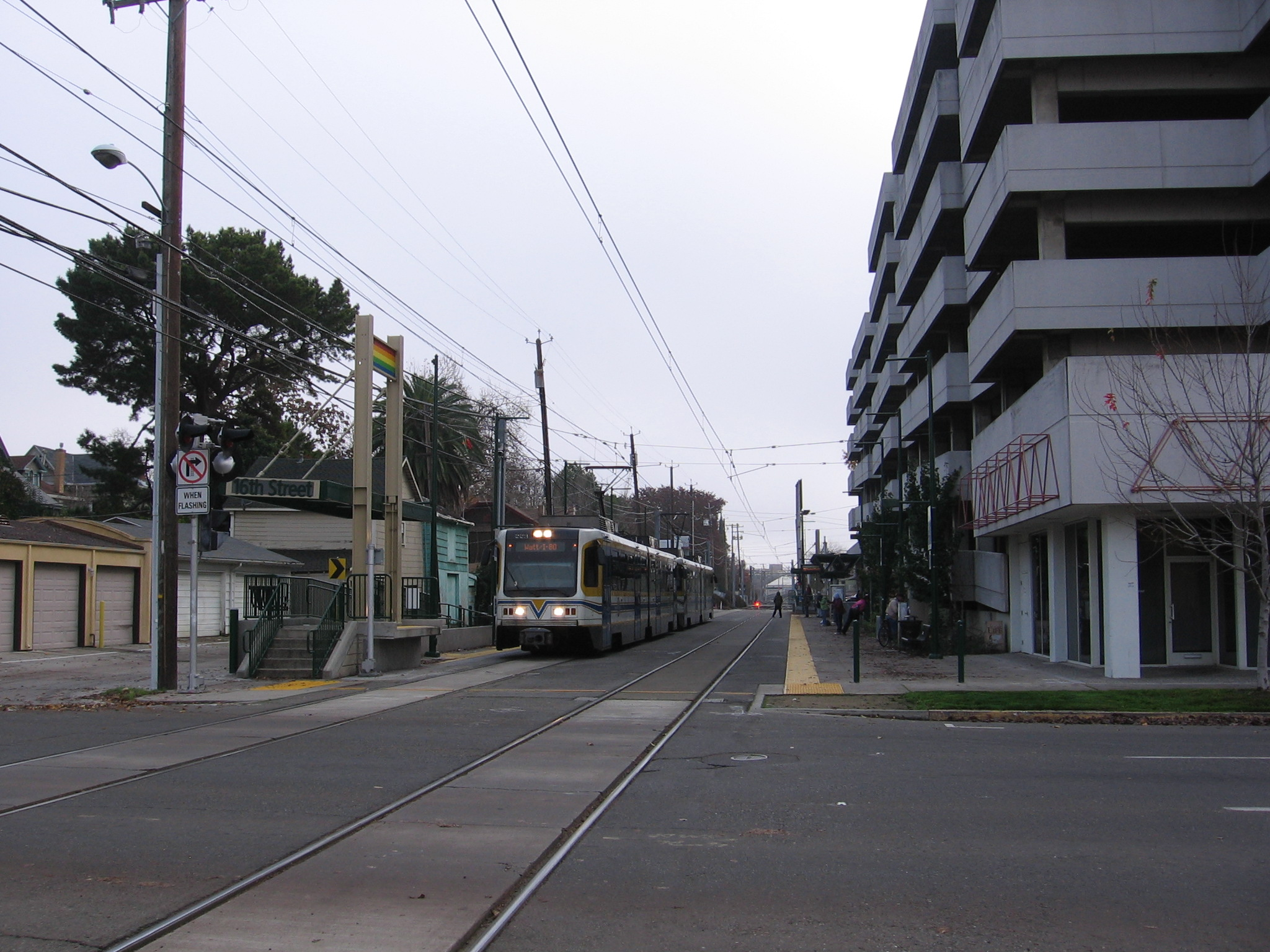

General information
- Location: 16th Street at R Street; Sacramento, California; United States
- Coordinates: 38°34′11.79″N 121°29′22.04″W
- Owner: Sacramento RT
- Platforms: 2 side platforms
- Connections: Bus Route 6

Construction
- Structure type: at-grade
- Accessible: Yes

History
- Opened: September 5, 1987; 38 years ago

Services
Preceding station	SacRT	Following station
13th Street toward Watt/I-80	Blue Line	Broadway toward Cosumnes River College
13th Street toward Sacramento Valley Station	Gold Line	23rd Street toward Historic Folsom
Location

16th Street is a side platformed SacRT light rail station in Downtown Sacramento, California, United States. The station was opened on September 5, 1987, and is operated by the Sacramento Regional Transit District. Located at 16th Street between Q and R Streets (in an alley), it is served by the Gold and Blue Lines and is the easternmost station where transfers can be made between both rail lines. With a daily average of 7,100 riders, the 16th Street station is the busiest in the RT light rail system.
