= Franklin station (Sacramento) =

SacRT light rail station

Franklin
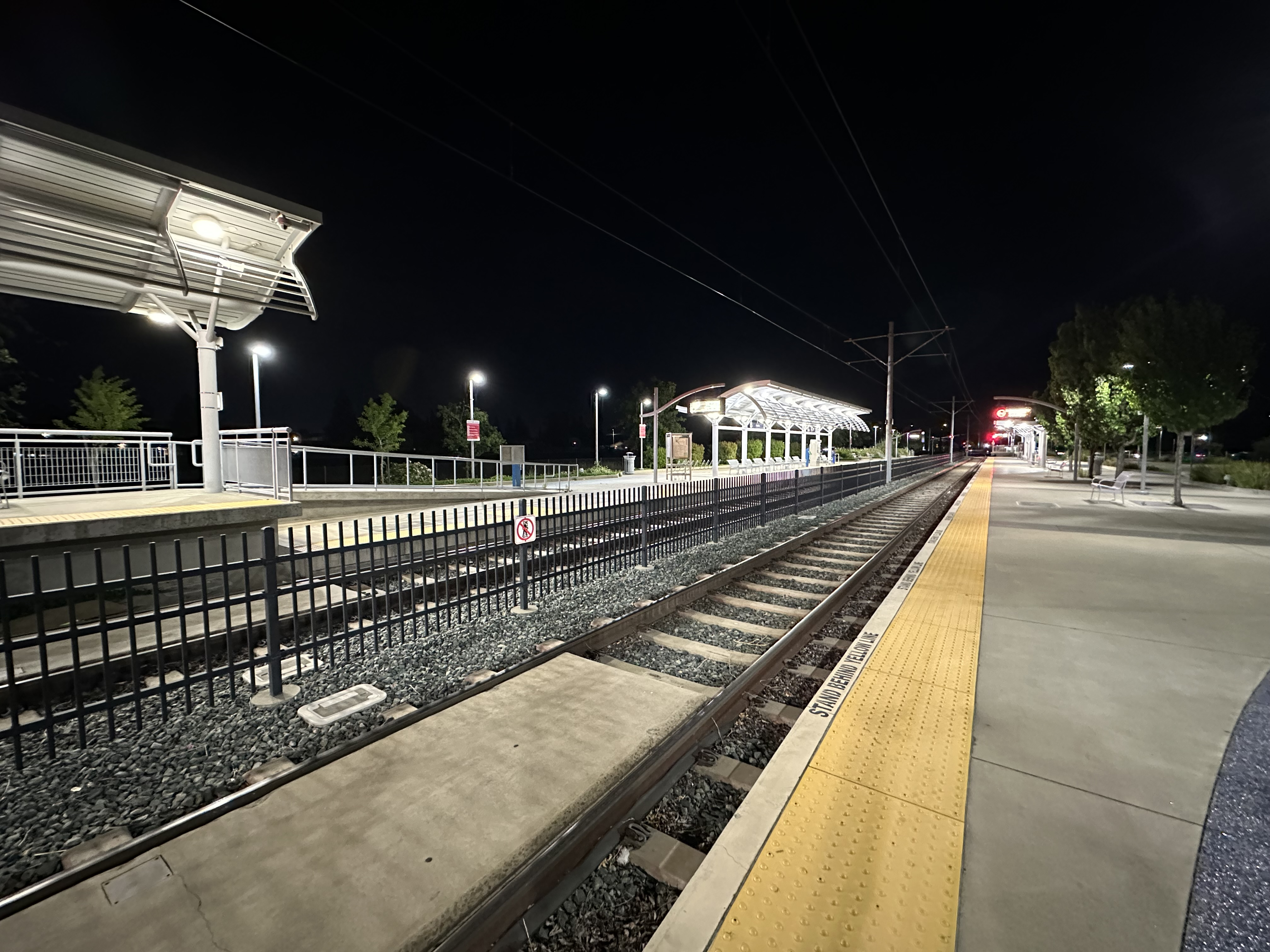
- Franklin station platforms, May 2024

General information
- Location: 4625 Cosumnes River Boulevard; Sacramento, California; United States
- Coordinates: 38°27′47.1″N 121°26′55.0″W
- Owner: Sacramento Regional Transit District
- Platforms: 2 side platforms
- Tracks: 2
- Bus stands: 4
- Connections: Sacramento Regional Transit: SmaRT Ride Franklin−South Sacramento

Construction
- Structure type: At-grade
- Parking: 668 spaces
- Cycle facilities: Racks, lockers
- Accessible: Yes

History
- Opened: August 24, 2015

Services
Preceding station	SacRT	Following station
Morrison Creek toward Watt/I-80	Blue Line	Center Parkway toward Cosumnes River College
Location

Franklin station is a side platformed Sacramento RT light rail station in Sacramento, California, United States. The station was opened on August 24, 2015, and is operated by the Sacramento Regional Transit District. It is served by the Blue Line. The station is located on the north side of Cosumnes River Boulevard west of Franklin Boulevard in the South Sacramento neighborhood of Valley Hi. There is a 668-stall park and ride with a daily fee located at the station.
