= Blue Line (SacRT) =

Light rail line in Sacramento, California

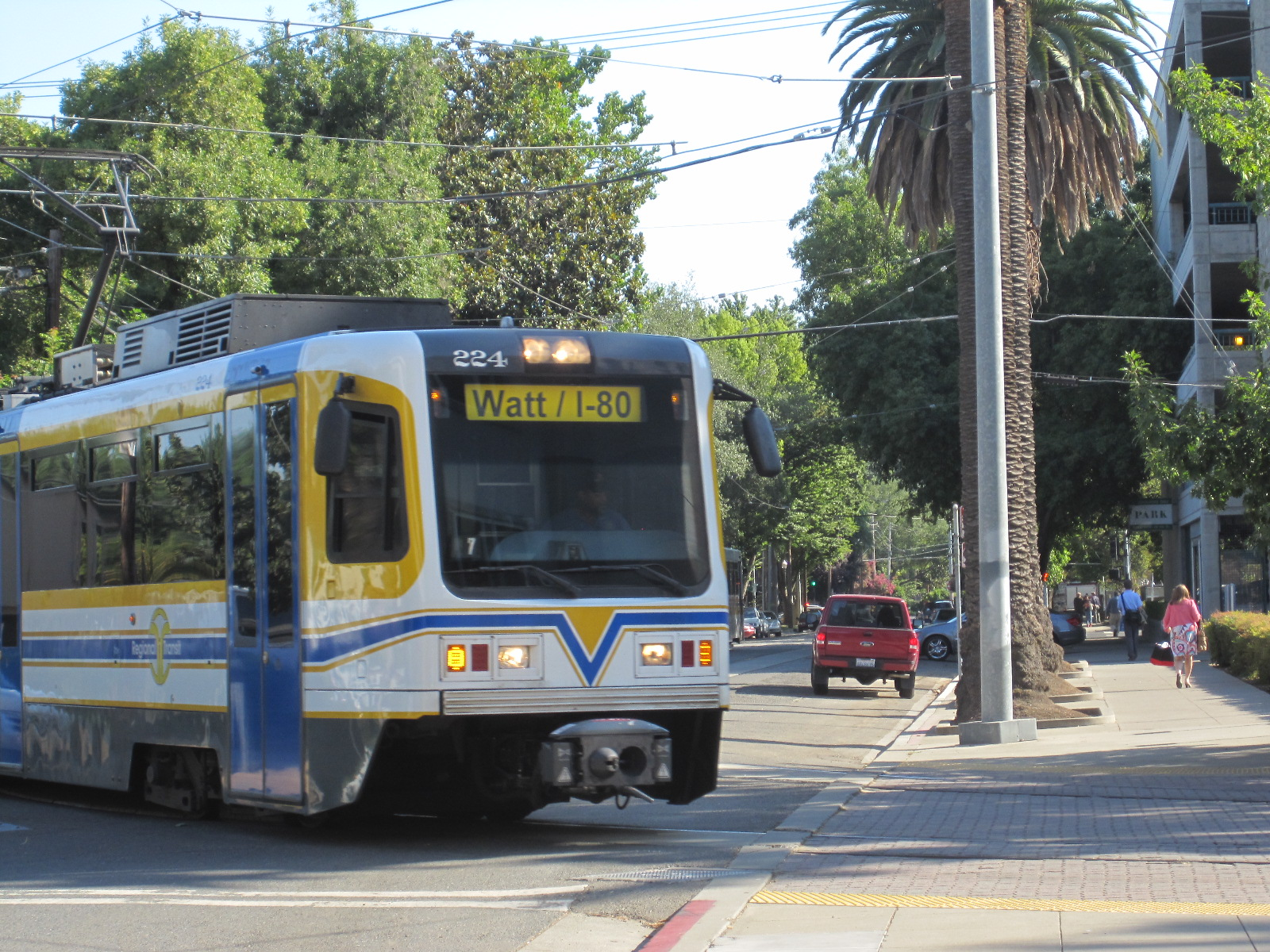

Overview
- Owner: Sacramento Regional Transit District
- Locale: Sacramento, California
- Termini: Watt/I-80 (north); Cosumnes River College (south)
- Stations: 29

Service
- Type: Light rail
- System: SacRT light rail
- Daily ridership: 18,435 (Q2 2018)

History
- Opened: March 12, 1987; 39 years ago (as Watt/I-80–Downtown–Butterfield line)

Technical
- Number of tracks: Mostly 2, 1 track across the American River and in the median of Interstate 80
- Character: Mostly at-grade
- Track gauge: 4 ft 8 1/2 in (1,435 mm) standard gauge
- Electrification: Overhead line, 750 V DC
- Operating speed: 55 mph (89 km/h)
Route map
Blue Line highlighted in blue

The Blue Line is a light rail line in the Sacramento Regional Transit District (SacRT) system. It runs primarily north–south in Sacramento between Watt/I-80 and Cosumnes River College. Along the route, the Blue Line serves North Highlands, North Sacramento, Downtown and South Sacramento. Portions of the Blue Line run along the original initial alignment between Watt/I-80 and 16th Street stations.

== Line description ==
The Blue Line begins at its northern terminus, the Watt/I-80 station. From there it initially travels southwest in the median of I-80, utilizing a bridge from an abandoned freeway project, then parallels Roseville Road before turning westward paralleling Arden Way in North Sacramento. (It passes up the Siemens plant nearby.) Then the line turns southwest again running in the median of Del Paso Boulevard, merges into a single track crossing the 12th Street viaduct (Highway 160) over the American River. Reaching downtown, the Blue Line goes back to two tracks going south on 12th, turns west on K Street, and splits into one-way tracks for 7th and 8th Streets where it joins the Gold and Green Lines. It then turns westward on O Street, southward on 12th, then eastward in an alley paralleling Q and R Streets. After passing the 16th Street station, the Blue Line splits from the Gold Line (the Green Line terminates at 13th Street station), crossing under the Bee Bridge before going south in its own right-of-way into South Sacramento. It then jogs eastward along Cosumnes River Boulevard before crossing it and reaching its southern terminus at Cosumnes River College station.

== History ==
The first light rail line of the SacRT opened March 12, 1987. Initial service commenced between Watt/I-80 and 8th & O stations only for the first six months. It was extended to Butterfield that same year on September 5. In all, it was an 18.3-mile (29.5 km) route between Watt/I-80 station in North Sacramento, through downtown, and continuing east on Folsom Boulevard to Butterfield Way station. It was built at a cost of $176 million ($499 million adjusted for inflation), which included the cost of vehicles and maintenance and storage facilities. Approximately $94 million of the funds needed for the project had been reallocated from a canceled plan to build a freeway to bypass I-80 Business.

Much of the line, when it was first built, was single-tracked, though improvements over the 1990s allowed much of the original system to be double-tracked. The line was built mainly using portions of the Sacramento Northern Railroad and Sacramento Valley Railroad right-of-ways, coupled with use of structures of an abandoned freeway project. A limited portion of the route runs on streets, mainly in downtown Sacramento.

The line became more popular than anyone anticipated, necessitating further expansions and improvements to the system.

SacRT has proposed extending the light rail system 11.2-mile (18.0 km) south to the town of Elk Grove in phases.

The first phase of the southern extension opened on September 26, 2003, with 6.3 miles (10.1 km) added from 16th Street to Meadowview. The extension added seven new stations to the system and runs parallel to a railroad right of way. The light rail system was reconfigured in June 2005 with the South Line connected to the Watt I-80/Downtown Line and designated as the Blue Line.

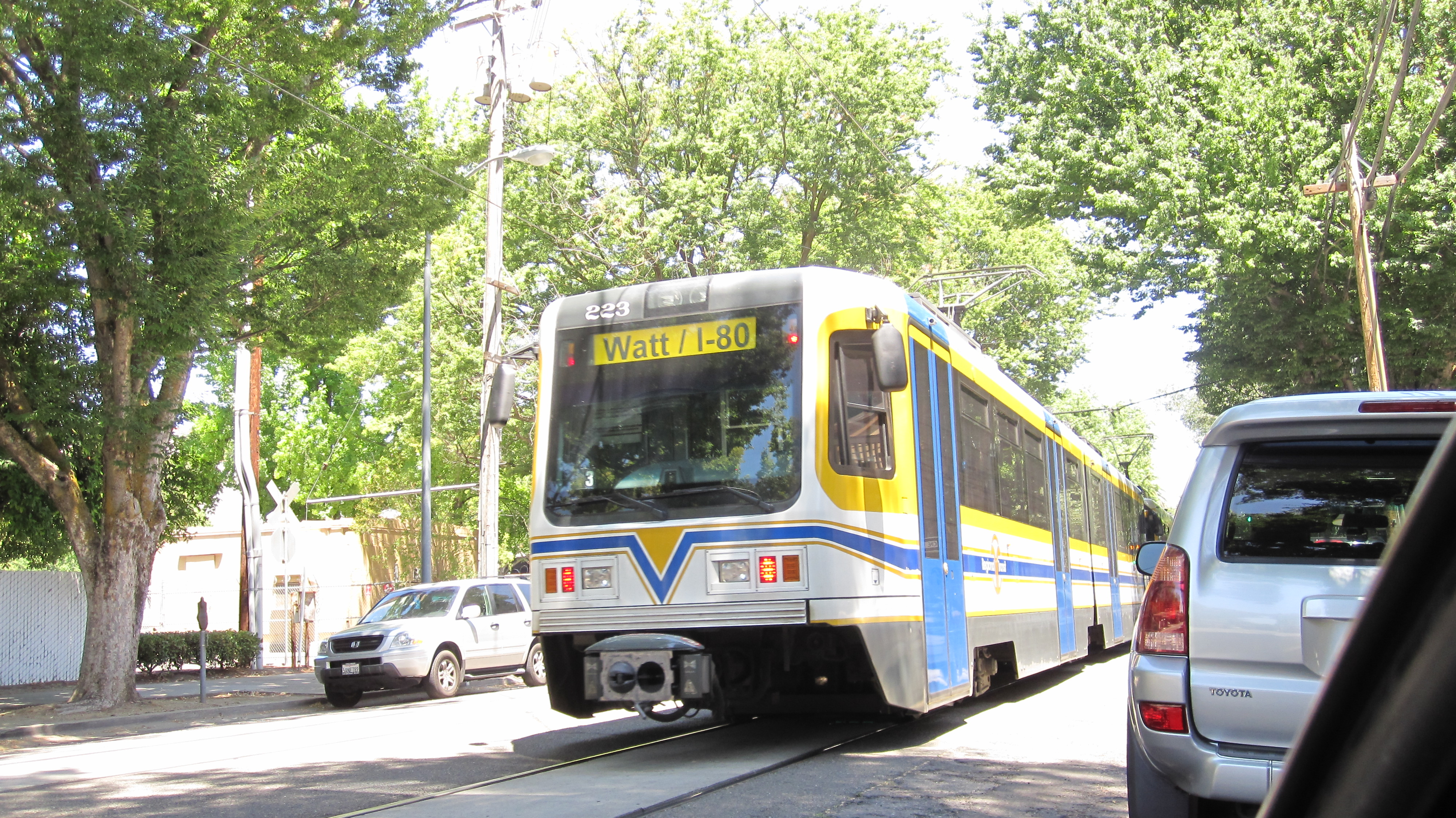
A train bound for Watt/I-80 in Downtown Sacramento, July 2019

The second phase of the southern extension opened more than a decade later on August 24, 2015, with 4.3 miles (6.9 km) added from Meadowview to Consumnes River College. The extension added seven new stations to the system. An additional station, Morrison Creek, was put on hold to open as an infill station until the adjacent land was developed. Eventually in 2021, despite the land around the station remaining undeveloped, Morrison Creek opened to the public as a station only accessible via pedestrian and bike paths. Sacramento RT added a large parking structure at Cosumnes River College to attract riders from southern Sacramento County and boost ridership.

An additional infill station on the line called Dos Rios station opened between the Globe and Alkali Flat/La Valentina stations in the Dos Rios Triangle neighborhood of North Sacramento. The station was part of a new housing development project that is funded by California's cap and trade system, that opened on September 28, 2026.

== Future expansion ==
=== Proposed Elk Grove extension ===
A third planned phase of the southern extension would extend the line from its current southern terminus to Elk Grove about 2 miles along Bruceville Road is on hold indefinitely due to a lack of funding. Land use and station accessibility must be improved to qualify the extension for Federal Transit Administration (FTA) grant funding. Construction on this project was not expected to begin until after 2040. In 2019, the city of Elk Grove prepared a study on improving e-tran Route 110 with bus rapid transit (BRT) characteristics. Route 110 mostly follows a similar alignment to the proposed Blue Line extension. In July 2024, the city of Elk Grove began conducting a feasibility study over whether to continue forward with the Blue Line extension or the BRT, considering five different light rail and BRT alternatives to expand transit to the city. In March 2026, the city released a draft implementation plan that recommended extending the light rail line to Kammerer Road. The city council approved the plan in April 2026.

== Station listing ==
The following table lists the current stations of the Blue Line, from north to south.

Key
†	Closed station
	Request stop

Station	Opened	Transfers
Watt/I-80	March 12, 1987	Sacramento Regional Transit: 1, 15, 26, 84, 93; Placer County Transit: 10; Roseville Transit: Rapid Link
Watt/I-80 West	March 12, 1987	
Roseville Road	March 12, 1987	
Marconi/Arcade	March 12, 1987	Sacramento Regional Transit: 25, 86, 87, SmaRT Ride Natomas-North Sacramento
Swanston	March 12, 1987	
Royal Oaks	March 12, 1987	Sacramento Regional Transit: 13, 23
Arden/Del Paso	March 12, 1987	Sacramento Regional Transit: 13, 15, 19, 23, 88, 113
Globe	March 12, 1987	
Dos Rios	September 28, 2026	
Alkali Flat/La Valentina	March 12, 1987	Sacramento Regional Transit: 33, 129
12th & I	March 12, 1987	Sacramento Regional Transit: 129, E10, E11, E12, E13, E14, E15, E16, E17, E18; Roseville Transit: 1, 2, 3, 4, 5, 6, 7, 8, 9, 10, 11; South County Transit: Galt – Sacramento Commuter Express
Cathedral Square (westbound: 10th & K, eastbound: 11th & K)	March 12, 1987	Sacramento Regional Transit: 30, 38, 62; Yolobus: 37, 43, 43R, 230
St. Rose of Lima Park (eastbound: 9th & K)	March 12, 1987	Sacramento Regional Transit: 30, 38, 62, 86, 88, 142 (Airport Express); Roseville Transit: 1, 2, 3, 4, 5, 6, 7, 8, 9, 10, 11; Yolobus: 42A/B, 43, 43R, 230
St. Rose of Lima Park † (southbound: 7th & K)	March 12, 1987	Closed September 30, 2016
7th & Capitol (southbound); 8th & Capitol (northbound)	March 12, 1987	Gold Green; Sacramento Regional Transit: 11, 30, 38, 51, 62, 86, 88, 102, 103, 106, 107, 109, 129, 134, 142 (Airport Express), E10, E11, E12, E13, E14, E15, E16, E17, E18; Roseville Transit: 1, 2, 3, 4, 5, 6, 7, 8, 9, 10, 11; South County Transit: Galt – Sacramento Commuter Express; Yolobus: 37, 40, 41, 42A/B, 43, 43R, 230, 240
8th & O	March 12, 1987	Gold Green; Sacramento Regional Transit: 11, 51, 102, 103, 106, 107, 109, E10, E11, E12, E13, E14, E15, E16, E17, E18; Yolobus: 42A, 42B, 43, 43R, 230
Archives Plaza	March 12, 1987	Gold Green
13th Street	March 12, 1987	Gold Green
16th Street	September 5, 1987	Gold; Sacramento Regional Transit: 106, 109, E10, E11, E12, E13, E14, E15, E16, E17, E18; South County Transit: Galt – Sacramento Commuter Express
Broadway	September 26, 2003	Sacramento Regional Transit: 51, 62
4th Avenue/Wayne Hultgren	September 26, 2003	Sacramento Regional Transit: 62
City College	September 26, 2003	Sacramento Regional Transit: 11, SmaRT Ride Franklin−South Sacramento
Fruitridge	September 26, 2003	Sacramento Regional Transit: 61, SmaRT Ride Franklin−South Sacramento
47th Avenue	September 26, 2003	Sacramento Regional Transit: SmaRT Ride Franklin−South Sacramento
Florin	September 26, 2003	Sacramento Regional Transit: 81, SmaRT Ride Franklin−South Sacramento
Meadowview	September 26, 2003	Sacramento Regional Transit: 56, 105, SmaRT Ride Franklin−South Sacramento
Morrison Creek	August 29, 2021	
Franklin	August 24, 2015	Sacramento Regional Transit: SmaRT Ride Franklin−South Sacramento
Center Parkway	August 24, 2015	Sacramento Regional Transit: SmaRT Ride Franklin−South Sacramento
Cosumnes River College	August 24, 2015	Sacramento Regional Transit: 56, 67, 68, E110, E114, E115, E116, SmaRT Ride Franklin−South Sacramento; South County Transit: Hwy 99 Express
