= Center Parkway station (Sacramento) =

Sacramento RT light rail station

Center Parkway
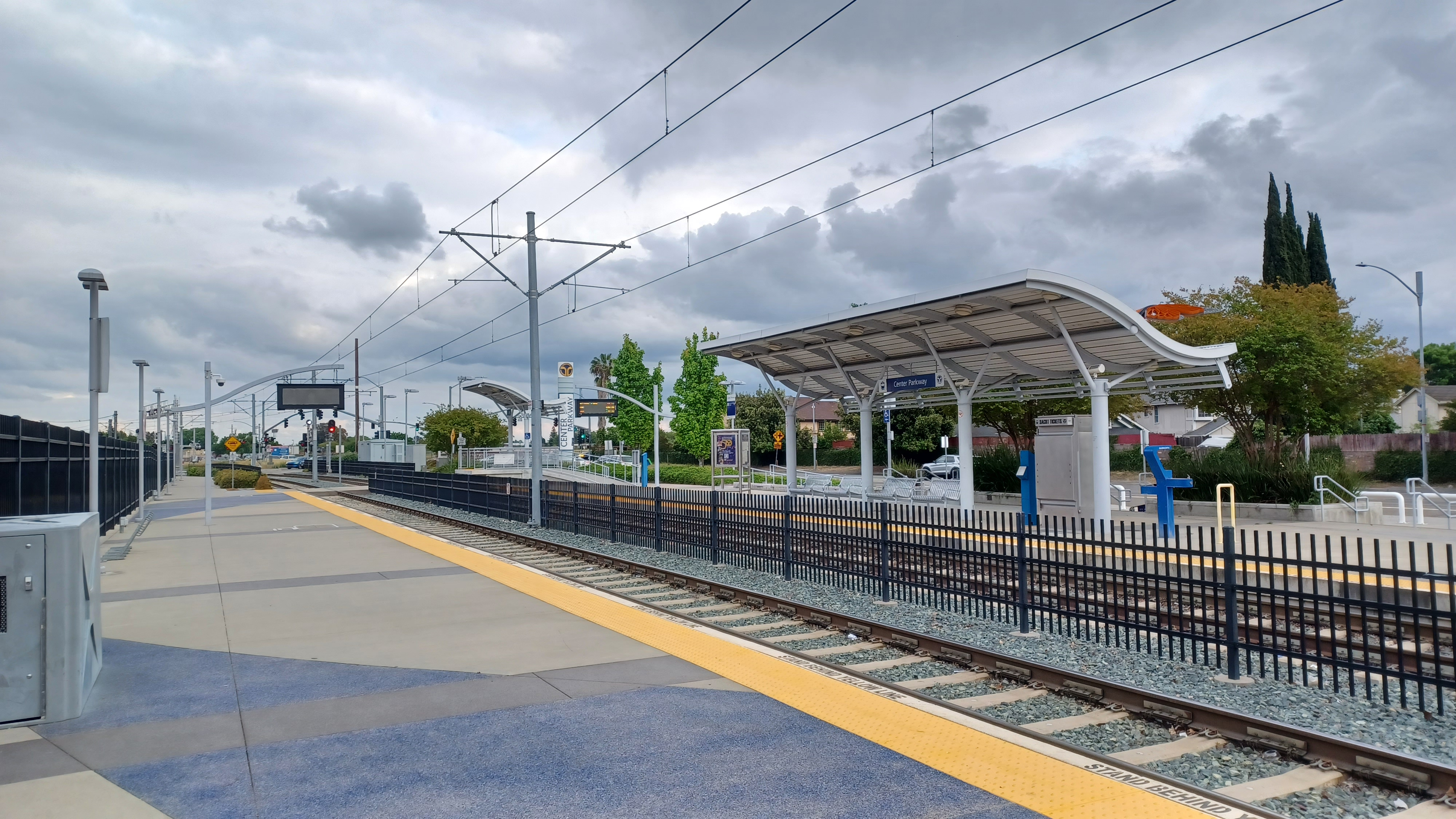
- Station platform in April 2025

General information
- Location: 6349 Cosumnes River Boulevard; Sacramento, California; United States
- Coordinates: 38°27′31.5″N 121°25′47.5″W
- Owner: Sacramento Regional Transit District
- Platforms: 2 side platforms
- Tracks: 2
- Connections: Sacramento Regional Transit: SmaRT Ride Franklin−South Sacramento

Construction
- Structure type: At-grade
- Cycle facilities: Racks, lockers
- Accessible: Yes

History
- Opened: August 24, 2015

Services
Preceding station	SacRT	Following station
Franklin toward Watt/I-80	Blue Line	Cosumnes River College Terminus
Location

Center Parkway station is a side platformed Sacramento RT light rail station in Sacramento, California, United States. The station was opened on August 24, 2015, and is operated by the Sacramento Regional Transit District. It is served by the Blue Line. The station is located on the north side of Cosumnes River Boulevard at Center Parkway, serving the Valley Hi neighborhood and Valley High School in South Sacramento. There is no park and ride lot at the Center Parkway station.
