= SacRT light rail =

Light rail system in Sacramento, California

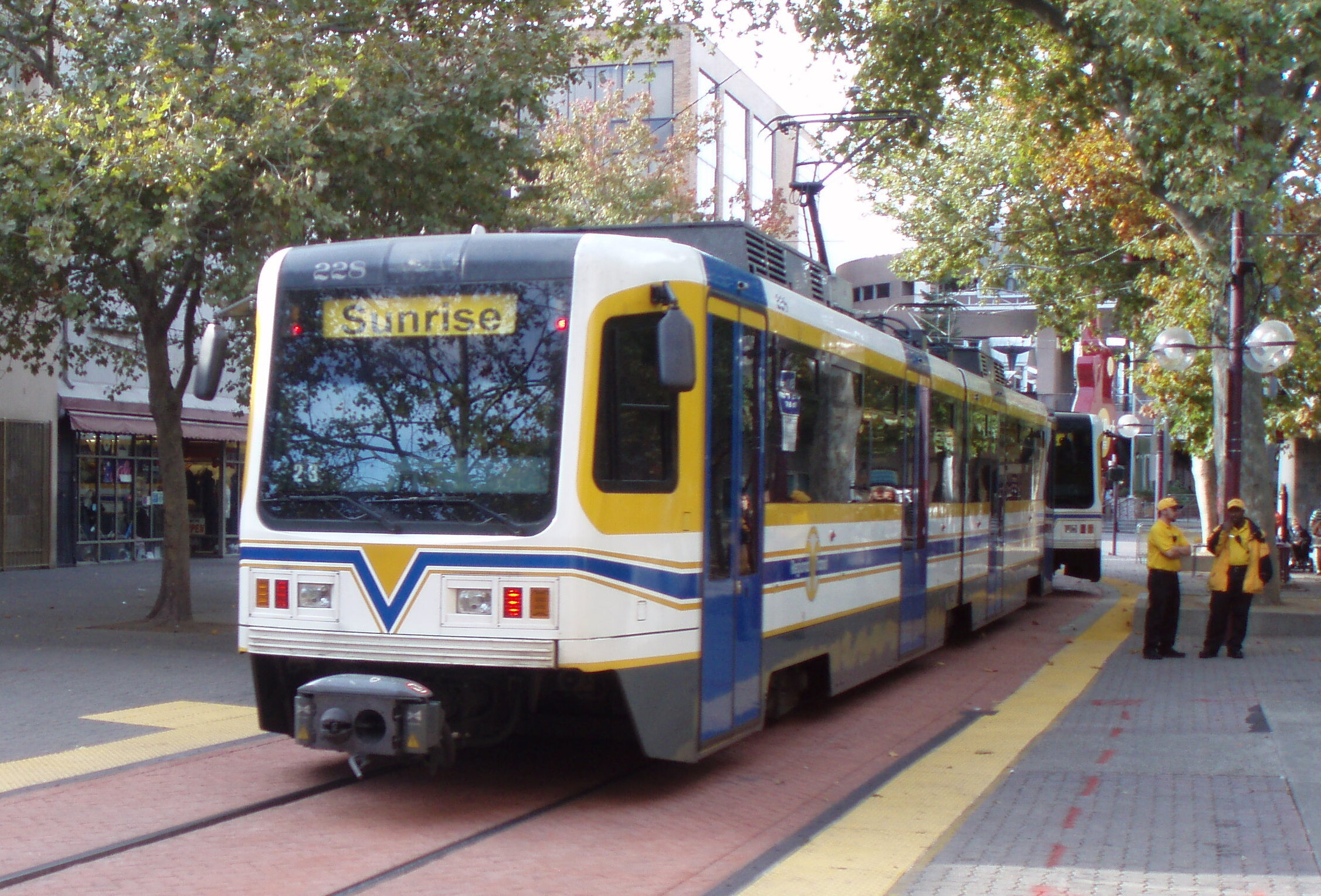
- CAF LRV in downtown Sacramento

Overview
- Owner: Sacramento Regional Transit District
- Locale: Sacramento, California
- Transit type: Light rail
- Number of lines: 3
- Number of stations: 55
- Daily ridership: 22,900 (weekdays, Q2 2026)
- Annual ridership: 7,410,000 (2025)
- Website: sacrt.com

Operation
- Began operation: March 12, 1987; 39 years ago
- Rolling stock: 36 Siemens–Duewag U2a; 40 CAF S/200; 63 Siemens S700
- Train length: 1–2 cars, capable of up to 4 cars
- Headway: 15 min; 30 min (late nights)

Technical
- System length: 42.9 mi (69.0 km)
- Track gauge: 4 ft 8 1/2 in (1,435 mm) standard gauge
- Electrification: Overhead line, 750 V DC
- Top speed: 55 mph (89 km/h)
System map
Key
- All stops are accessible except 12th & I southbound

The SacRT light rail system serves the Sacramento, California area. It is operated by the Sacramento Regional Transit District (SacRT) and has 42.9 miles (69.0 km) of network comprising three main lines on standard gauge tracks, 55 stations, and a fleet of 121 vehicles. With an average of 22,900 weekday daily boardings as of the second quarter of 2026, the SacRT light rail system is the fifteenth busiest in the United States.

== History ==
=== Origins ===
The Sacramento Regional Transit District (also known as simply SacRT) began planning for a light rail system in the mid-1980s, after the successful opening of the San Diego Trolley in 1981 and amid a surge in light rail construction in mid-sized cities nationwide (Buffalo, Denver, Portland, and San Jose also built systems at the same time).

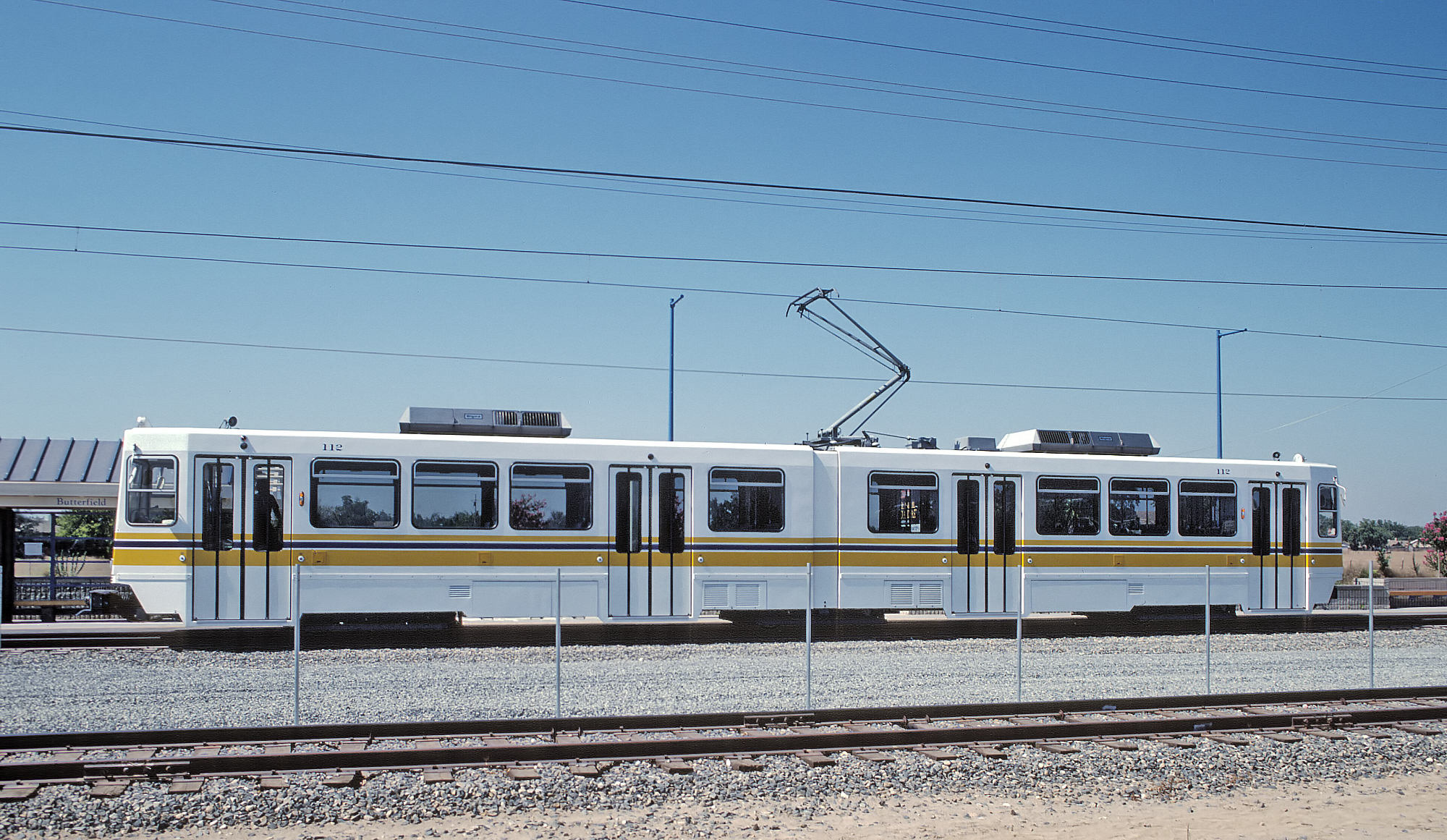
Siemens U2A at Butterfield station, the eastern end of the line, on August 26, 1988.

The first line of the light rail system opened on March 12, 1987. Originally branded as RT Metro, the new line linked the northeastern and eastern corridors which both parallel Interstate 80 and Route 50 respectively with Downtown Sacramento. More specifically, the "starter line" ran between Watt/I-80 and Butterfield stations. The line from Butterfield to the Western Pacific line ran on the former Sacramento Valley Railroad. The right of way between Q and R Streets running from 10th to 17th Streets was a former Western Pacific Railroad branch. The line between downtown and Arden Way employed city streets, then turned on a former Western Pacific spur. At the Southern Pacific right of way, the line turned to parallel it for a few miles before transitioning into the median of Interstate 80.

As light rail ridership increased, RT continued to expand the light rail system. In 1993, two infill stations were added on the existing RT Metro line: 39th Street and 48th Street. In September 1998, the line was extended from Butterfield station to Mather Field/Mills station.

Sometime in the late 1990s, the RT Metro branding quietly fell into disuse. It is now simply known as the SacRT light rail system.

=== Expansion ===
In September 2003, Sacramento Regional Transit opened the first phase of the South Line (now called the Blue Line), which was a 6.3-mile (10.1 km) extension to South Sacramento. In June 2004, the Gold Line extended from the Mather Field/Mills station to Sunrise Boulevard, and on October 15, 2005, a 7.4-mile (11.9 km) extension from the Sunrise station to the city of Folsom was opened.

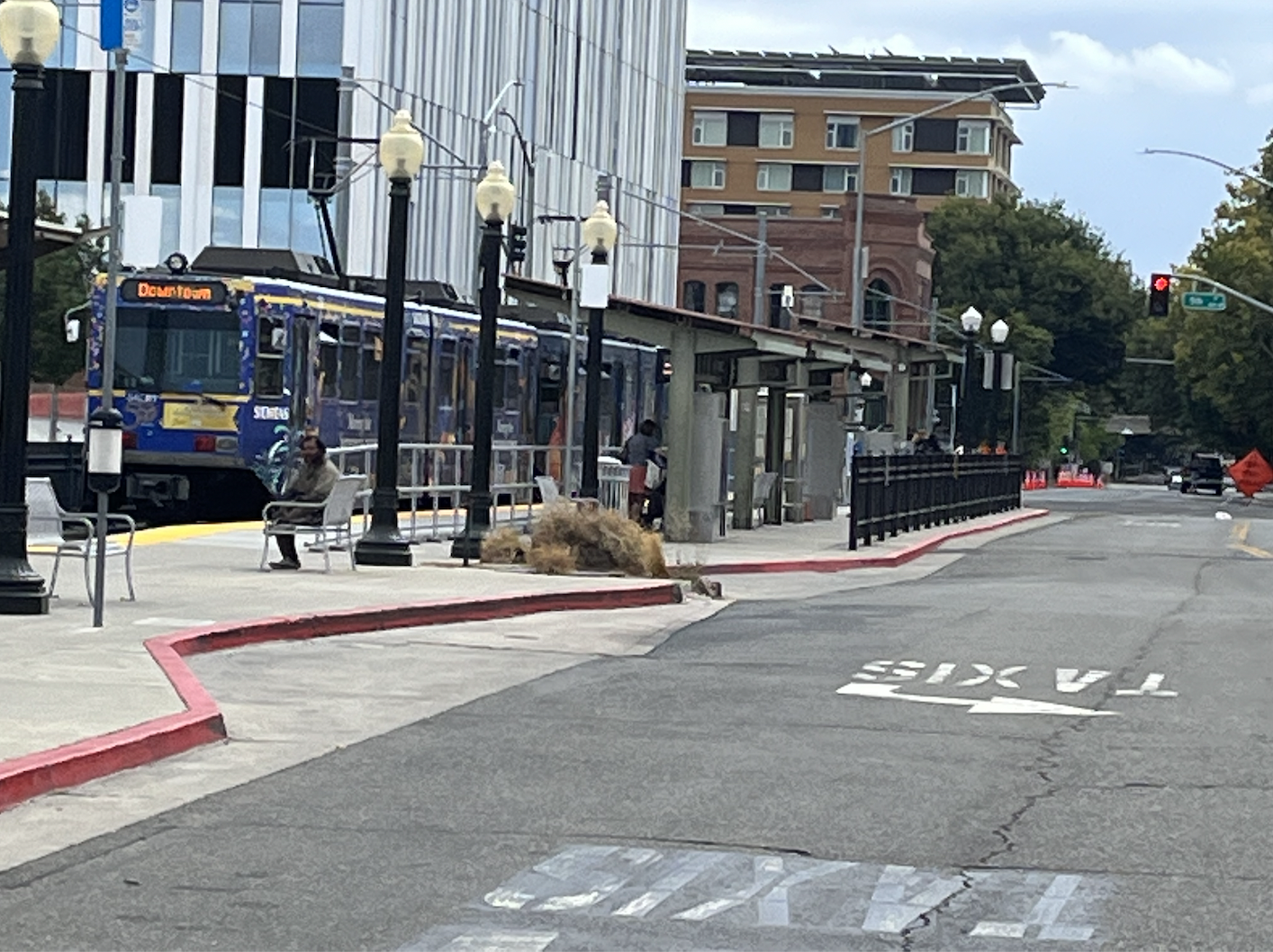
The Sacramento Valley light rail station opened on December 8, 2006.

In December 2006, the final leg of the Amtrak/Folsom project was extended by 0.7-mile (1.1 km), to the downtown Sacramento Valley Station, connecting light rail with Amtrak inter-city and Capitol Corridor services as well as local and commuter buses.

The system continued expanding in the next decade when RT completed the initial phase of the Green Line to 7th & Richards in 2012. The second phase of the line is planned to reach to the Sacramento International Airport. Later in August 2015, RT extended the Blue Line south to Cosumnes River College.

Sacramento RT Light Rail ridership peaked at 16.8 million rides in 2008 but has declined to 9.7 million rides in 2018, a drop of 42% during that period.

== System ==
=== Lines ===
Sacramento's light rail system operates 42.9 miles (69.0 km) of light rail on three rail lines, serving 55 stations. It connects Downtown Sacramento with River District, North Sacramento, South Sacramento, East Sacramento, Rancho Cordova, and Folsom.

Line name	Stations	Termini	
Line name	Stations	Western/Northern	Eastern/Southern
Blue Line	29	Watt/I-80	Cosumnes River College
Gold Line	27	Sacramento Valley	Historic Folsom
Green Line	8	7th & Richards/Township 9	13th Street

=== Hours and frequency ===
Light rail service operates from as early as 4:00 am to as late as midnight. Blue and Gold Line trains operate daily with service every 15 minutes during the day and every 30 minutes during the early morning and late nights. However, Gold Line trains east of Sunrise station operate every 30 minutes all day. Green Line trains only operate on weekdays and run every 30 minutes throughout the day.

=== Stations ===
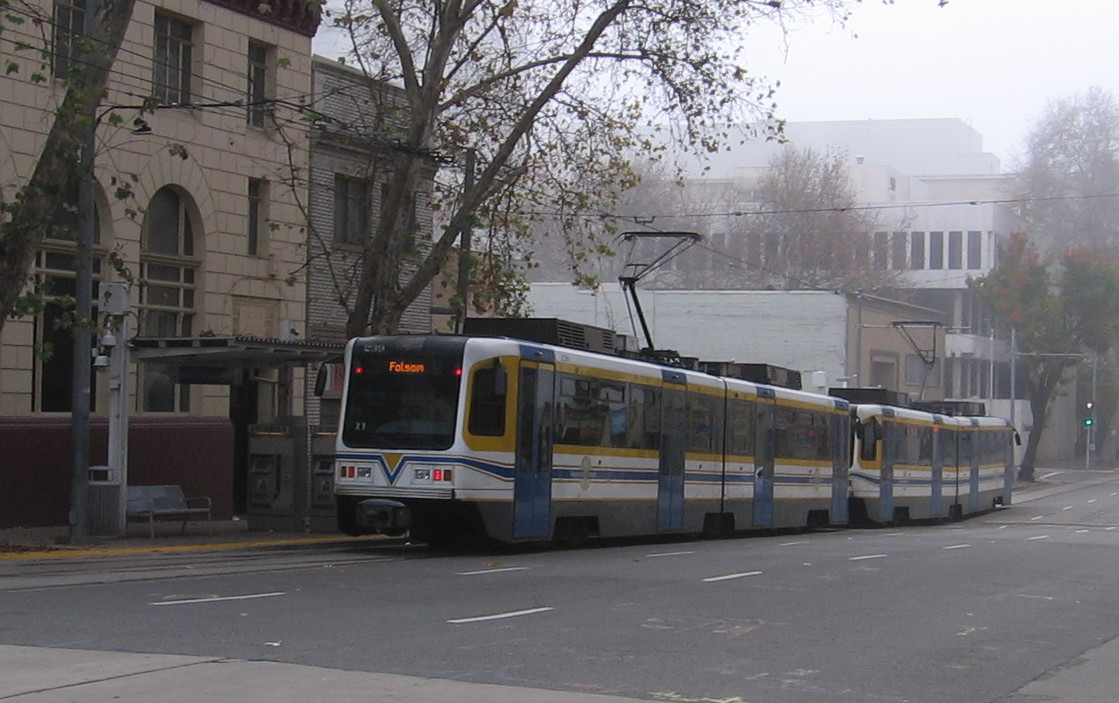
CAF S/200 light rail vehicle at St. Rose of Lima Park station

The 55 stations along the network are open-air structures featuring passenger canopies for protection from adverse weather. Twenty-six stations offer bus transfer services and 22 have park-and-ride lots with a total of 10,113 available parking spaces.

The busiest stations in the system by average daily boardings/alightings are: 16th Street (6,800), University/65th (3,000), Cosumnes River College (2,900), and 29th Street (2,900).

Works of public art included at several stations were developed as part of the RT Public Art Program, and represent an array of media including, mosaics, sculptures, metalwork and murals. Each was commissioned to incorporate an identity and sense of place unique to the neighborhood surrounding the station.

=== Rolling stock ===
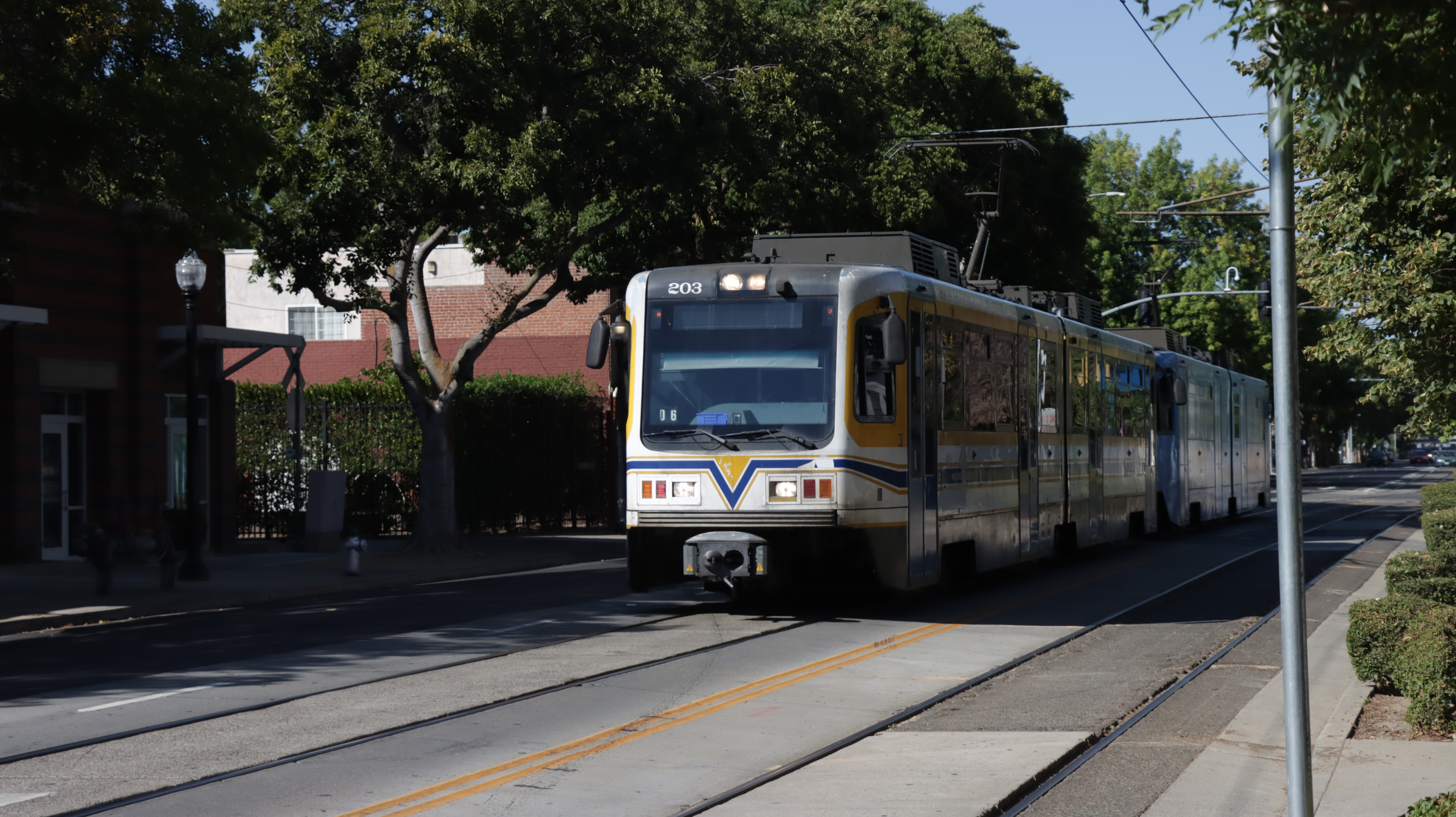
A two car CAF LRV heading south on 12th St. in downtown Sacramento.

The LRV fleet is composed of cars from two different builders: 36 from Siemens–Duewag U2A, some of which have been in use since the RT opened, 40 S/200 units delivered in 2003 from Construcciones y Auxiliar de Ferrocarriles (CAF), and up to 76 Siemens S700 units which began entering service in 2024 that will eventually replace all former Siemens-Duewag / CAF LRVs if funding is secured for the entire contract option. Sacramento RT plans to retire the U2A fleet starting on September 1, 2024, as the fleet of S700s enter service. The agency has ordered 63 S700 LRVs, and has options to purchase up to 76 if additional funding is secured.

Number(s)	Qty	Built	Manufacturer	Model	Notes
35	1	1912	American Car Company	California car	Restored historic electric streetcar, used for special events
101‍–‍126	26	1985‍–‍1986	Siemens–Duewag	U2A	To be withdrawn from operation starting by the summer of 2024
127‍–‍136	10	1990‍–‍1991	Siemens–Duewag	U2A	To be withdrawn from operation starting by the summer of 2024
201‍–‍240	40	2002‍–‍2003	CAF	S/200	
301‍–‍320	20	1985‍–‍1987	UTDC	ALRV	Ex-VTA. Acquired in 2015, retired in 2022.
401‍–‍464	63	2022‍–‍2026+	Siemens	S700	Began service on September 1, 2024.

==== Former rolling stock ====
RT previously operated 20 Urban Transportation Development Corporation (UTDC) ALRV cars. These LRVs were built between 1985 and 1987 for the Santa Clara Valley Transportation Authority (VTA). After being withdrawn from use by VTA, they were purchased by RT and refurbished by Siemens in 2015. In RT service, they carried fleet numbers 301 through 320.

They were withdrawn from use in 2022 as "despite the extensive refurbishment and several ongoing maintenance contracts, the UTDC LRVs have failed to operate consistently in revenue service. By the end of fiscal year 2021, SacRT removed UTDC LRVs from service due to major failures in the propulsion circuit, unavailable replacement parts, reengineering of parts/systems, and inability of cab annunciation system to alert personnel of a serious safety hazard."

== System projects ==
=== Low-floor modernization project ===
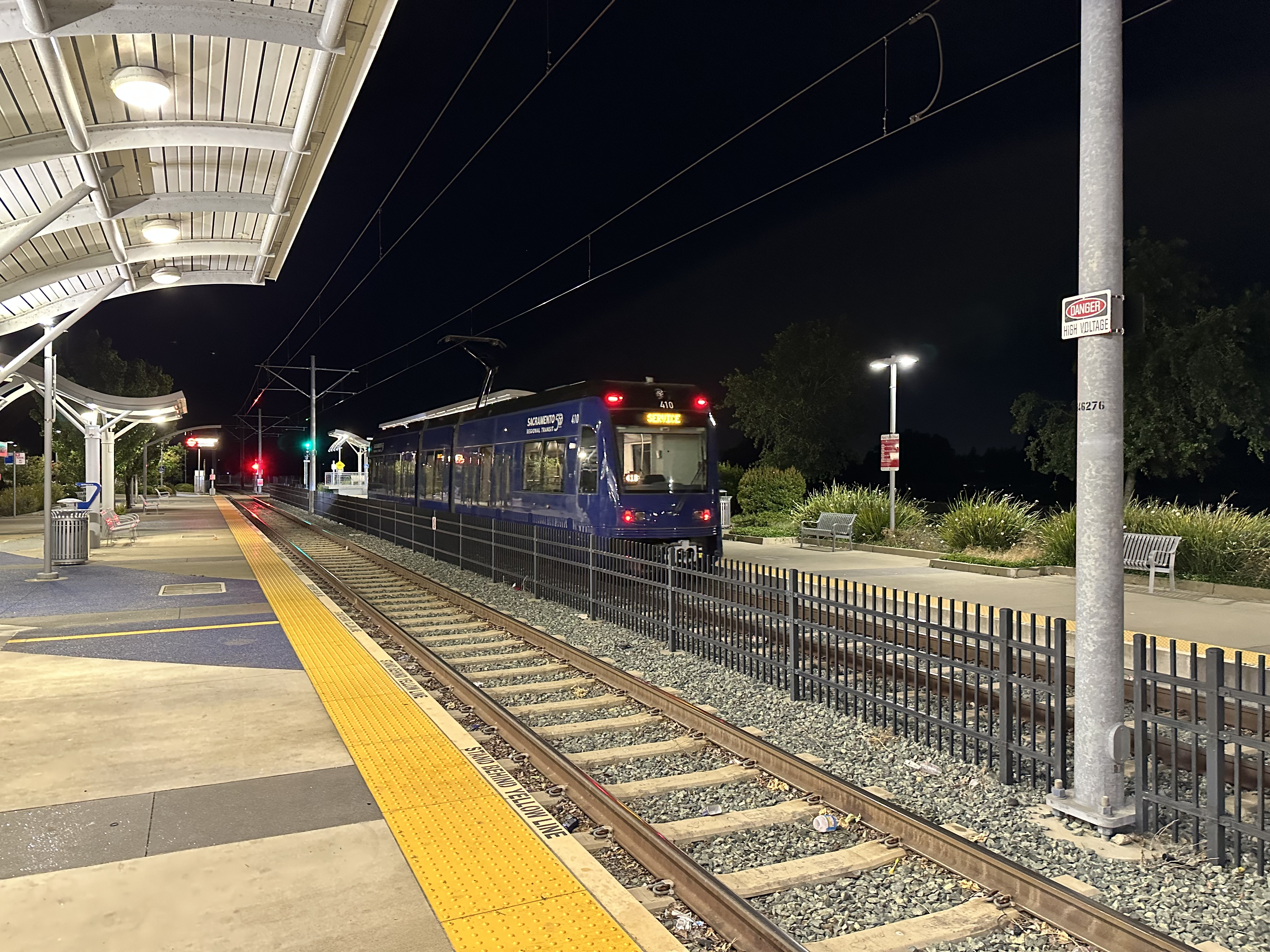
Siemens S700 LRV testing at Franklin station

Sacramento Light Rail system is over 30 years old, and its existing train cars and stations are aging. SacRT began a 5-year modernization project in 2023, including new trains, station platforms, and increased services. The construction work will continue until 2027.

In 2023, RT started purchasing new low-floor Siemens S700 vehicles that allow passengers to directly enter trains at nearly floor level instead of walking up stairs. Those new trains began a rigorous three-step testing process in early 2023 and entered service on September 1, 2024.

As part of the low floor train project, station platforms are being raised to eight inches (20 cm) above the top of the rail to allow a small bridge plate (on the new trains) to be used to load passengers who require it. The five stations constructed after 2006 were already designed for low-floor vehicles and do not require modification. RT raises platforms in two phases, with half (two car lengths) of a platform (generally four car lengths) taken out of service during construction. Gold Line station modification was completed in summer 2024, while Blue Line station modification is ongoing as of April 2026.

One component of the project involved improving service on the Gold Line to four stations in the Folsom area. Prior to 2025, service intervals were limited to 30 minutes between Sunrise and Historic Folsom stations. To increase frequency, a second track was added between Park Shore Drive and Bidwell Street to allow more trains to pass through in both directions, and a second platform was built at Glenn station. Construction began on January 2, 2024 and finished in January 2025, resulting in increased frequency through a hybrid schedule involving a mix of 15 and 30 minute headways.

On October 24, 2025, SacRT announced they received another round of funding for 10 additional S700 LRVs to their existing order of 45 out of the contract option of up to 76 units. In addition, "SacRT is converting 17 of the 19 light rail stations along the Blue Line to accommodate the height requirement of the new low-floor light rail vehicles, making the system more accessible by eliminating the need to climb stairs to board the vehicles. With this funding, SacRT now has enough money to complete the conversion at all stations."

On December 11, 2025, SacRT announced they acquired additional funding for 4 new S700 LRV's, to add to their undisclosed previous order of an additional 4 on top of the previously announced 55, for a total of 63 S700 LRVs ordered out of their option of 76. 2 of these S700s would be dedicated to the future Riverfront Street Car line to West Sacramento if/when that is built.

=== Green Line to Sacramento International Airport ===
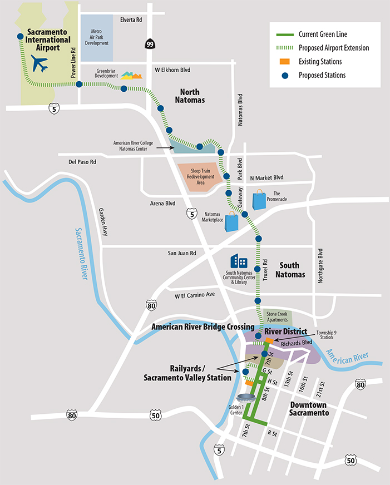
Proposed extension

The Green Line extension to Sacramento International Airport will extend service 12 miles (19 km) to the airport via the Natomas neighborhood. The line would extend northwest from the existing Green Line terminus at the 7th & Richards / Township 9 station. The plan to extend light rail to the airport has been in the works since early 1990s and is the project most requested by residents of the Sacramento region. The agency has completed preparing the draft environmental impact report for the project.

The project, estimated at nearly $1 billion, would be the costliest in RT's history and securing funding has been a challenge. Transportation officials most recently proposed funding the project with a half-cent sales tax increase in Sacramento County, but the measure was narrowly defeated in November 2016.

=== Downtown Riverfront Streetcar ===
While originally under the jurisdiction of a separate agency, RT is also planning the Downtown Riverfront Streetcar project to expand service to West Sacramento. The new streetcar route would run on a short 1.5-mile (2.4 km) segment to West Sacramento across the Tower Bridge. The project, while branded as a streetcar service, would share a portion of the light rail tracks to connect to Sacramento Valley Station and is planned to use the same Siemens S700 vehicles as the light rail service. As of February 2026, the public comment time period has been expanded to the 12th. The initial project timeline estimates construction beginning in the Fall of 2026, with an estimated completion in 2029.
