= Watt/I-80 station =

Light rail station in North Highlands, California

Watt/I-80
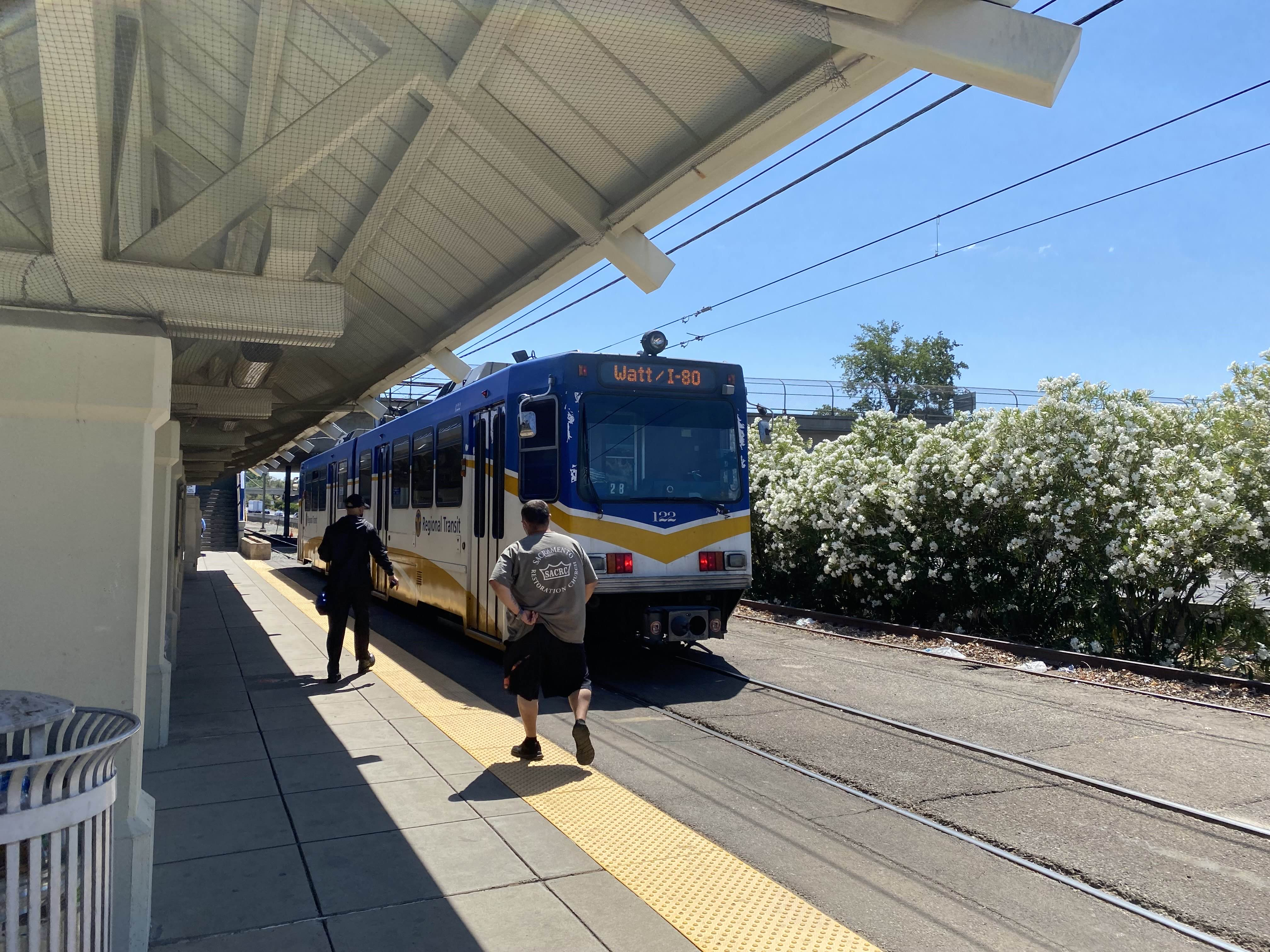
- Watt/I-80 station platform with a one-car train

General information
- Location: Interstate 80 at Watt Avenue; North Highlands, California; United States
- Coordinates: 38°38′43″N 121°22′59″W
- Owner: Sacramento Regional Transit District
- Platforms: 1 side platform
- Tracks: 2
- Connections: Sacramento Regional Transit: 1, 15, 26, 84, 93; Placer County Transit: 10; Roseville Transit: Rapid Link

Construction
- Structure type: Freeway median, below-grade
- Parking: 243 spaces
- Accessible: Yes

History
- Opened: March 12, 1987

Services
Preceding station	SacRT	Following station
Terminus	Blue Line	Watt/I-80 West toward Cosumnes River College
Location

Watt/I-80 station is a below-grade light rail station on the Blue Line of the SacRT light rail system operated by the Sacramento Regional Transit District. The station is located in the median of Interstate 80 at its intersection of Watt Avenue, after which the station is named, in the community of North Highlands, California, United States.

Watt/I-80 station was the original northern terminus of the RT Light Rail system and it remains the northern terminus of today's Blue Line.

The station has experienced problems with broken elevators, inadequate signage, poor cleanliness, and safety. A 2018 study proposed closing the east-side elevator, installing new stairs and elevators on the west side, and relocating many bus transfers to Roseville Road station. The study also proposed closing Watt/I-80 and Watt/I-80 West station, a plan opposed by transit advocates.

SacRT began an improvement project at the Watt/I-80 station in July 2024, coinciding with a Sacramento County project to widen the Watt Avenue bridge. SacRT built two open-air stairwells connecting Watt Avenue to the station and created a bus and pedestrian plaza. Above, the county added bike lanes, improved sidewalks, installed landscaping, and updated traffic signals as part of a complete-streets project for drivers, transit riders, cyclists, and pedestrians.

The station, along with a bus transfer platform and a 243 space park and ride lot, reused a partially built, but later abandoned freeway project.

The park and ride lot is poorly utilized, with an average of just six cars per day in 2018. A study blamed the poor utilization on long walk between the lot and the station, safety concerns at the station, and the Roseville Road station's superior design for passengers arriving by car.

== Platforms and tracks ==
The station includes a park-and-ride and a bus transfer center. It is one of the busiest bus/light rail transfer points in the Sacramento Regional Transit District. It is also the only 2-level light rail station in the system: light rail and a Placer County Transit and Roseville Transit buses use the lower level in the I-80 median, while SacRT bus routes use the Watt Avenue overpass on the upper level.
