= Cosumnes River College station =

Light rail station in Sacramento, California

Cosumnes River College
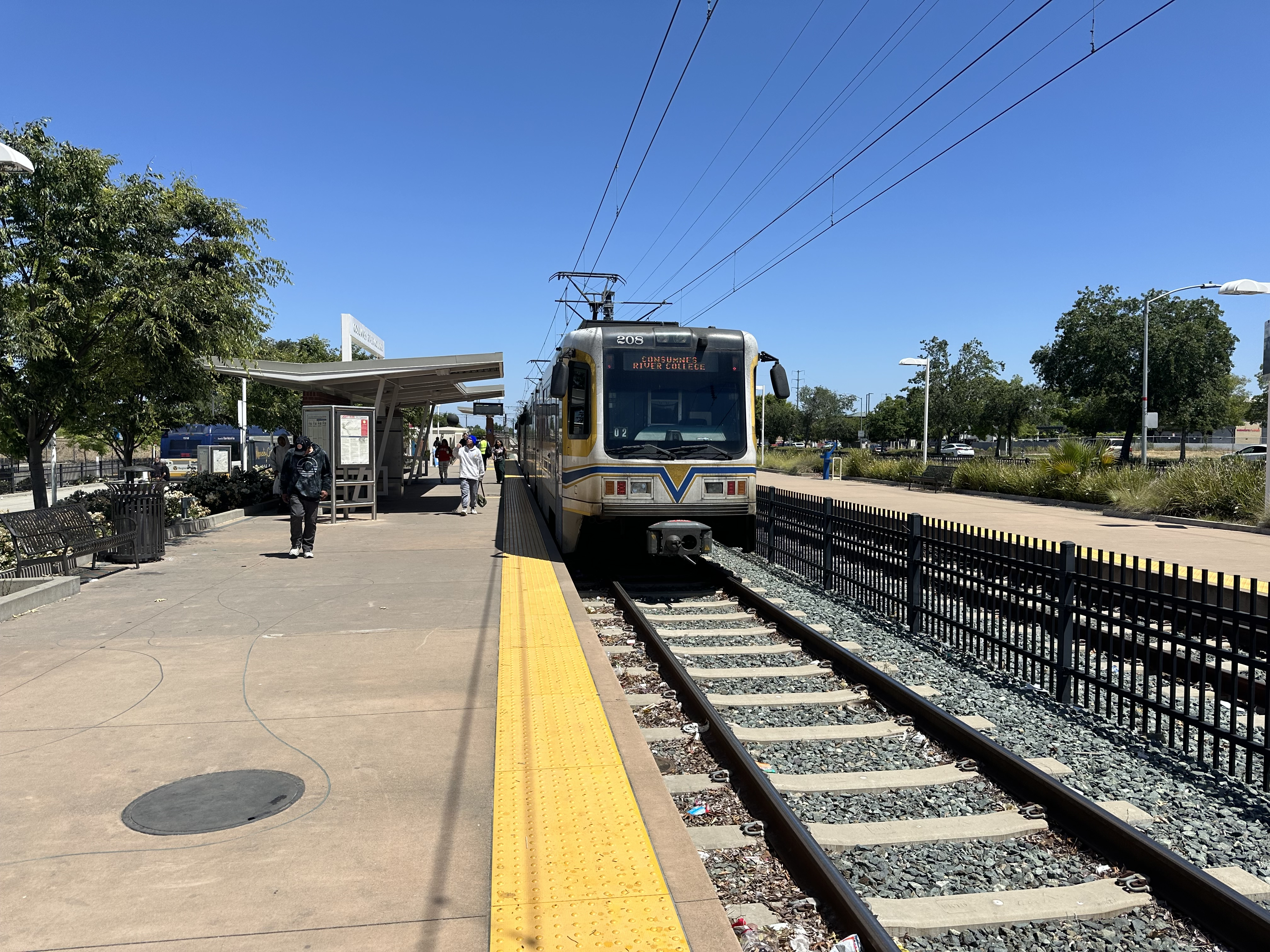
- Cosumnes River College station platforms with Blue Line train waiting to depart northbound, May 2024

General information
- Location: 8370 Bruceville Road; Sacramento, California; United States
- Coordinates: 38°27′13.2″N 121°25′06.0″W
- Owner: Sacramento Regional Transit District
- Platforms: 2 side platforms
- Tracks: 2
- Connections: Sacramento Regional Transit: 56, 67, 68, E110, E114, E115, E116, SmaRT Ride Franklin−South Sacramento

Construction
- Structure type: At-grade
- Parking: 2,016 spaces, paid
- Cycle facilities: Lockers
- Accessible: Yes

History
- Opened: August 24, 2015

Services
Preceding station	SacRT	Following station
Center Parkway toward Watt/I-80	Blue Line	Terminus
Location

Cosumnes River College station is a side platformed Sacramento RT light rail station in Sacramento, California, United States. The station was opened on August 24, 2015, and is operated by the Sacramento Regional Transit District. It serves as the southern terminus of the Blue Line. The station is located on the east side of Cosumnes River College, near the intersection of Bruceville Road and Cosumnes River Boulevard in South Sacramento. It is attached to a 2,016-stall paid parking garage and is served by several bus routes at a dedicated bus station to the west of the platforms.
