= Sacramento Regional Transit District =

Public transit agency in Sacramento, California, United States

Sacramento Regional Transit District (SacRT)
- Founded: April 1, 1973 (53 years ago)
- Headquarters: 1102 Q Street Suite 3000; Sacramento, California
- Locale: Sacramento County, California
- Service type: Transit bus and light rail
- Routes: 81 (bus); 3 (light rail)
- Stops: 3,100 (bus)
- Stations: 55 (light rail)
- Fleet: 198 transit buses (Note: 186 transit buses powered by compressed natural gas, and 12 zero emissions transit buses); 35 shuttle buses (Note: 26 shuttle buses powred by compressed natural gas, and 9 zero emissions shuttle buses); 97 light rail vehicles; 120 paratransit vehicles
- Daily ridership: 57,900 (weekdays, Q2 2026)
- Annual ridership: 17,783,800 (2025)
- Fuel type: CNG, Battery Electric
- Chief executive: Henry Li (General Manager/CEO)
- Website: sacrt.com

The Sacramento Regional Transit District, commonly referred to as SacRT (or simply RT), is the agency responsible for public transportation in the Sacramento, California area. It was established on April 1, 1973, as a result of the acquisition of the Sacramento Transit Authority. In addition to operating over 81 bus routes with connecting bus service in the Sacramento area covering 438 square miles (1,134.4 km^{2}), SacRT also operates a large light rail system, which ranks currently as the sixteenth busiest light rail system in the United States. In 2025, the system had a ridership of 17,783,800, or about 57,900 per weekday as of the second quarter of 2026.

In addition to the city of Sacramento, SacRT serves Sacramento International Airport, much of the northern portion of Sacramento County which includes the incorporated cities of Citrus Heights, Folsom and Rancho Cordova. The unincorporated areas of Sacramento County under the SacRT service area include Arden Arcade, Carmichael, Fair Oaks, Florin, Gold River, North Highlands, Orangevale, Rio Linda and Rosemont. The system formerly provided express bus service between Downtown Sacramento and Elk Grove until the mid-2000s when that city took over bus operations under the newly created e-tran; SacRT now operates e-tran as a contractor to the City of Elk Grove after signing a five-year contract to operate its service in June 2019, replacing MV Transportation. It also provided contracted bus service to neighboring Yolo County (covering West Sacramento, Davis and Woodland); those routes and operations were later taken over by Yolobus after its formation on January 3, 1982. Yolobus have retained the SacRT assigned route numbers for their routes as they continue to service Downtown Sacramento and e-tran has since revised its route numbering scheme when they completed their comprehensive operational analysis in 2018.

== Services ==
=== Transit bus ===
The SacRT system operates 76 bus routes, as of 2024, providing weekday service between 5:00 a.m. and 11:00 p.m. , and ending much earlier on weekends. Frequencies range between every 15 and 90 minutes (ridership dependent; some express buses run only a few times a day). There have been proposals in the past to expand the service hours to late nights to accommodate passengers, businesses and communities, but have been slow to implement these ideas. The most recent changes were announced in August 2012, with plans to improve and expand bus services system-wide by 2017. Since light rail operation commenced in the 1980’s, buses have generally acted as feeders to light rail routes.

The previous Sacramento Regional Transit logo.

==== Airport Express ====
SacRT has a dedicated line (Route 142) between downtown Sacramento and Sacramento International Airport running every hour. This route uses battery electric buses.

==== Causeway Connection ====
SacRT provides a connection between UC Davis in Davis and the UC Davis Medical Center in Sacramento using battery electric buses provided by Electrify America. The buses also provide Free Wi-Fi and USB charging for riders.

=== Present fleet ===
As of 2026, SacRT’s bus fleet consists of the following:

- Gillig BRT Plus CNG 40’
- Gillig Low Floor EV 40’
- OBI Orion VII CNG
- OBI Orion VII NG CNG
- Proterra Catalyst BE40

=== Light rail ===
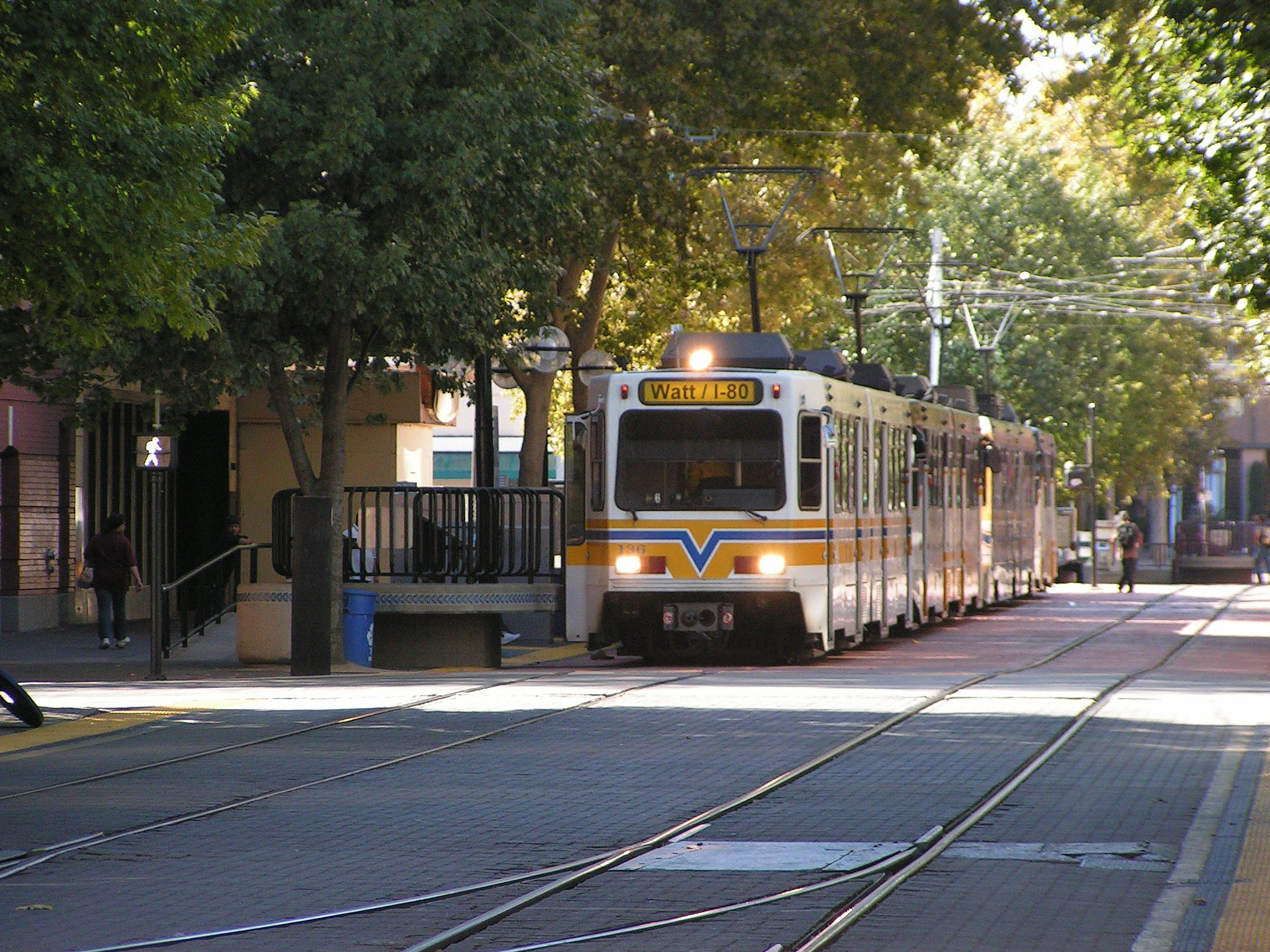
Light rail stop at K Street Mall, Downtown Sacramento.

The SacRT light rail system is a 42.9 miles (69.0 km) system, consisting of three rail lines, 55 stations, and 97 vehicles. Service operates daily from 4:30 am to midnight on weekdays (10:30 pm on weekends).

=== Paratransit (SacRT GO) ===
To meet the requirements of the 1990 Americans with Disabilities Act, the RT established a Paratransit service in 1993, which is a door-to-door service for the disabled.

=== Shuttle Service (SacRT SmaRT Ride) ===
SacRT provided a shuttle service through a smartphone app that allowed people to either be picked up or dropped off at a specified address (curb-to-curb) or at a virtual bus stop (corner-to-corner), depending on the region serviced. The shuttle could also be requested online or over the phone; this service was available throughout most of Sacramento County.

SacRT announced in November 2024 that the SmaRT Ride service would be replaced by SacRT Flex, and would end on 31 December, 2024.

=== SacRT Flex ===
Starting in January 2025, SacRT Flex will replace SacRT's SmaRT Ride service to provide "corner-to-corner" shared-ride sharing to low income, disabled or senior persons in the same regions SmaRT Ride operated in.

=== The Neighborhood Ride ===
In 2006, RT created a new division internally known as "Community Bus Service". Known to the ridership as "The Neighborhood Ride"

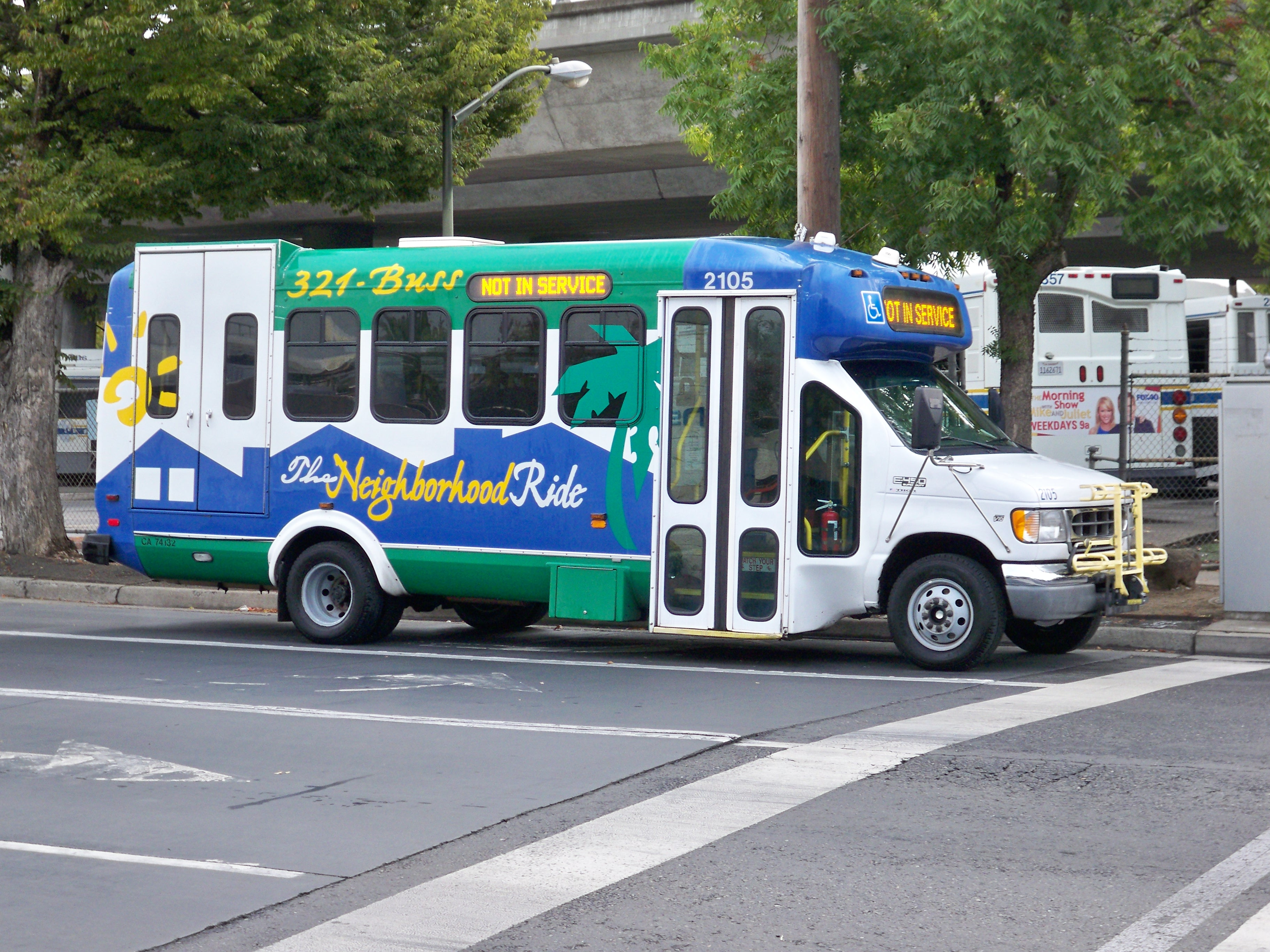
The Neighborhood Ride

- The Neighborhood Ride shuttles are smaller buses (approximately 35 feet (11 m) or less in length) that offer residents greater mobility and new transit options on local intra-community trips.
- The Neighborhood Ride shuttles have regular, pre-designated, pre-scheduled routes, but offer special curb-to-curb service (not to be confused with ADA/paratransit door-to-door service). The shuttles are able to "deviate" travel off route up to ¾ of a mile to pick up and drop off seniors, age 62 and older, and disabled passengers who have a valid ADA/paratransit pass
- Passengers pay only $2.75 per trip ($1.35 for passengers paying a discount fare). RT monthly passes, daily passes, and transfers are also accepted. Passengers with valid ADA/paratransit passes ride free.
- All passengers (except for Lifetime Pass holders), including those with valid ADA/paratransit passes, must pay an additional $1.10 for a route deviation.
- Marked bus stops are located along the route and printed schedules are available at several locations around Sacramento and on Regional Transit's Web site.
- Each shuttle can transport 12-17 passengers and up to two wheelchairs.

== Accidents and incidents ==
On April 9, 2010, at about 10:20 a.m. a Blue Line train struck a vehicle at 47th Ave crossing. The vehicle, a green Honda Accord was dragged about 100 feet (30 m). Inside the vehicle was a woman about the age of 40, She was pronounced dead at U.C. Davis Medical Center. The cause was revealed to be the woman who drove her car around the crossing gates which were down.

A man was hospitalized on April 26, 2010, after he was hit by a light rail while talking on a cell phone. The crash happened near the Iron Point Station in Folsom at about 10 a.m. Investigators said the pedestrian was walking on the tracks and not paying attention to what was coming toward him. The pedestrian on the tracks never looked up at all throughout the entire incident. The operator told investigators that he had spoken to the injured person, and the guy said that he was walking on the tracks because he didn't want to be walking on the roadway while talking on his cell phone. The pedestrian was in serious condition at UC Davis Medical Center. Passengers on the train had an hour delay.

Deputies were called shortly after 9 a.m. on April 27, 2010, to the Zinfandel station. Sheriff's Sgt. Tim Curran said one person shot the victim in the leg and then fled. Investigators said a fight broke out on a light-rail train, culminating in a shooting once the train reached the station platform. The alleged shooter was seen running across the parking lot outside a nearby Ross store, Curran said. The victim was expected to survive, authorities said. RT service did not appear to be affected.

On November 11, 2010, a pick-up truck ran into the side of a moving Regional Transit Light Rail Train at 10:15 a.m. at Starfire Drive and Folsom Boulevard in Sacramento County. The train was only scratched in the collision. Only one passenger received medical attention for minor injuries; the two people in the truck were not hurt.

A Siemens light rail vehicle on a Gold Line train caught fire and started to smoke on December 23, 2010, at approximately 7:30 p.m. near the College Greens station. A communications issue between the Sacramento Fire Department and the Regional Transit light rail operator occurred when the train began to move from the station where the fire was being doused to the Watt/Manlove station over a mile away. The fire caused service disruptions to Gold Line trains traveling in both directions for up to an hour. The car (#136) was towed out of service to the Regional Transit maintenance facility on Academy Way. The fire was likely caused by an overheated generator and battery located on the bottom of the train.

On January 28, 2012, three people died after their vehicle collided with a light-rail train. The accident took place at the crossing near the intersection of 25th Street and 26th Avenue just before 4:45 p.m, when a black Pathfinder SUV was hit by a southbound Blue Line train. The gate arms were determined to be functioning properly. All three fatalities were occupants of the vehicle. At least 17 injured victims were taken to the hospital for treatment.

On August 22, 2019, an LRV rear-ended a Maintenance Vehicle injuring 24. 13 of the injured individuals were taken to 2 local trauma centers.

On February 14, 2022; an LRV was struck by a vehicle attempting to turn onto J Street. The incident took place just before Cathedral Square station. No injuries were reported.

On April 8, 2022, an LRV derailed at the intersection of 8th and K street. There were no injuries reported, but catenary power in downtown Sacramento had to be shut down during the re-railing process, causing major service disruption.

== See also ==
- List of rapid transit systems
- Light rail in North America
- Light rail
- Roseville Transit
- Placer County Transit
- Transportation in the Sacramento metropolitan area
