= K Street (Sacramento) =

Street in Sacramento, California, United States

Coordinates: 38.573°N 121.472°W

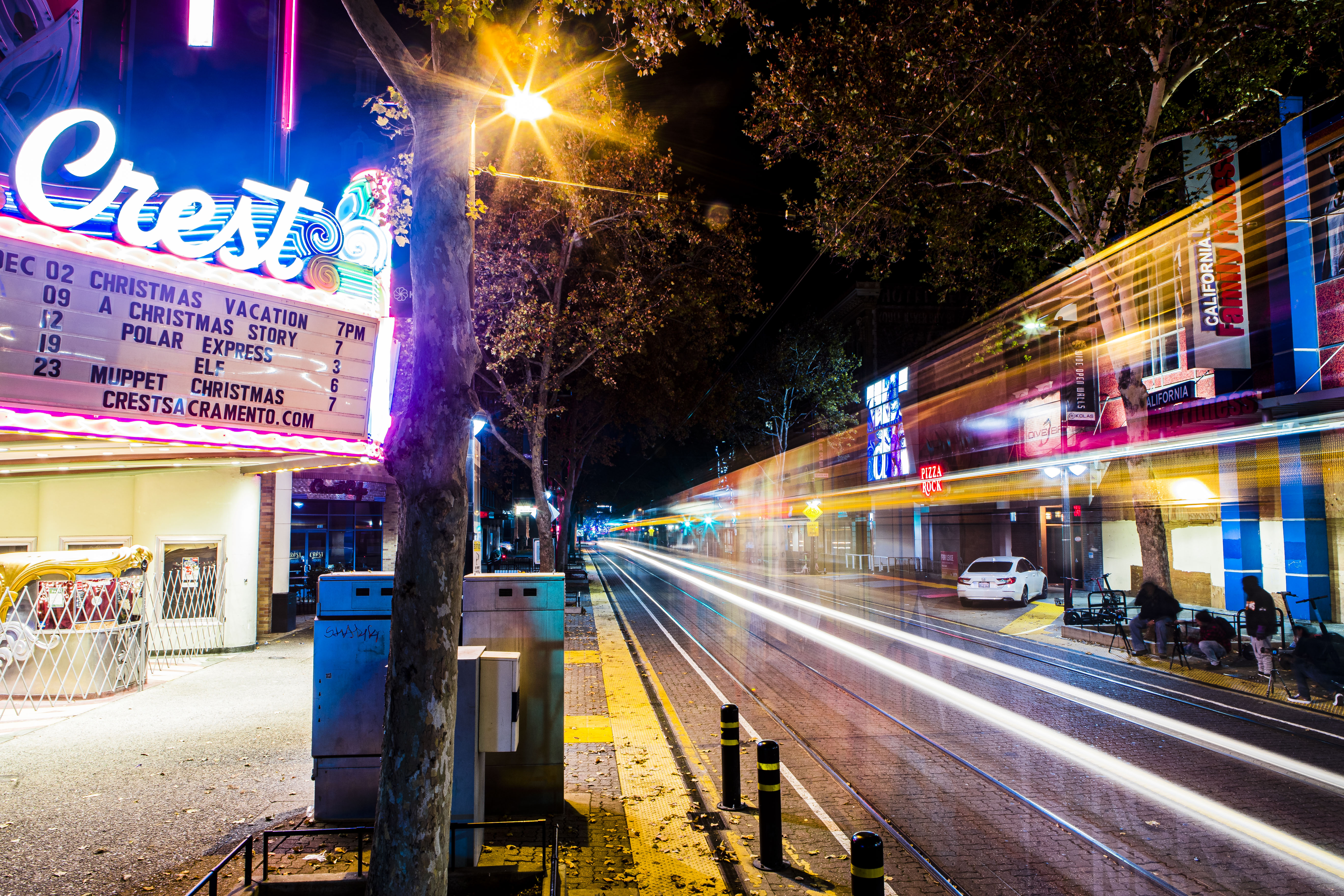
K Street in between 10th and 11th Streets, looking southeast

K Street is a historic street in Sacramento, California, United States. It spans from Old Sacramento, through Downtown Sacramento and Midtown Sacramento, ending in East Sacramento. Other discontinuous segments of K Street in East Sacramento are small residential streets, with the final segment ultimately ending at 54th Street. K Street is known primarily as a shopping, dining and entertainment destination for Downtown, Midtown, and Old Sac.

== History ==
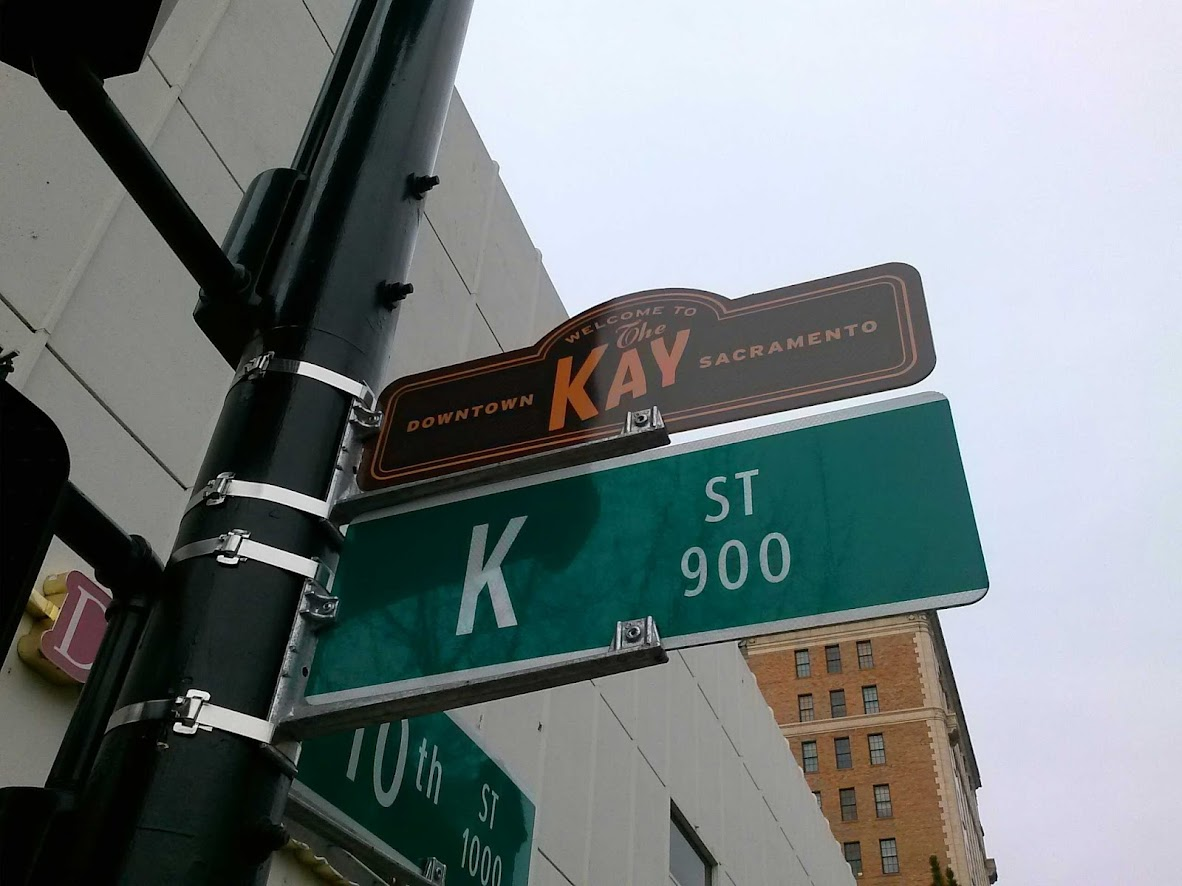
Sign depicting the rebranding of the area to "The Kay"

The path of the street roughly (but not exactly) follows the line from Old Sacramento to Sutter's Fort, which existed as a trail before Sacramento was founded. K Street was once a continuous street for automobile traffic in the mid-20th century during its heyday as a major shopping destination. Department and other large stores that once lined K Street included Breuner's, Weinstock's, Hale's, S. H. Kress & Co., Roos/Atkins, Montgomery Ward and Sears. Movie theaters included the Crest, the Senator, the Hippodrome and, nearby, the Alhambra. In 1969, K Street in downtown Sacramento was closed to all automobile traffic permanently, as it was converted into a pedestrian mall that evolved into the modern K Street Mall. In 1987, Sacramento Regional Transit opened their light rail system, with tracks running on K Street between 7th and 12th Streets. On November 12, 2011, K Street between 8th and 12th Streets was opened to automobile traffic for the first time in 42 years. In November 2012, the K Street Mall was rebranded "The Kay", and now functions as a shopping area. In May 2014, the Sacramento city council approved a public subsidy deal to build a downtown arena. The re-use of the failing Downtown Plaza shopping mall was seen as a possible catalyst to bring revenue and people to Downtown. Today, much of K Street is undergoing re-development, with many businesses still active.

Landmarks along K Street include:

- Downtown Commons including a Macy's department store and the Golden 1 Center, home of the NBA's Sacramento Kings. It sits on the former site of the Downtown Plaza and the section between 4th and 5th Streets is in the stages of redevelopment.
- 701 K: St. Rose of Lima Park
- 726 K: Former Tower Records
- 801 K: Renaissance Tower (1989)
- 818 K: Kress Office Building (1931)
- 900 K: River City Bank
- 9th & K: Former Hale's, then Weinstock's department store
- 1013 K: The Crest Theatre (1949)
- 1019 K: Cathedral of the Blessed Sacrament
- 1029 K: Mohr and Yoerk Market
- 1201 K: 1201 K Tower (the “Ban Roll-On” building, 1992)
- 1211 K: Esquire Imax Theatre (1940)
- 1215 K: Esquire Plaza Building
- Former Alhambra Theatre, directly at the eastern terminus of K Street at 1025 Thirty-First Street (now Alhambra Boulevard). A Safeway grocery store now sits on the old theater’s site.

== Public transportation ==
The Blue Line of the SacRT light rail runs along five blocks of K Street between 7th and 12th Streets. It shares right-of-way with auto traffic except for the block between 7th and 8th Streets, which is still closed to auto traffic. The 9th & K northbound platform of the St. Rose of Lima Park (along with the now-closed 7th & K platform) and Cathedral Square light rail stations serve the corridor.

== See also ==
- 2022 Sacramento shooting, which occurred on K Street
