= East Sacramento, Sacramento, California =

East Sacramento
- Neighborhood of Sacramento
- Nickname: East Sac
- Location within Sacramento
- Coordinates: 38.57°N 121.45°W
- Country: United States
- State: California
- County: Sacramento
- City: Sacramento

East Sacramento (also known as East Sac) is a neighborhood in Sacramento, California, United States, that is east of downtown and midtown. East Sacramento is bounded by U.S. Route 50 to the south, Business Loop 80 to the west and north, Elvas Avenue to the northeast and east, and California State University, Sacramento and the American River to the southeast. East Sacramento residential development began in the 1890s, and the area was annexed into Sacramento in 1911. East Sacramento was also home to the Alhambra Theatre. East Sacramento also includes McKinley Park and the "Fabulous Forties" neighborhood.

== McKinley Park ==
McKinley Park is a major 32-acre (130,000 m^{2}) park located in East Sacramento. The park is bordered to the north by McKinley Boulevard, to the south by H Street, by Alhambra Boulevard to the West and 33rd Street to the East. There is also a smaller, adjacent park located across 33rd Street. A branch of the Sacramento Public Library is located in the north wing of the Clunie Clubhouse, a community center located at the park. The library which serves East Sacramento, Midtown, and River Park has 45,000 volumes. There is also a small lake and 8 tennis courts. The smaller park includes the Shepard Garden and Arts Center. The park is a popular place for runners and walkers.

== Fabulous Forties ==
The Fab Forties neighborhood is part of the East Sacramento district. President Ronald Reagan lived at 1341 45th Street while serving most of his term as Governor of California. The "Fab '40s" is the historic terminus of a once extensive streetcar network that covered nearly all the historic neighborhoods of the city. Forty-sixth street at J Street was the turnaround point for the J Street Line making it one of the widest streets in East Sacramento. The lots between 38th and 47th Streets and bordered by J Street and Folsom Boulevard are among the largest in East Sacramento, creating the concentration of larger houses that gave rise to the area's name. Up until the Great Depression, the grand homes of the "Fab '40s" were considered to be the modern-day equivalent of a suburban mansion. Now, they are considered architecturally spectacular large to mid-sized houses in a very pricey location. Additionally, the demand for larger and more modern housing has created an interesting surge in the number of remodels and multi-story additions throughout the McKinley Park and East Sacramento community. The Fab Forties neighborhood is home to a deodar cedar tree (cedrus deodara) that is over 100 years old. The neighborhood is also one of the most popular Sacramento spots to view Christmas lights, owing to the walkable streets and large, ornate homes.

== Demographics ==
East Sacramento is somewhat diverse. The neighborhood is 74% White, 10% Hispanic, 5% Asian, 5% Black, another 6% is Mixed or Other.

The area is historically a predominantly Irish-American neighborhood in the area near Sacred Heart Parish, and Italian-American in the neighborhood near St. Mary Parish.

== Famous residents ==
- Biba Caggiano - cookbook author and restaurateur
- Kevin Johnson - former mayor of Sacramento, former National Basketball Association player
- Jim Kozimor - announcer for San Jose Earthquakes, former Sacramento Kings announcer
- Lloyd Levine - former assemblymember from Van Nuys and permanent Sacramento resident
- Carol Liu - California state senator from La Cañada Flintridge
- Robert S. Nelsen - former president of Sacramento State University
- Nancy Reagan - wife of former U.S. President and California Governor Ronald Reagan
- Ronald Reagan - former president of the United States, former governor of California, actor
- Michelle Rhee-Johnson - former DC chancellor of schools
- Urijah Faber - UFC mixed martial arts champion and Hall of Famer

== Political representation ==
- Sacramento City Council: Phil Pluckebaum
- Sacramento County Board of Supervisors: Phil Serna
- Assemblymember: Maggy Krell
- State senator: Angelique Ashby
- United States representative: Doris Matsui

== East Sacramento landmarks ==
- Alhambra Bowl - historic bowling alley (1942-1982) located at 1229 Alhambra Boulevard
- Alhambra Theatre - historic theater (1927-1973) that was located on Alhambra Boulevard until it was razed to build a Safeway store
- Chevra Kaddisha Cemetery - first Jewish cemetery in California
- Libby, McNeill and Libby Cannery - historic cannery located at 1724 Stockton Blvd Boulevard
- McKinley Park - historic park in East Sacramento
- New Helvetia Cemetery - oldest cemetery in Sacramento, now site of Miwok Middle School
- Smith's Pomological Gardens and Nursery - historic gardens that were famous throughout California as a botanical wonder
- SMUD Headquarters Building - a public electric utility that serves all of Sacramento County and a small portion of Placer County, headquartered at 6201 S Street
