= K Street =

K Street may refer to:

- K Street (Sacramento), a street in Sacramento, California, United States
- K Street (TV series), a 2003 HBO television series about lobbyists
- K Street (Washington, D.C.), a street in Washington, D.C., United States
- Lobbying industry in the United States, metonymically, as many lobbyists have traditionally had offices on the Washington, D.C., street
