= Marion Biggs =

American politician (1823–1910)

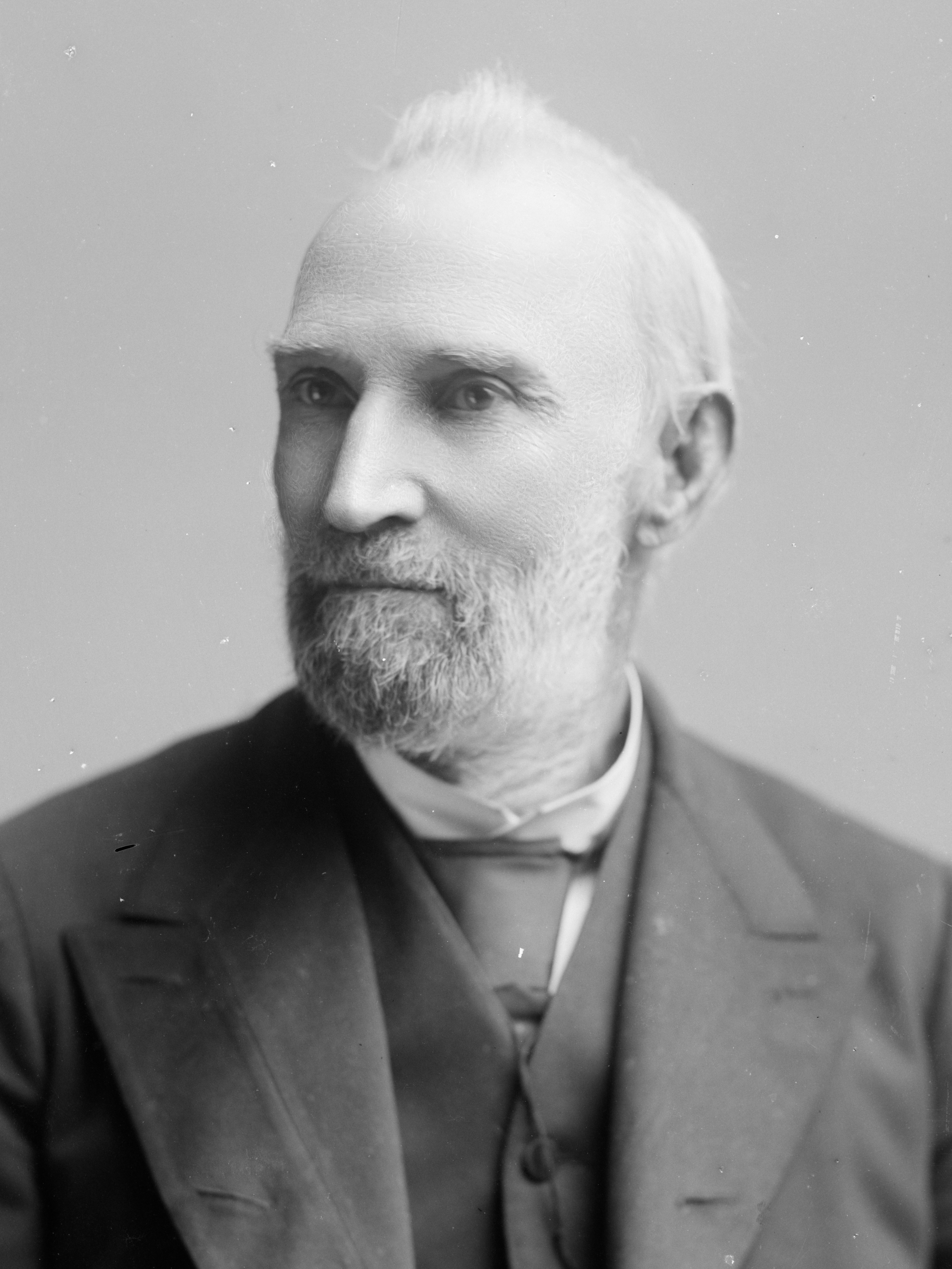

Member of the U.S. House of Representatives from California's 2nd district
- In office March 4, 1887 – March 3, 1891
- Preceded by: James A. Louttit
- Succeeded by: Anthony Caminetti

Delegate to the Second Constitutional Convention of California
- In office September 28, 1878 – March 3, 1879
- Preceded by: Office established
- Succeeded by: Office abolished
- Constituency: 3rd congressional district

Personal details
- Born: May 2, 1823 Pike County, Missouri, U.S.
- Died: August 2, 1910 (aged 87) Gridley, California, U.S.
- Resting place: Sacramento Historic City Cemetery; Sacramento, California, U.S.
- Party: Democratic
- Spouse: Ann Hawkins (m. 1842)
- Children: 11

Marion Biggs (May 2, 1823 – August 2, 1910) was an American slave owner and politician who served two terms as a United States representative from California from 1887 to 1891.

== Early life ==
Marion Biggs was born on May 2, 1823, near Curryville, Pike County, Missouri. He was of Welsh and Scottish descent. Biggs was born one of twelve children to William Biggs and his wife. He attended schools in Missouri.

== Personal life ==
Biggs married Ann Hawkins of Kentucky in 1842. Together, they had eleven children.

He was close friends with Thomas Hart Benton, a Missouri politician.

== Career ==
Biggs moved to California in 1850. He engaged in the business of buying and selling mules and horses. He formed a business partnership with H. J. Glenn and S. E. Wilson. Biggs returned to Missouri with his family.

In 1844, Biggs attended the 1844 Whig National Convention as a Missouri delegate. He then served as the sheriff of Monroe County from 1852 through 1856. He returned to California in 1864. In 1868, the firm of Biggs, Glenn and Wilson dissolved.

Biggs was elected to the California State Assembly from Sacramento County in 1867 and from Butte County in 1869. He was elected to the State constitutional convention from the state at large in 1878.

=== Congress ===
He was elected as a Democrat to the Fiftieth and Fifty-first Congresses (March 4, 1887 – March 3, 1891). He was not a candidate for re-election in 1890.

=== Later career ===
He was a commissioner to attend the centennial celebration of the inauguration of George Washington as President of the United States in 1889.

== Death ==
Biggs resided in Gridley, California. He died in Gridley on August 2, 1910. He was originally interred in New Helvetia Cemetery, Sacramento, California. When that area was chosen to become Miwok Middle School, Biggs was re-interred in the Sacramento Historic City Cemetery.

== Legacy ==
The city of Biggs, California was named after Biggs, who founded it.

== Electoral results ==
1886 United States House of Representatives elections in California, 2nd district
Party	Candidate	Votes	%
Democratic	Marion Biggs	17,667	50.0
Republican	J. C. Campbell	16,594	47.0
Prohibition	W. O. Clark	1,076	3.0
Total votes		35,337	100.0
Turnout			
Democratic gain from Republican			

1888 United States House of Representatives elections in California, 2nd district
Party	Candidate	Votes	%
Democratic	Marion Biggs (incumbent)	19,064	50.6
Republican	John A. Eagon	17,541	46.6
Independent	S. M. McLean	913	2.4
Know Nothing	J. F. McSwain	138	0.4
Total votes		37,656	100.0
Turnout			
Democratic hold			

Political offices
Preceded by Five members	California State Assemblyman, 16th District; 1867–1869 (with four others)	Succeeded by Five members
Preceded by R. M. Cochran, W. M. Ord	California State Assemblyman, 24th District (Butte County seat); 1869–1871 (with James C. Martin)	Succeeded by W. N. DeHaven, Joshua N. Turner
U.S. House of Representatives
Preceded by James A. Louttit	Member of the U.S. House of Representatives from California's 2nd congressional district 1887–1891	Succeeded by Anthony Caminetti
