= McKinley Park =

McKinley Park may refer to a place in the United States:

- McKinley Park, Alaska, a census-designated place in the Denali Borough
- McKinley Park, Chicago, Illinois, a neighborhood
- McKinley Park, Sacramento, California, a neighborhood park

== See also ==
- Denali National Park and Preserve, known as Mount McKinley National Park from 1917 to 1980
