= Sutter Middle School =

Sutter Middle School may refer to:

- Sutter Middle School in Folsom, California
- Miwok Middle School (known until 2023 as Sutter Middle School) in Sacramento, California
