= Miwok Middle School =

Public middle school in Sacramento, California, United States

Location
- 3150 I Street; Sacramento, CA 95816; United States; 38.573254°N 121.463715°W

Information
- Former names: Sutter Middle School, Sutter Junior High School
- Type: middle school
- Established: 1924
- Superintendent: Lisa Allen
- Principal: Cristin Tahara
- Faculty: 45 (on an FTE basis) (2021–22)
- Grades: 7–8
- Enrollment: 1,075 (2022–23)
- Athletics: Basketball, cheer, cross country, flag football, golf, soccer, softball, track, volleyball
- Mascot: Mighty Oaks (formerly the "Sutter Miners")
- Nickname: "The Pride of the City"
- Website: miwok.scusd.edu

Miwok Middle School is a public middle school located in Sacramento, California, United States, and is part of the Sacramento City Unified School District. It is the oldest of the school district's nine middle schools and has a rich history.

Miwok was established in 1924 at an existing school building at 1816 K Street that was previously used as the Sacramento Senior High School until expanding enrollment required reorganization.

In 1959, Miwok was moved to its current location at 3150 I Street on a property that was originally used as a cemetery for Sutter's Fort.

On June 22, 2023, the school district changed the school's name from Sutter Middle School to Miwok Middle School.

== History ==
=== 1816 K Street ===
The K Street school was constructed in 1908 as a senior high school. The building was an architectural landmark, designed by architect Rudolph A. Herold in a Georgian-style with red brick, trimmed with light sandstone accents. Statutes of Greek and Roman art and busts of William Shakespeare, John Milton, and Ralph Waldo Emerson, and Greek scholars filled the corridors, and the building had a dome with a stained glass skylight. When the building opened in 1908, the school was "regarded as the most outstanding high school west of the Rockies." "Its science laboratories with water, gas and electricity, the gymnasiums with lockers and showers and the spacious auditorium and stage made it the envy of rival institutions of the era."

The high school operated out of the K Street building until 1924 when growing enrollment resulted in the school district moving the high school to a larger site (34th Avenue and W Street) and the K Street building was repurposed as the new Sutter Junior High School. Sutter Junior High School operated out of the K Street building until the school moved to its current location on I Street in February 1959.

B.W. Painter was the first junior high principal. He was noted for whistling "loud enough to bring a noisy assembly of students to attention instantly."

=== New Helvetia Cemetery ===
In 1950s, the Sacramento Board of Education purchased the New Helvetia Cemetery grounds from the City of Sacramento for the construction of a new school. The school board paid the city to disinter all burials and clear the land. City officials initially believed there were 1,200 to 1,500 burials, but between October 1955 and March 1956 city contractors found 5,235 bodies.

On April 16, 1956, City Manager Bartley W. Cavanaugh told the Board of Education that "all bodies have been removed", but more human remains continued to be uncovered while the new school was being constructed in 1957 and 1958.

On February 2, 1959, the new school opened for classes atop the old cemetery grounds.

The California Office of Historic Preservation designated the New Helvetia Cemetery site a California Historical Landmark (number 592) in 1957. A historical plaque remembering the cemetery remains located near the intersection of Alhambra Boulevard and J Street.

=== New building at 3150 I Street ===
The new school was built using pre-stressed concrete columns, a somewhat novel construction technique for the time, and steel canopies sheltering exterior corridors. The buildings were constructed by Continental Construction; the canopies were formed by R.C. Mahon.

After construction, the Sacramento city planning director criticized the school board for reneging on an alleged commitment to respect a reasonable perimeter setback: "The purpose of setting fencing back is to permit screen landscaping lawn area and street tree planting to provide attractive appearance to adjacent residents who often must face into bare, unsightly school recreational areas. ... it was suggested that due to its prominent location some other treatment than cyclone fencing (which might well be relegated to industrial districts) be developed. ... It would seem safe to say that no private developer would treat this location in this manner and certainly public agencies have a responsibility to set a higher standard.”

In November 2024, Sacramento voters approved Measure D, authorizing the Sacramento City Unified School District to issue $543 million in bonds to fund school facilities and classroom modernization. The school district identified “New Miwok Middle School” on its projects list: "Work may include, but not limited to, replacement of buildings, new infrastructure in service of new space, sufficient classrooms and cafeteria space, gymnasium, administration space, including single point of access, and student and family support spaces."

== Name change ==
On June 22, 2023, the Board of Education approved changing the school's name from Sutter Middle School to Miwok Middle School. The school district explained: "Sutter Middle School has been a focal point for the Native American community in the Sacramento region due to the extreme brutality their communities experienced at the hands of John Sutter and his followers. [School Renaming Committee] members recommended Miwok Middle School as restorative to the Miwok people who were the inhabitants of our region when the Europeans came to California."

== Academic and extracurricular programs ==
In addition to Common Core and California Standards-Based Instruction in English, Math, Science and Social Science, Miwok's curriculum includes:

- Art
- Advanced Art
- Career Tech Ed (CTE)
- Computers
- Creative Writing
- Drama
- GATE
- Leadership
- Media Broadcast (a student-run production called "The Roots")
- Photography
- Robotics
- Spanish
- Study Skills
- Ukulele
- Woodshop
- Yearbook

Miwok's clubs and activities include:

- American Sign Language
- Anime Club
- Book Club
- Board Game Club
- Cooking Club
- Garden Club
- Kindness / Wellness Club
- Mathletes
- Minecraft Club
- Sewing and Crafts Club
- Skateboarding
- Newcomers Club
- Campus Light
- Speech & Debate
- Origami
- Chess Club
- K-Pop Club
- Orchestra

== Neighborhood ==
Miwok is located in East Sacramento near Midtown, directly across the street from the former site of the historic Alhambra Theatre, one block from the historic McKinley Park, and four blocks from the historic Sutter's Fort.
