= Alhambra Bowl =

Historic Sacramento bowling alley

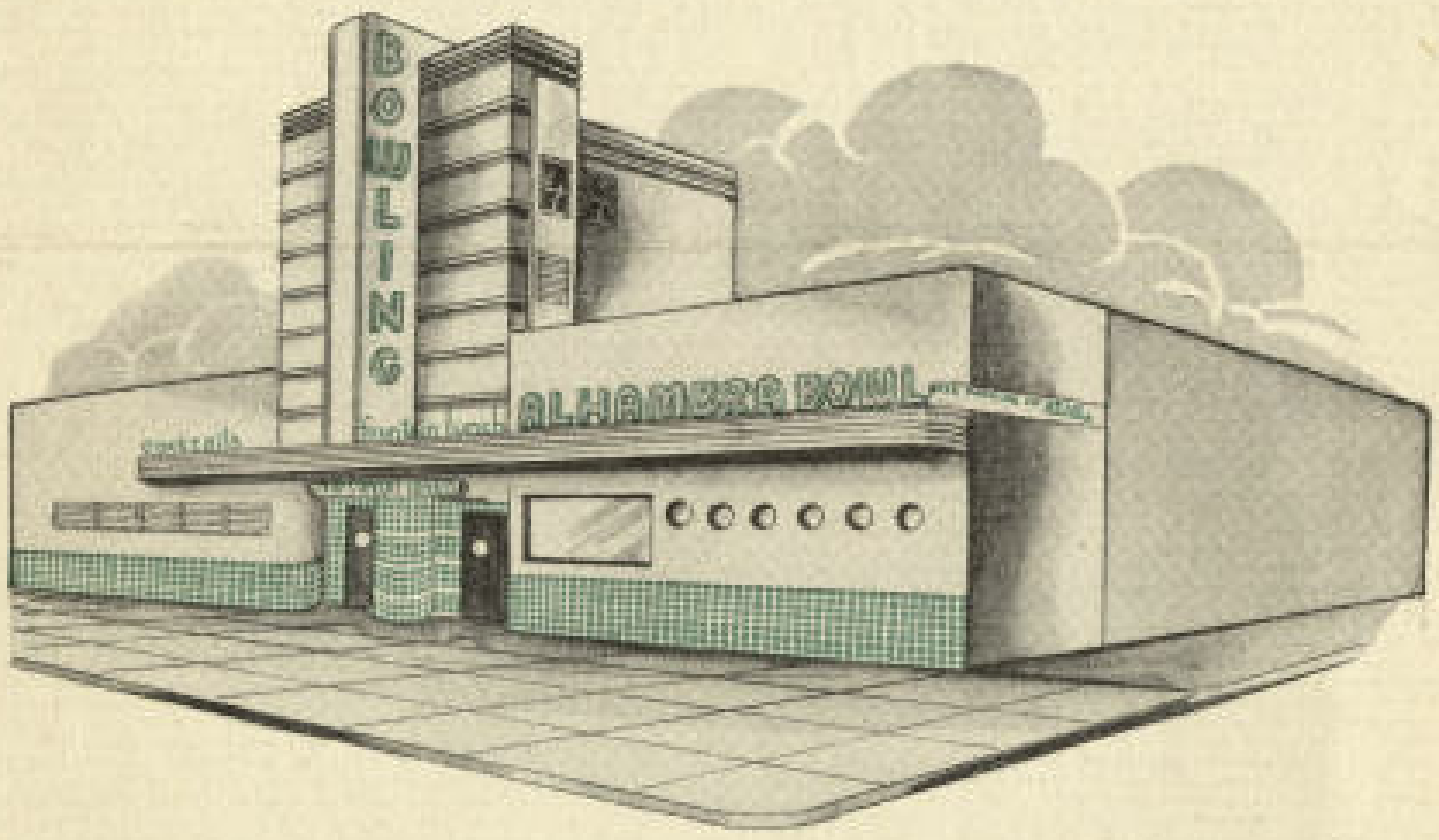
- Interactive map of Alhambra Bowl
- Address: 1229 Alhambra Blvd, Sacramento, CA 95816
- Coordinates: 38.570534°N 121.466285°W
- Owner: Johnny Bascou
- Type: Bowling center

Construction
- Built: 1942
- Opened: July 9, 1942
- Closed: April 30, 1982
- Demolished: 1985

Alhambra Bowl was a 16-lane bowling alley that operated in Sacramento, California from 1942 to 1982. Founded by professional bowler Johnny Bascou, it stood across the street from the Alhambra Theatre and became a landmark of mid-century Sacramento leisure culture. The building was destroyed in a fire in 1985.

== History ==
Alhambra Bowl was constructed in 1942 in Streamline Moderne style, featuring curved corners, horizontal banding, neon detailing, and a prominent vertical spire bearing a distinctive neon lettering.

Bascou opened Alhambra Bowl for business on July 9, 1942. A promotional flyer boasted 16 Brunswick Centennial lanes, photo-electronic foul lines, score casters, locker rooms and showers, a league meeting room, a cocktail lounge, spectator accommodations, air conditioning, and "free instruction."

Bascou previously owned Rialto Bowl in San Francisco. The Sacramento Bee sports editor wrote that Bascou, in the 1930s, was the first individual to bowl two consecutive perfect games. Although that distinction is not verified by other sources, Bascou was a well-known professional bowler.

Bascou opened the business in partnership with Butch Nisetich, a fellow bowler who previously ran a bar and gambling hall on K Street. In December 1942, Nisetich sold his share for $43,000 to Tom Laird, a San Francisco sports journalist. Later in the 1940s, Bascou continued the business as sole proprietor. In 1975, Bascou made his bartender, Carlos Zamora, a partner in the business; together they operated Alhambra Bowl until it closed on April 30, 1982.

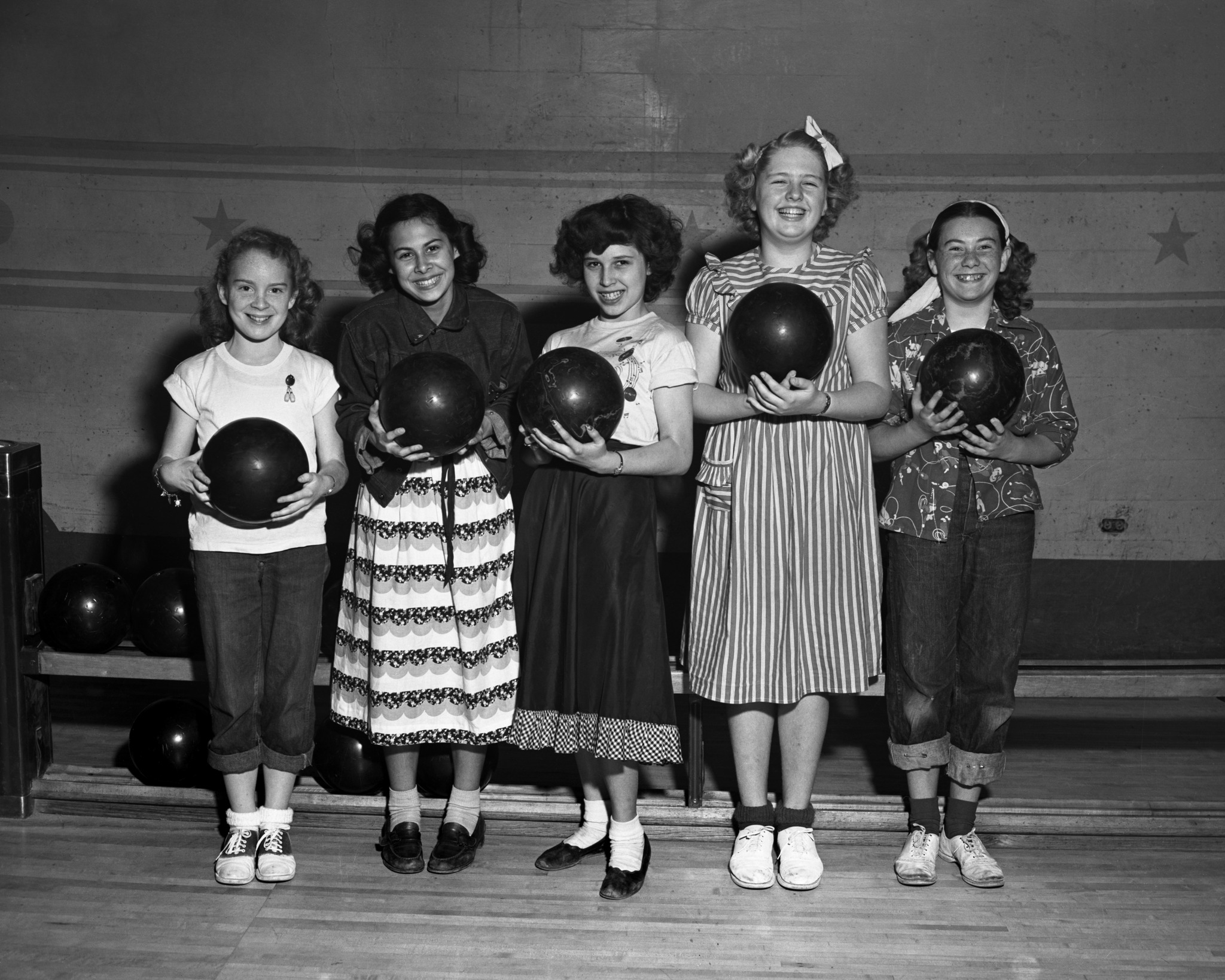
girls bowling at Alhambra Bowl (1947)

Bowling existed in Sacramento as early as the 1850s, though limited to a few lanes inside saloons, theaters, and private clubs. During Prohibition (1920–1933), institutions like the American Bowling Congress standardized the game and promoted new dry, purpose-built bowling halls. These often dropped the sketchy-sounding "alley" from their names, and rebranded themselves as healthy family-friendly recreation centers. After Prohibition, a nationwide construction wave of new "bowling palaces" followed—large establishments with many lanes—and bowling became a major outlet for socializing and recreation. Three post-Prohibition bowling palaces were built in the Sacramento area: Capital Bowl at 1415 L Street (1939), North Bowl at 1721 Del Paso Boulevard (1941), and Alhambra Bowl at 1229 Alhambra Boulevard (1942). In the 1940s and 50s, these three alleys hosted tournaments for the Sacramento Men's and Women's Bowling Associations.

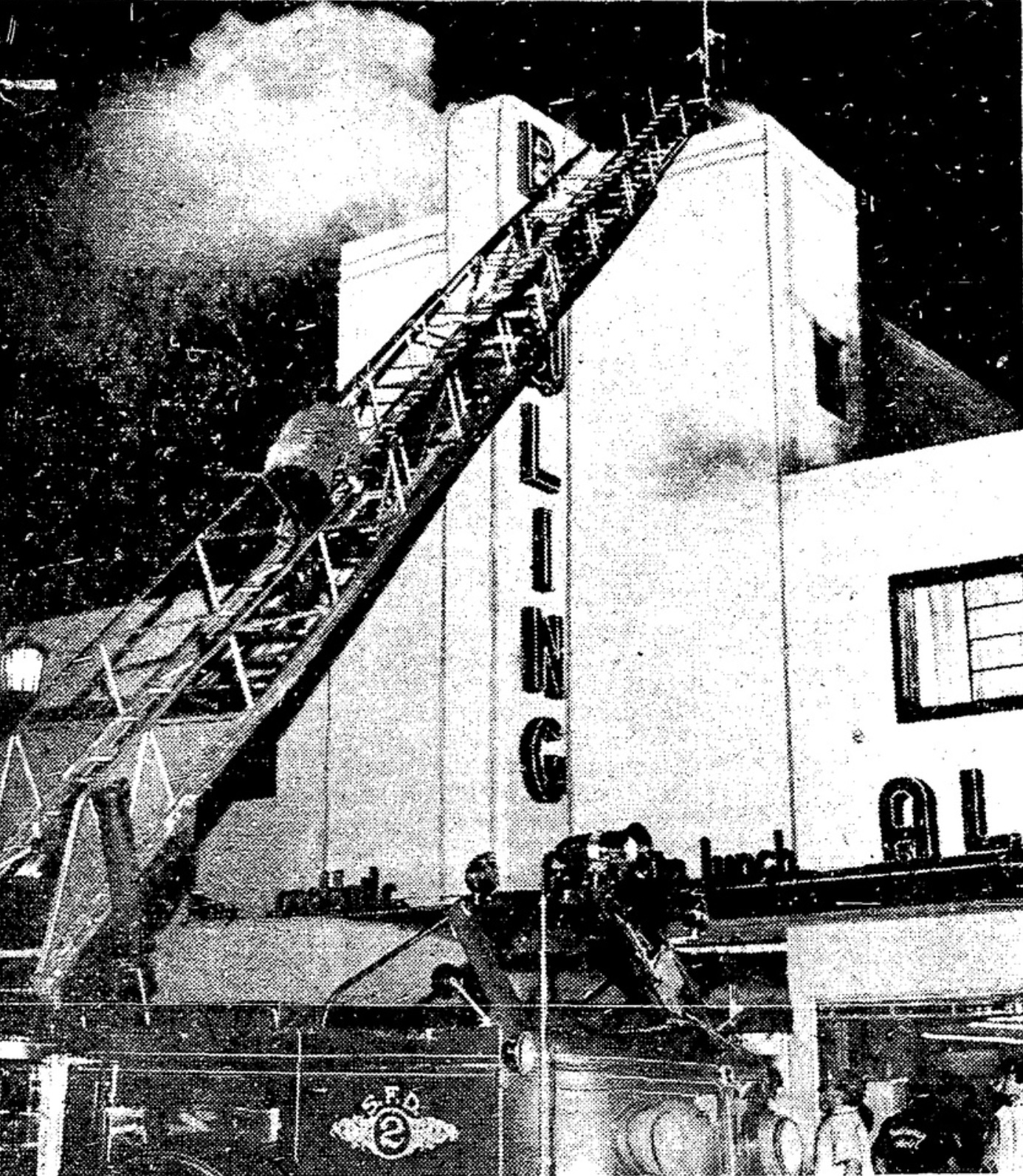
1958 fire

In 1958, faulty wiring in the large neon sign on the front of the building caused extensive smoke and fire damage. Bascou sued his sign repair company, alleging that the fire was caused by their faulty wiring—a case that led to a significant precedent in the legal doctrine of Res ipsa loquitur, holding that negligence can be inferred when electrical wiring causes a fire. Alhambra Bowl, Inc. v. Ledbetter Sign Co., 211 Cal. App. 2d 777.

Bascou encouraged league play and offered free lessons to new players. In the 1940s and 1950s, the Sacramento Women’s Bowling Association used Alhambra Bowl for its organizational meetings. In the 1970s, the River City Bowlers, Sacramento’s first gay and lesbian bowling league, met at Alhambra Bowl.

In the 1980s, bowling’s popularity was declining and competition from newer centers increased. Alhambra Bowl closed on April 30, 1982, after 40 years in operation. Around 2 a.m., Zamora rolled the last ball down Lane 12.

After sitting vacant for two years, Alhambra Bowl was destroyed in a fire on August 22, 1985. The Sacramento Bee reported, “At 1:34 p.m. the roof gave way and the Art Deco spire that held the Alhambra Bowl’s sign sagged and then suddenly collapsed into the heart of the blaze. That drew moans from some spectators and cheers from others.”

In 1984, the Sacramento Bee reported that, "In its 40 years, the center produced the greatest number of top-average bowlers, per capita, than any other house in the nation."
