= A.P. Smith =

A.P. Smith may refer to:

- Anthony Preston Smith (1812–1877), American horticulturist and Sacramento pioneer
- Paul Smith (American actor, born 1929) (Arthur Paul Smith), American actor known for his work in 20th-century television and film
