= James A. Louttit =

American politician (1848–1906)

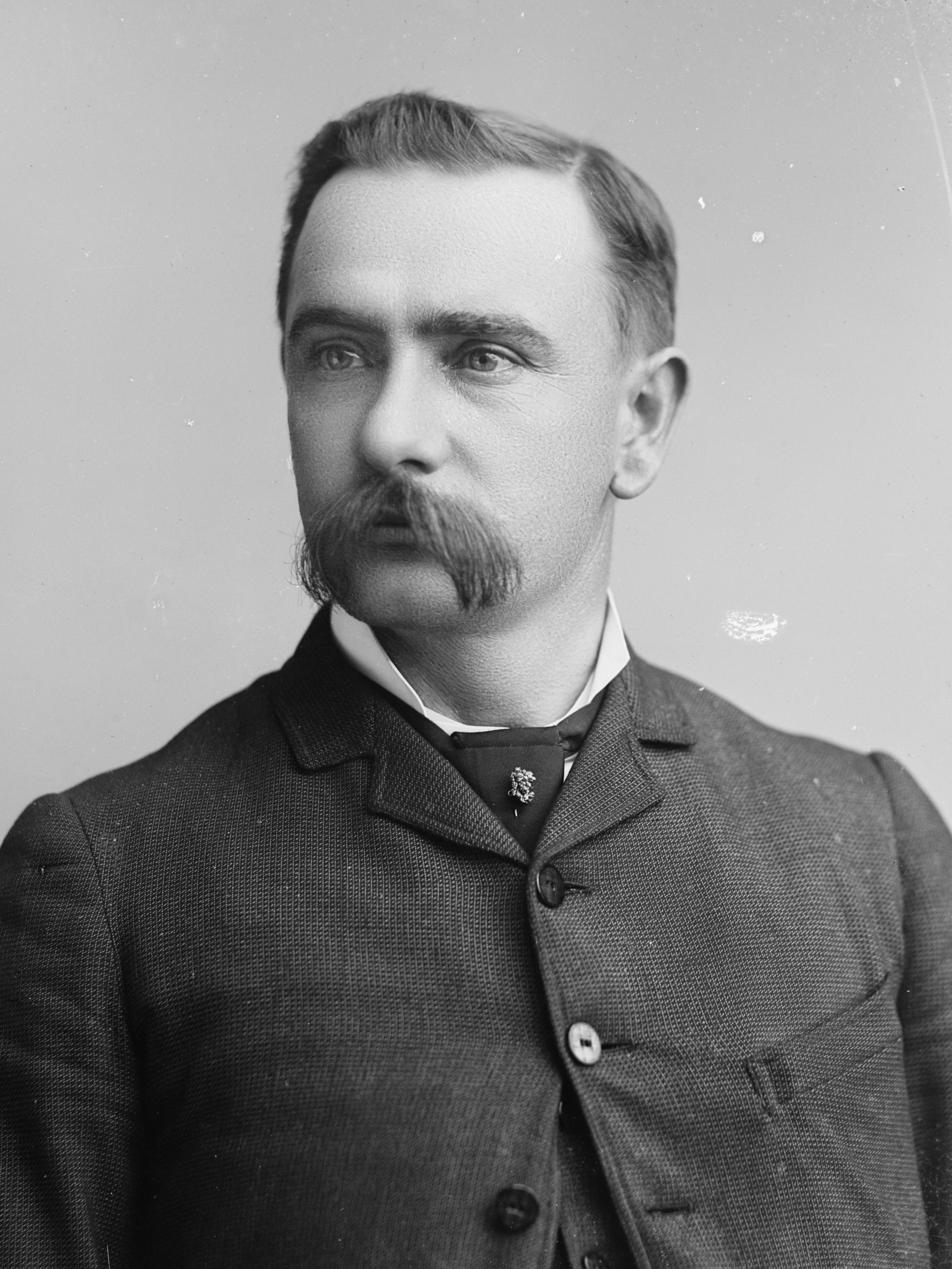
- Portrait c. 1885–1887

Member of the U.S. House of Representatives from California's 2nd district
- In office March 4, 1885 – March 3, 1887
- Preceded by: James Budd
- Succeeded by: Marion Biggs

Personal details
- Born: James Alexander Louttit; October 16, 1848 New Orleans, Louisiana, US
- Died: July 26, 1906 (aged 57) Pacific Grove, California, US
- Resting place: Stockton Rural Cemetery
- Party: Republican
- Profession: lawyer, politician

James Alexander Louttit (October 16, 1848 – July 26, 1906) was an American lawyer and politician who served one term as a U.S. representative from California from 1885 to 1887.

== Biography ==
Born in New Orleans, Louisiana, in 1849 he moved to California with his parents, who settled in Calaveras County. He attended private and public schools and the State normal school at Sacramento. He studied law and was admitted to the bar in 1869. He settled in Stockton, California, in 1871 and practiced law - he was prosecuting attorney of Stockton 1871–1879.

=== Congress ===
He was elected as a Republican to the Forty-ninth Congress (March 4, 1885 – March 3, 1887).

Congressman Louttit helped to found a Public Library in Lodi in 1885.

=== Later career and death ===
He was not a candidate for renomination in 1886, and resumed the practice of law in Stockton. He died in Pacific Grove, California on July 26, 1906, and was interred in the Stockton Rural Cemetery.

== Electoral history ==
1884 United States House of Representatives elections in California, 2nd district
Party	Candidate	Votes	%
Republican	James A. Louttit	18,327	49.4
Democratic	Charles Allen Sumner	18,208	49.1
Prohibition	Joshua B. Webster	558	1.5
Total votes		37,093	100.0
Turnout			
Republican gain from Democratic			

U.S. House of Representatives
Preceded by James H. Budd	Member of the U.S. House of Representatives from California's 2nd congressional district 1885–1887	Succeeded by Marion Biggs
