= River Park, Sacramento, California =

Neighborhood in Sacramento, California, United States

River Park
- Neighborhood of Sacramento
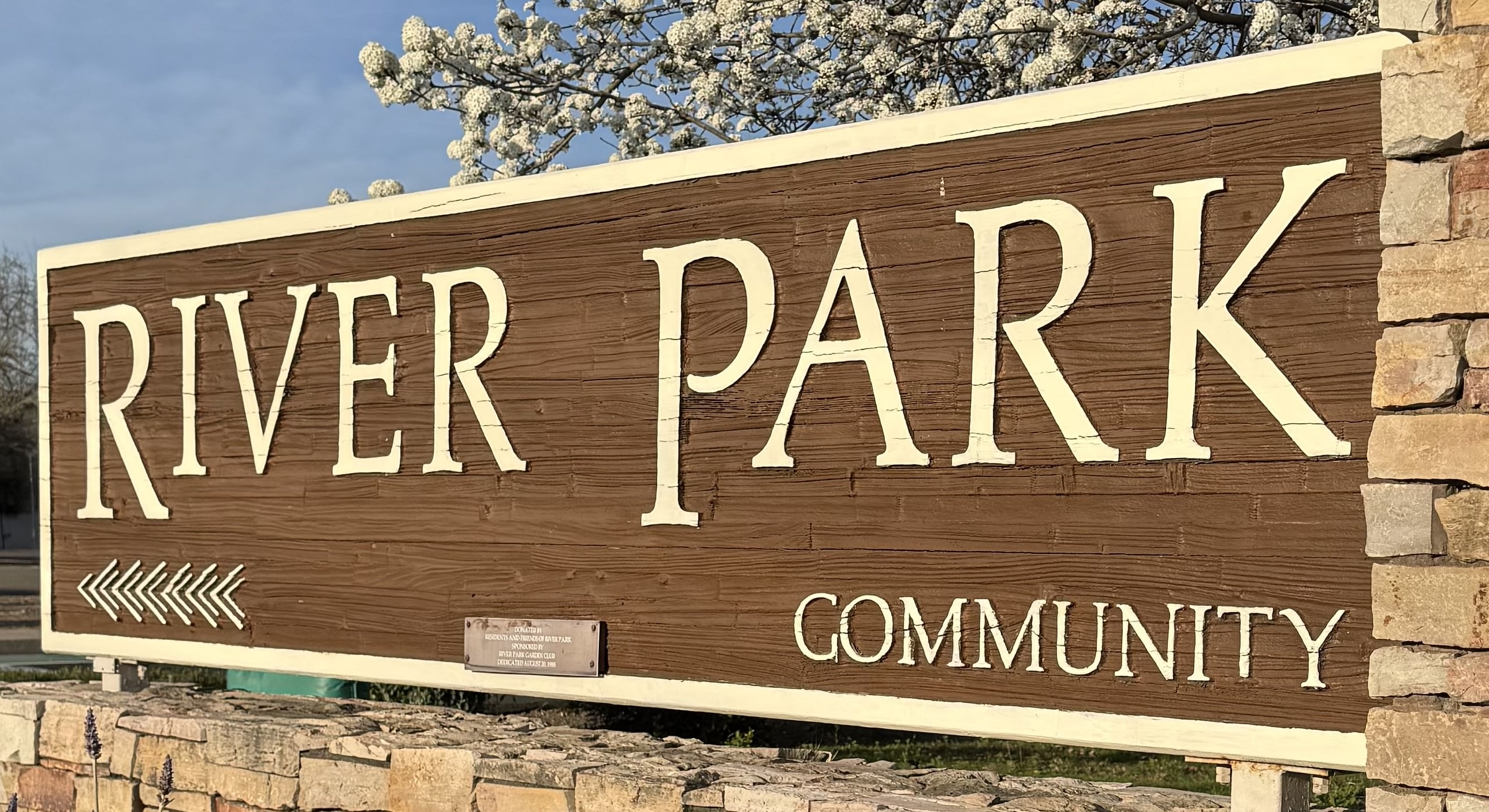
- Entrance sign to the River Park neighborhood in Sacramento, California
- Interactive map of River Park
- Coordinates: 38°34′35″N 121°25′50″W
- Country: United States
- State: California
- County: Sacramento
- City: Sacramento

Population (2023)
  - Total: 5,766
- Time zone: UTC−8 (Pacific)
  - Summer (DST): UTC−7 (PDT)
- ZIP Code: 95819-1736

River Park is a neighborhood in Sacramento, California about four miles east of downtown bounded to the north and east by a sweeping bend in the American River and to the west and south by a historic railroad line and H Street. The neighborhood is essentially a large cul-de-sac, two miles deep, with just two entrances one block apart on H Street.

== History ==
=== Smith's Gardens ===
In 1849, A.P. Smith purchased 50 acres from John Augustus Sutter Jr. on the south bank of the American River about three miles east of Sacramento, in present-day River Park. Smith developed the land into a plant nursery and orchard known as Smith's Gardens, importing and propagating novel varieties of fruit and shade trees, grape vines, flowers, and other plants, including some of the first zinfandel grapes, camellias, and roses in the region.

The gardens were famous throughout California as a botanical wonder. The Sacramento Bee remarked that the gardens were "to Sacramento what Golden Gate Park of recent years has been to San Francisco." The gardens were open to the public and hosted many visitors and community events. The Sacramento Valley Railroad and horse-drawn carriages competed to ferry visitors from Sacramento to and from the gardens. Shade trees lined the entrance and Smith laid out miles of walking paths constructed with crushed seashells he hauled upriver from San Francisco. In 1913, a historian remarked that these shell paths could still be found by digging down a few feet.

In the 1860s and 1870s, repeated floods on the American River destroyed the gardens and bankrupted Smith. By his death in 1877, the gardens had diminished to a "small, run-down fruit farm."

=== Ranches and orchards ===
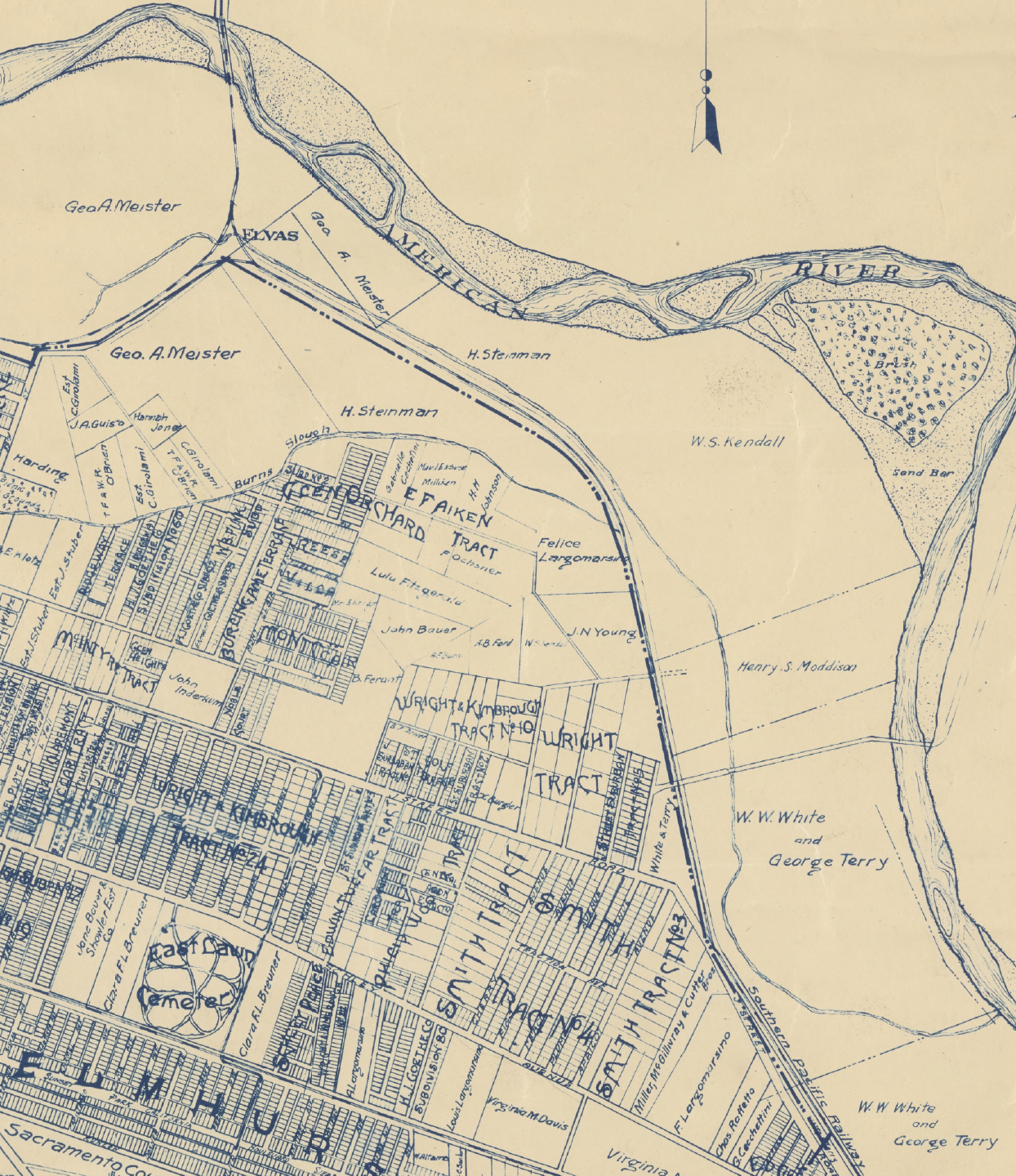
1915 map of River Park area

In the early 1900s, several wealthy businessmen owned most of what would become River Park. George A. Meister, a dairy executive and bank director, acquired most of what had been Smith's Gardens. H. Steinman, a jewelry store owner, owned land upriver from Meister. William S. Kendall, the president of a collection agency and owner of many ranches and orchards throughout Sacramento and the San Joaquin valleys, owned about 145 acres upriver from Steinman. Henry Smith Moddison operated an orchard and farm upriver from Kendall.

Henry S. Moddison died in 1941, and his property passed to his children: Henry C., Ruth (Moddison) Gunther, and Emily (Moddison) MacAdoo. Henry C. operated a gas station on the southwest corner of H and 56th streets from 1925 to 1954.

== Orchard Terrace and River Park subdivisions ==
By 1946, Louis Carlson and John Sandburg acquired the entire area except for the Moddisons' property. Carlson and Sandburg were wealthy developers, having partnered in a series of lucrative land acquisitions and mining operations.

In 1946, Carlson and Sandburg, along with the Moddisons, successfully petitioned the City of Sacramento to annex their properties—all of the land between the American River, the Southern Pacific Railroad tracks, and H Street. Realtors George Spilman and W.A. Callister represented Carlson and Sandburg in their development proposal.

1948 advertisement for lots in Orchard Terrace

Lots in the first subdivision, known as Orchard Terrace Unit One, were offered in 1947. Lots in the second subdivision, Orchard Terrace Unit Two, were offered in 1948. Subdivision advertisements touted the neighborhood as being thoughtfully laid out by "nationally known City Planner" Will G. Norris, with "rambling" "California Rancho" style homes," "fruit trees in many lots," close to "city conveniences."

In the 1950s, additional subdivisions filled the remainder of River Park, and a shopping center was developed near the neighborhood entrance. The initial tenants of the shopping center were Hart's Bakery, Swanson's Cleaners, a Union Oil service station, a beauty shop, a drugstore, a hardware store, and a bodega.

Carlson, Sandburg, and the Moddisons named the initial River Park street names after themselves, their family, and their business associates:

- Ada Way: Ada Carlson (Carlson's wife)
- Betty Way: Betty (Carlson) Roger (Carlson's sister)
- Carlson Drive: Louis D. Carlson (developer)
- Callister Avenue: W.A. Callister (realtor for Carlson and Sandburg)
- Dittmar Way: Shirley C. Dittmar (realtor for the Moddisons)
- Gunther Way: Ruth (Moddison) Gunther (daughter of Henry S. Moddison)
- Jerome Way: Jerome "Jerry" Carlson (nephew of Carlson)
- Lovella Way: Lovella (Sandburg) Shepard (Sandburg's daughter)
- McAdoo Avenue: Emily (Moddison) McAdoo (daughter of Henry S. Moddison)
- Messina Drive: C. Mike Messina (escrow officer for the Moddisons)
- Minerva Avenue: Minnie Sandburg (Sandburg's wife)
- Moddison Avenue: Henry S. Moddison (ranch owner)
- Roger Way: Hugh Roger and Betty (Carlson) Roger (Carlson's sister)
- Ruth Court: Ruth (Moddison) Gunther (daughter of Henry S. Moddison)
- Sandburg Drive: John Sandburg (developer)
- Shepard Avenue: Lovella (Sandburg) Shepard (Sandburg's daughter)
- Spilman Avenue: W. George Spilman (realtor for Carlson and Sandburg)
- Wanda Way: Wanda Sandburg (Sandburg's daughter)

== Adjacent infrastructure ==
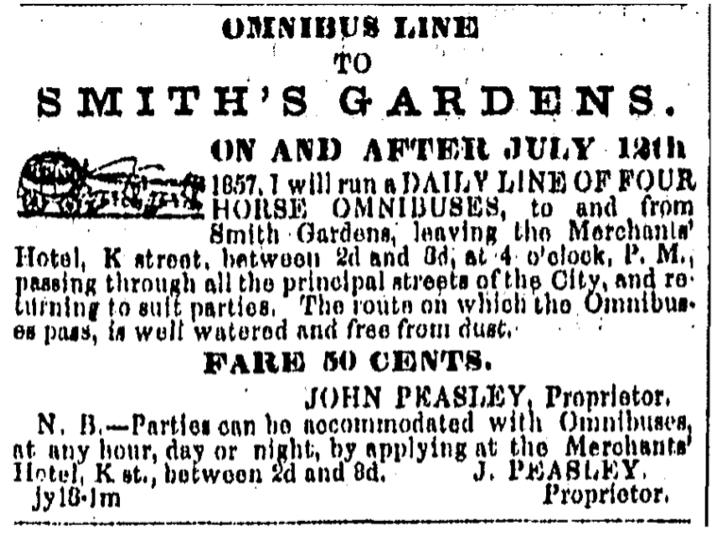
Advertisement for carriage rides to Smith's Gardens (Sacramento Bee, 1857)

River Park has been shaped and influenced by adjacent infrastructure. In the 1850s, the Sacramento Valley Railroad (later acquired by the Southern Pacific Railroad) built a rail line from downtown Sacramento to Smith's Gardens. The gardens were situated just upriver from an important river crossing, Norris' Bridge. The rail line was eventually expanded with an intersection near Smith's Gardens, one line crossing the American River at Norris' Bridge to the north, another line continuing east below Smith's Gardens. The rail line is built on the top of a levee that forms a physical barrier between River Park and the rest of East Sacramento. River Park is burrowed between the rail line levee and a levee along the riverbank.

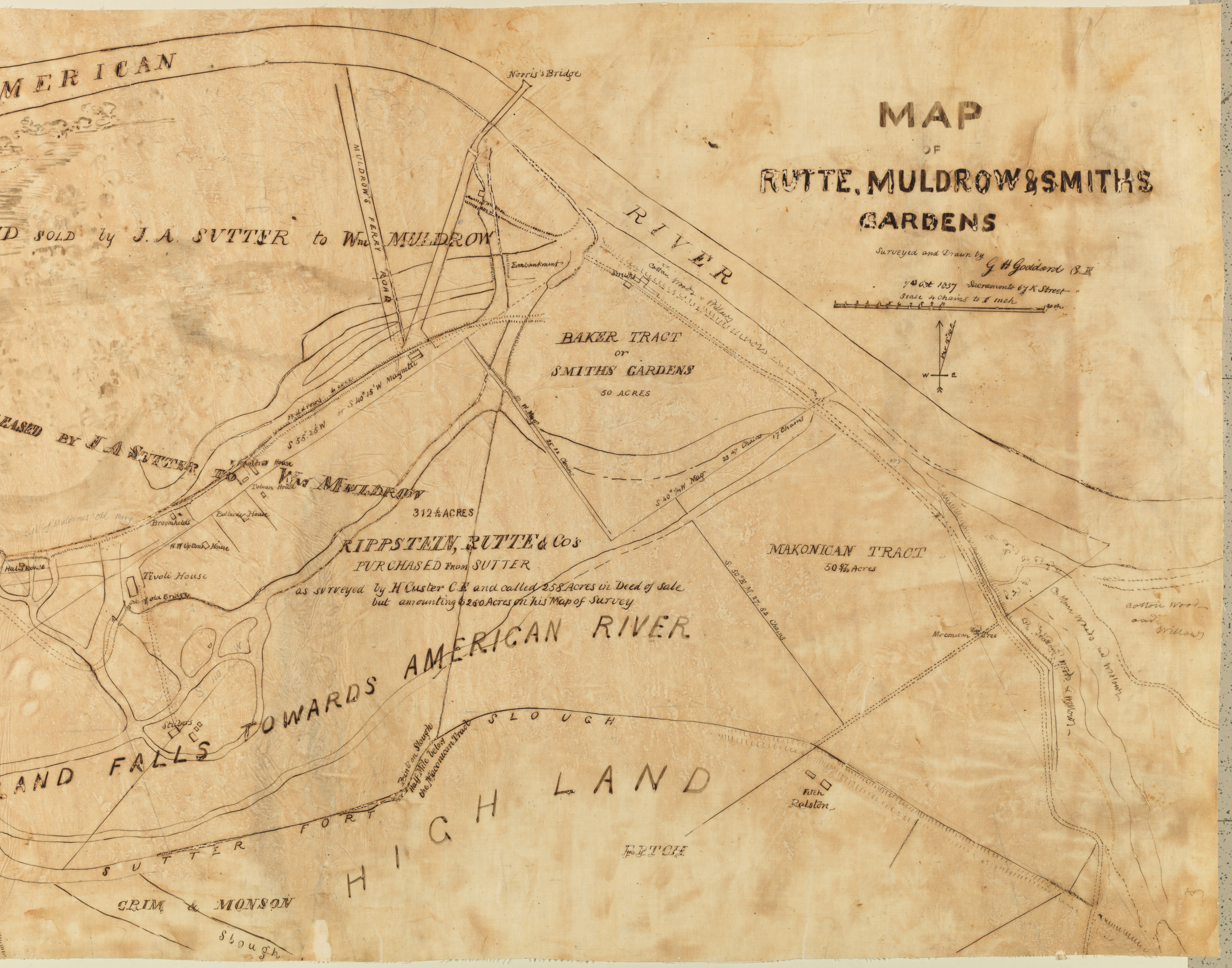
1857 map of River Park area

Norris' Bridge crossing was developed into separate bridges for rail and vehicles, and it eventually became the river crossing for the I-80 Business Capital City Freeway. A Caltrans construction project to be completed in 2026 will add a bike lane to the freeway bridge, connecting the River Park levee to the Cal Expo & State Fair grounds just across the river.

The three-way rail intersection, known as Elvas Station, initially required a manual switch, and a structure, the Elvas Tower, was built to shelter the switch operator. The tower was decommissioned in 1999.

Elvas Station was a significant migration hub for stowaway train riders. Migrant workers, unhoused people, and other travelers frequently hopped trains at the Elvas Station. These groups also camped near the rail line and along the riverbank.

H Street, the southern boundary of River Park, also became an important river crossing. A vehicle bridge was built in 1912, and the current truss bridge was built in 1932. The H Street river access was a popular recreational fishing, swimming, and camping area. Emil Clemens Horst operated one of the first commercial hop farms in California just across the river on the east bank of the H Street bridge. Horst leased his riverbank as a public swimming area that was very popular through the 1920s and 30s. On a particularly busy day in 1929, the Sacramento Bee reported that 9,364 people visited the beach." In 1930, the City of Sacramento paid for lifeguards to work at the beach.

In 1952, just as River Park was being developed, Sacramento State College opened upriver, adjacent to River Park. The university brought an influx of students, staff, and faculty needing housing.

Residents and businesses became outraged at congestion on H Street, called for a moratorium on new development, and lobbied for improved infrastructure and traffic planning through neighborhood associations, including the newly formed River Park–Orchard Terrace Improvement Association (later changing its name to the River Park Neighborhood Association). Congestion was exacerbated by the growing River Park neighborhood with just two entrances on H Street; the new university's main entrance; the newly relocated state fairgrounds just across the river; and single-lane underpasses on J and H Streets under the Southern Pacific line. Much of River Park and the new university were developed over wetlands and the reduction of natural drainage in the area exacerbated street flooding during rainfall. The city and county responded by routing traffic from the H Street bridge to separate entrances for the university on J Street and River Park on H Street, expanding the railroad underpasses on J Street and on H Street; and improving the drainage network, including a new drainage canal under the River Park entrance.

The Scottish Rite Masonic Center began construction in 1962 at the entrance to River Park. The Center hosts community events, provides a large parking lot for special events like the post-race party for the annual Run to Feed the Hungry race, and served as a mass vaccination center during the COVID-19 pandemic.

== Caleb Greenwood Elementary School ==
Carlson and Sandburg's initial development plans proposed a school in the center of the neighborhood. The Sacramento Board of Education opened Caleb Greenwood Elementary School on September 10, 1950. The school is named for frontiersman Caleb Greenwood, famous in early California history for leading the first wagon train over the Sierra Nevada.

In 1950, the school had 30 students. By 1952, there were 357. Two new wings of classrooms were built in March 1953. A new portable classroom was added in 1954. A recreation area behind the school was landscaped in 1955 with the combined efforts of the Orchard Terrace-River Park Improvement Association, the River Park Garden Club, and a parent-teacher association. 65 trees were planted in and around the school yard. A cafeteria and multi-purpose room were completed in 1957.

As of 2023-24, Caleb Greenwood had 497 students with about 19 full-time equivalent (FTE) certificated staff.

== Glen Hall Park and Paradise Beach ==
In 1950, Carlson and Sandburg sold back to the city 47 acres of uninhabitable riverbank outside the levee and an additional 7 acres inside the levee for use as a public park. The riverbank was developed into Paradise Beach, a popular recreational area. The park became Glen Hall Park, which includes a swimming pool, baseball diamond, soccer fields, tennis courts, a picnic area, and a playground.

The Sacramento Bee called Paradise Beach "a lover's lane attraction" in 1957 and "Sacramento's No. 1 nude sunbathing beach" in 1974. After growing moral outrage, in 1975, the city council adopted an ordinance banning nudity on public beaches.

Paradise Beach remains a popular river access and a popular place for dogs. Paradise Beach includes miles of hiking and biking trails, including the Beaver Trail, which has been beaver habitat since the time of A.P. Smith.

In 2024, the United States Army Corps of Engineers controversially removed many trees from the riverbanks while making improvements to the levee.

== Garden Club ==
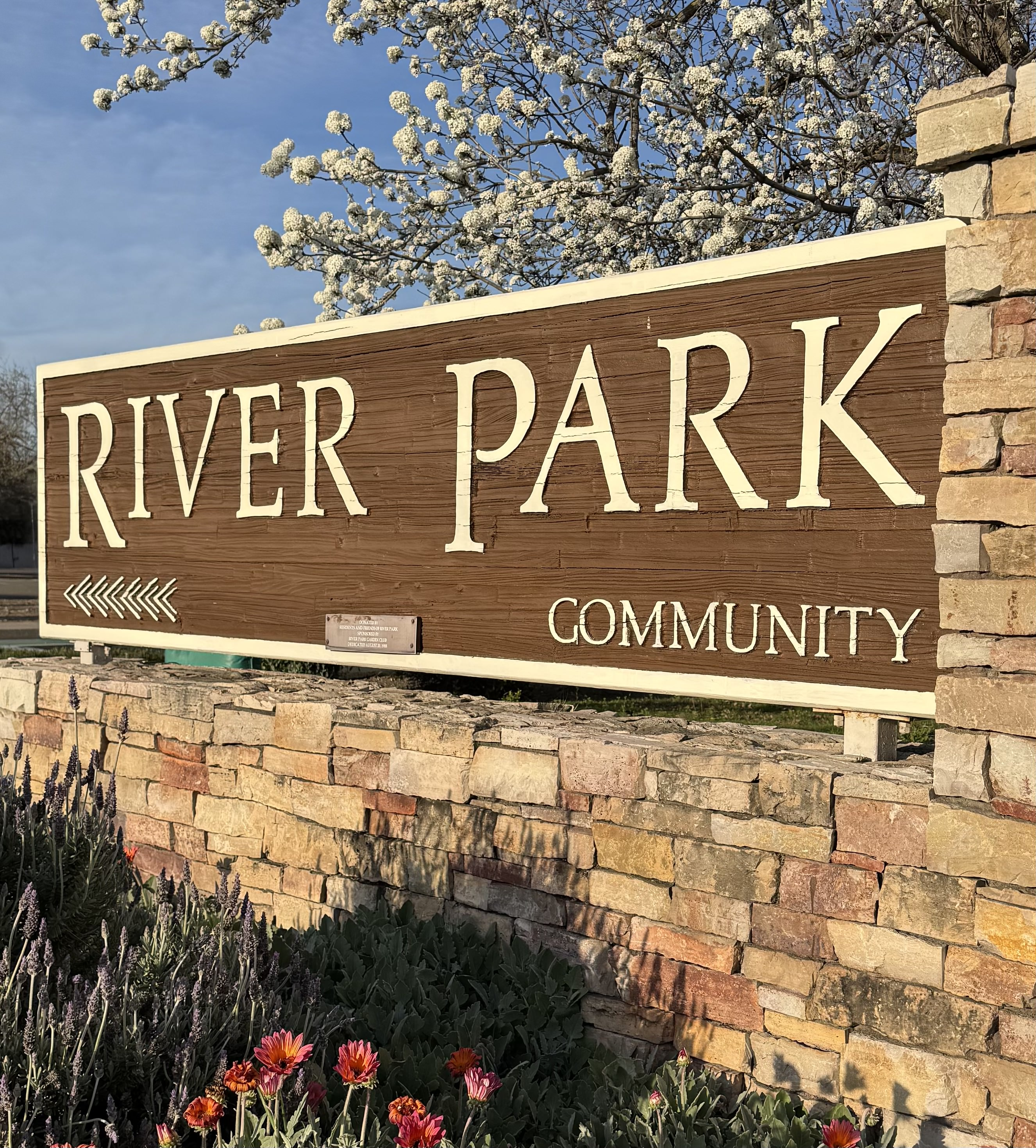
Entrance sign to River Park

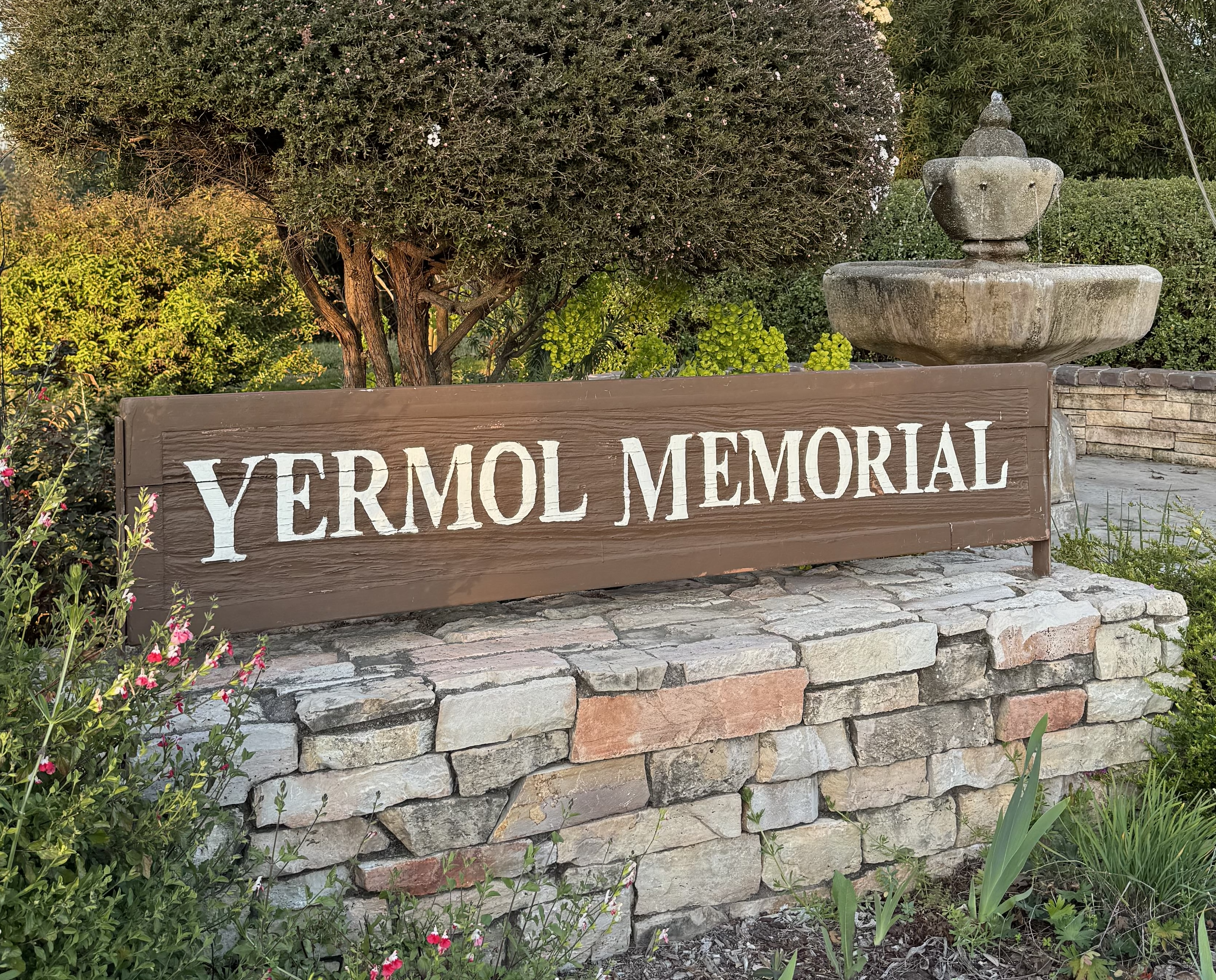
Memorial to Frances and Roy Yermol, next to entrance sign

In 1951, River Park residents organized a Garden Club. The club has worked on many landscaping and tree-planting projects around the neighborhood for decades, including the entrance to the River Park neighborhood, Caleb Greenwood School, Chiavella Baseball Field, and Glen Hall Park.

In 1981, Garden Club member Frances Yermolkaitis ("Fran Yermol") began leading a landscaping project to beautify the main entrance to River Park at H Street and Carlson Avenue, which resulted in a prominent entrance sign for the neighborhood. Her efforts became well known, earning her the nickname "River Park Flower Lady," and in 1987 she was awarded a "Key to the City." In 1998, a fountain near the River Park entrance sign was dedicated to her and her husband, Roy.

== Chiavella Baseball Field ==
In 1955, River Park residents formed a Little League Baseball league. The league initially used a field on H and Camellia streets at what is now the Scottish Rite Masonic Center. In 1962, the league leased space in a different neighborhood, at Erlewine Elementary School. In 1963, the league began leasing park space at 3770 Moddison Avenue in River Park from the City of Sacramento. Herb Ciavarella, a skilled mason and the league’s vice president for maintenance and grounds, led parents in building two diamonds on the site, which is named in his honor.

== Demographics and culture ==
In 2023, River Park had a population of 5,766. The neighborhood is 57% White, 21.3% Hispanic or Latino, 6.4% two or more races, 6.2% Black, 5.6% Asian, and 2.8% other races.

A 1994 analysis by the Sacramento Bee highlighted River Park's strong culture of community involvement and participation in neighborhood groups. The neighborhood has a high density of public employees and people adept at navigating government bureaucracies—many people "know the system and embrace it"—which has earned the neighborhood a reputation for exerting outsized political power.
