= Tower Theatre (Sacramento, California) =

Movie theater in Sacramento, California, U.S.

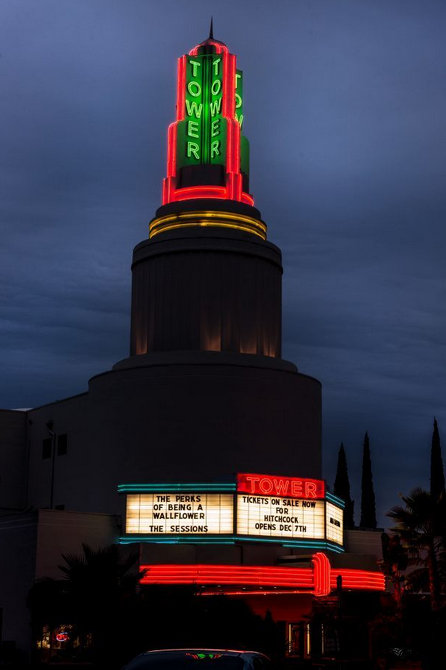
- Interactive map of Tower Theatre
- Address: 2508 Land Park Drive
- Location: Sacramento, California
- Coordinates: 38.5616°N 121.4935°W
- Owner: Reading Cinemas
- Type: Movie theatre

Construction
- Opened: 1938

Website
- www.angelikafilmcenter.com/tower

The Tower Theatre, built in 1938, is a Sacramento, California landmark and the oldest remaining, continuously running picture palace The famous record chain Tower Records is named after it because its original store was built into the side of it.

The theater was designed by California theater architect William B. David in the Streamline Moderne style of architecture. The original owner was Joseph Blumenfeld, a second generation theatre owner. At the time, there was only one movie screen. The first movie shown was Algiers. The theatre was renovated in 1972 and divided into a three-screen cinema.

They were bought by the Reading International theater chain in 1998, who, upgraded the theater in 2012 with digital projectors. In 2016, it was sold to an endowment fund as a long-term investment.

The theater has showcased the premieres of Colin Hanks’ All Things Must Pass and Greta Gerwig's Lady Bird. Both Hanks and Gerwig are Sacramento natives.

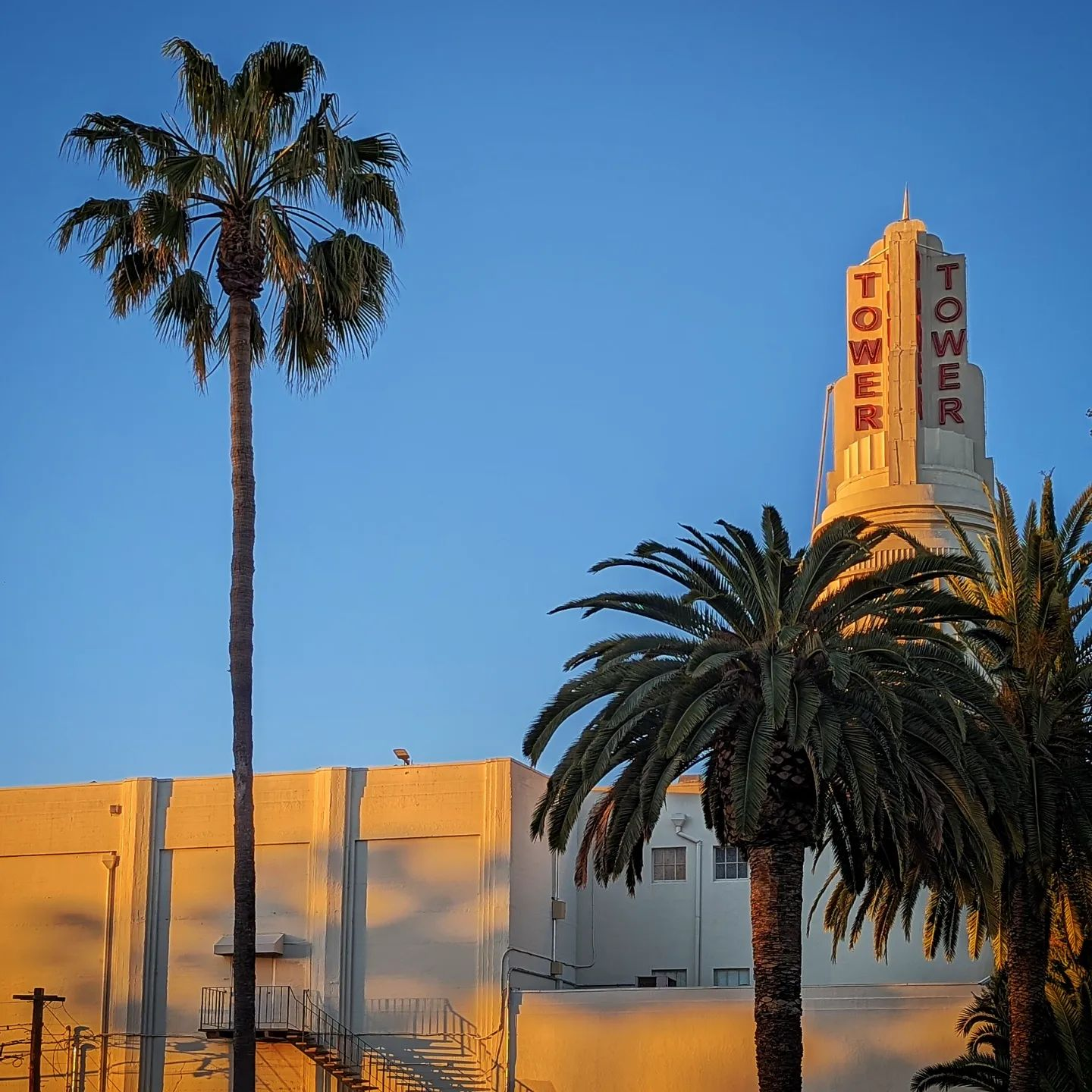

== See also ==
- Alhambra Theatre (Sacramento)
- Crest Theatre
