= Federal Building (Sacramento) =

- U.S. Post Office, Courthouse and Federal Building, Sacramento
- U.S. National Register of Historic Places
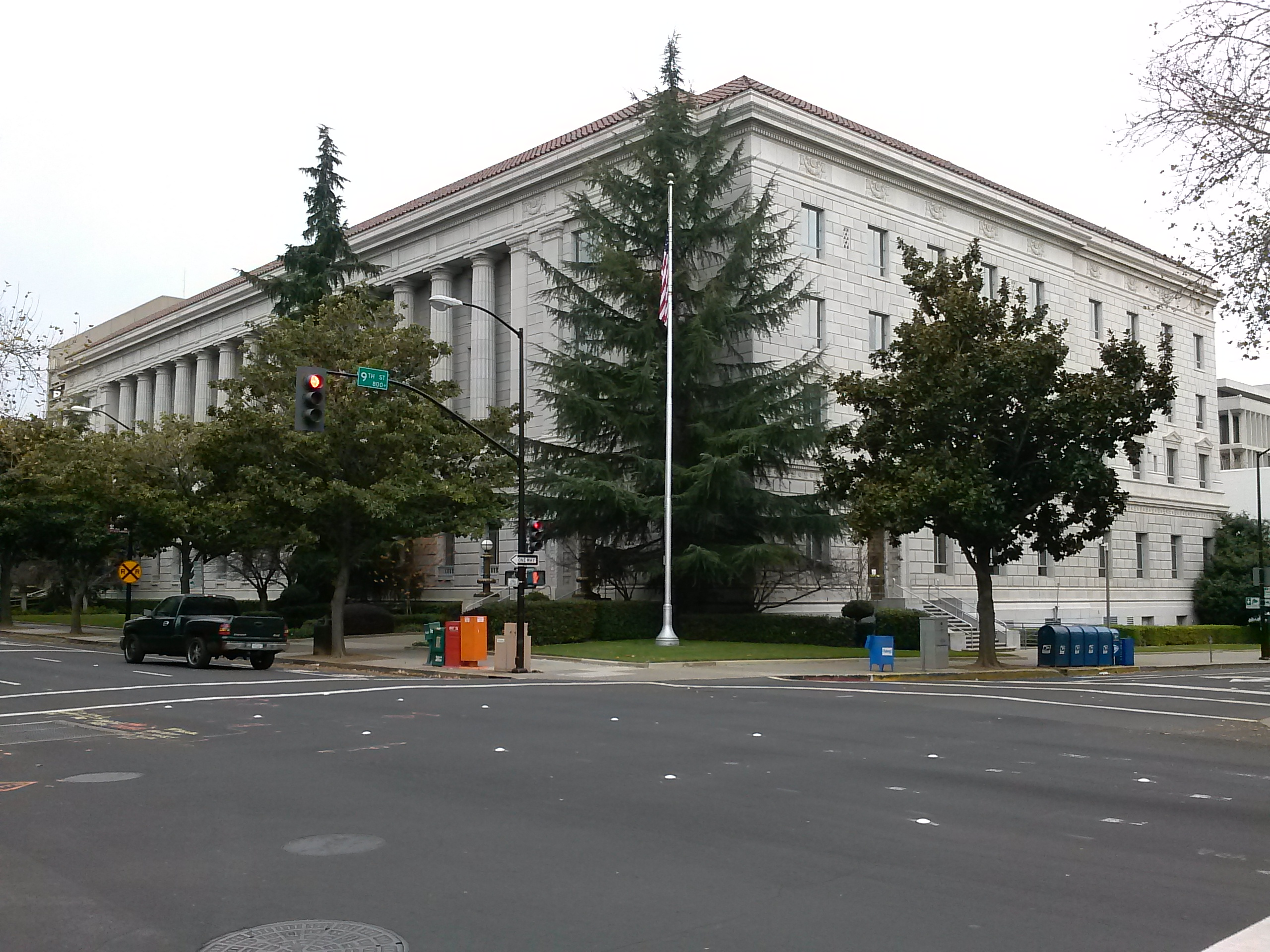
- Sacramento Federal Building, 2012

- Location within Sacramento, California Location within California Location within the United States
- Location: 801 I St., Sacramento, California
- Coordinates: 38°34′56.5″N 121°29′41.4″W
- Area: less than one acre
- Built: 1933
- Architect: Starks & Flanders
- Architectural style: French Renaissance Revival
- NRHP reference No.: 80000835
- Added to NRHP: January 25, 1980

The Federal Building, formerly the U.S. Post Office, Courthouse and Federal Building, is located in Downtown Sacramento, California.

== History ==
The Federal Building was designed by the local firm Starks and Flanders, who also designed the Elks Tower, the Alhambra Theatre, and the C. K. McClatchy High School. It reflects several early 20th Century Revival architectural styles, including Neoclassical, and especially a simplified Renaissance Revival style from the original French Renaissance architecture era. Construction was completed in 1933. The legacy firm of Starks and Flanders is Nacht & Lewis Architects which is still operating in Sacramento.

== Uses ==
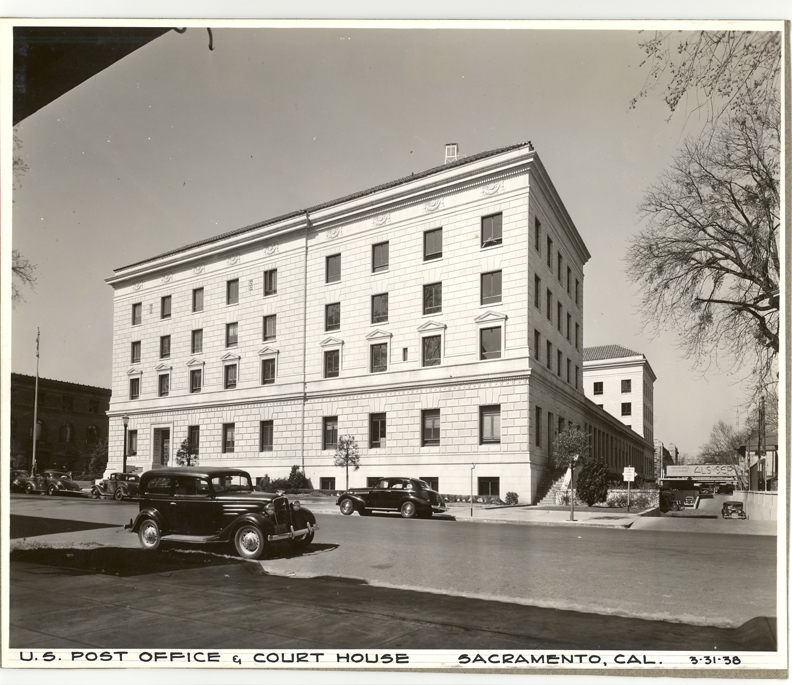
1938 view, looking southwest from 9th street

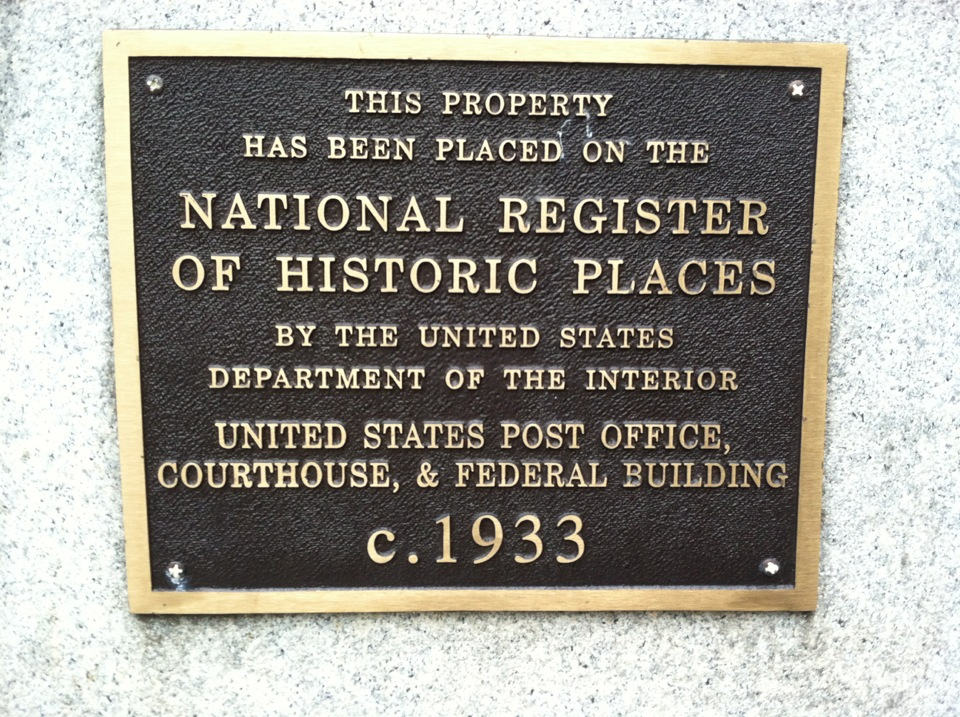
NRHP Plaque

The building has served historically as a courthouse, a post office, and a government office building.

It previously served the United States District Court for the Northern District of California until the United States District Court for the Eastern District of California was created in 1966.

The post office moved its operations to the Westfield Downtown Plaza on July 31, 2012.

== Landmark ==
The 'Federal Building' was listed on the National Register of Historic Places in 1980.

== See also ==
- List of United States federal courthouses in California
- History of Sacramento, California
- National Register of Historic Places listings in Sacramento County, California
- California Historical Landmarks in Sacramento County, California
- List of United States post offices
