= New Helvetia Cemetery =

First cemetery in Sacramento, California (1845–1912)

- Interactive map of New Helvetia Cemetery

Details
- Established: c. 1845
- Closed: 1912
- Location: 924 Alhambra Boulevard, Sacramento, California, U.S.
- Country: United States
- Coordinates: 38.57316°N 121.46399°W
- Type: Private (1845–1859), Public (1860–1912)
- Size: 20 acres (8.1 ha)
- No. of graves: at least 5,237
- Find a Grave: New Helvetia Cemetery

California Historical Landmark
- Reference no.: 592

New Helvetia Cemetery, initially named Sutter Fort Burying Ground, was a cemetery founded in c. 1845 and closed in 1912, formerly located at the northeast corner of Alhambra Boulevard and J Street (present-day 924 Alhambra Boulevard) in the East Sacramento neighborhood of Sacramento, California. It was the first cemetery in the city of Sacramento.

In the 1950s, bodies were disinterred and moved to other city cemeteries, and a school was constructed on the site, now Miwok Middle School (formerly Sutter Middle School).

The site is listed as a California Historical Landmark (number 592) by the California Office of Historic Preservation since May 22, 1957.

== History ==
The New Helvetia cemetery was founded by Swiss pioneer John A. Sutter in c. 1845 (some sources state 1848), under the name the Sutter Fort Burying Ground (or "Sutter's Bury-ing Ground"), and in 1850 the name was changed to the New Helvetia Cemetery when Sutter donated the land. The name New Helvetia (or New Switzerland) was also used by Sutter for a 19th-century Alta California settlement (part of present-day East Sacramento) founded in August 1839. The earliest graves in this cemetery were shallow and marked with wooden boards. This land often flooded so buried bodies were often moved and reinterred to Sacramento Historic City Cemetery and the records were not often kept. Adjacent to the cemetery was the New Helvetia Park picnic grounds, and Chevra Kaddisha Cemetery, the first Jewish cemetery in California was located across the street.

One of the first recorded burials was Major Cloud, a paymaster in the United States Army who was fatally injured in a fall from his horse in 1847 near Sutter's Fort. Some sources claim Major Cloud was the first interment, but the timing of Cloud's death is not consistent with historian Gail Jenner's claim that the first recorded interments at Sutter's "Bury-ing Ground" occurred in 1845.

In 1850, a cholera outbreak swept through the city and some 800 people were buried in a mass grave at New Helvetia Cemetery. Other people buried here included Chinese miners, indigent burials, and the people killed during the 1850 Squatters' riot. The northeast corner of the cemetery was specifically designated for Chinese burials. After 1860, the cemetery was deeded to the city. On April 29, 1861, a statute of the State of California (number CCXLIII) gave permission to disinter the early burials from this cemetery, in order to be "laid out and arranged in a proper manner". Because of the early years of flooding issues, there was continued talk of abandonment and elimination of the cemetery.

The cemetery stopped operating in 1912. After the 1920s, the grounds were used as a public park. City officials may have already begun to remove grave stones and brick borders by then. A 1952 Sacramento Bee article reports that Adolph Teichert Jr., a prominent Sacramento businessman with relatives buried in the cemetery, told the city council, "As I remember it, when we made an agreement with the city of Sacramento to give up our plots and allow the old brick walls to be leveled and tombstones removed, it was with the expressed stipulation that the city would make a park out of it and keep it inviolate in perpetuity."

In 1950s, the Sacramento Board of Education purchased the land and paid the city to disinter all burials and clear the land for the construction of a new Sutter Junior High School. City officials initially believed 1,200 to 1,500 people were buried in the cemetery. Between October 1955 and March 1956, however, city contractors disinterred thousands of bodies, moving them to East Lawn Memorial Park and Sacramento Historic City Cemetery. City officials were surprised to find many unmarked and unrecorded graves.

On April 16, 1956, City Manager Bartley W. Cavanaugh told the Board of Education that "all bodies have been removed"---he counted 5,235 bodies. But more human remains continued to be uncovered while the new school was being constructed in 1957 and 1958.

During the disinterment process, workers piled headstones by the street and many headstones were moved to private houses and used as a building material. In the 2010s, the Sacramento County Cemetery Advisory Commission began trying to locate the old headstones; by 2016 it had recovered 72.

On February 2, 1959, Sutter Junior High School (previously located at 18th Avenue and K Street) opened for classes in its new building atop the old cemetery grounds.

== Notable burials ==
- Hardin Bigelow (1809–1850), first mayor of Sacramento
- Marion Biggs (1823–1910), California congressman of two-term
- Major Jeremiah Huddleston Cloud (d. 1850), paymaster for the U.S. Army
- W. B. Gildes, physician buried in 1846
- Philippine Keseberg (d. 1877), wife of Donner Party cannibalist Lewis Keseberg

== See also ==
- California Historical Landmarks in Sacramento County
- List of cemeteries in California
