= Mohr and Yoerk Market =

Historic building in California, United States

- U.S. National Register of Historic Places
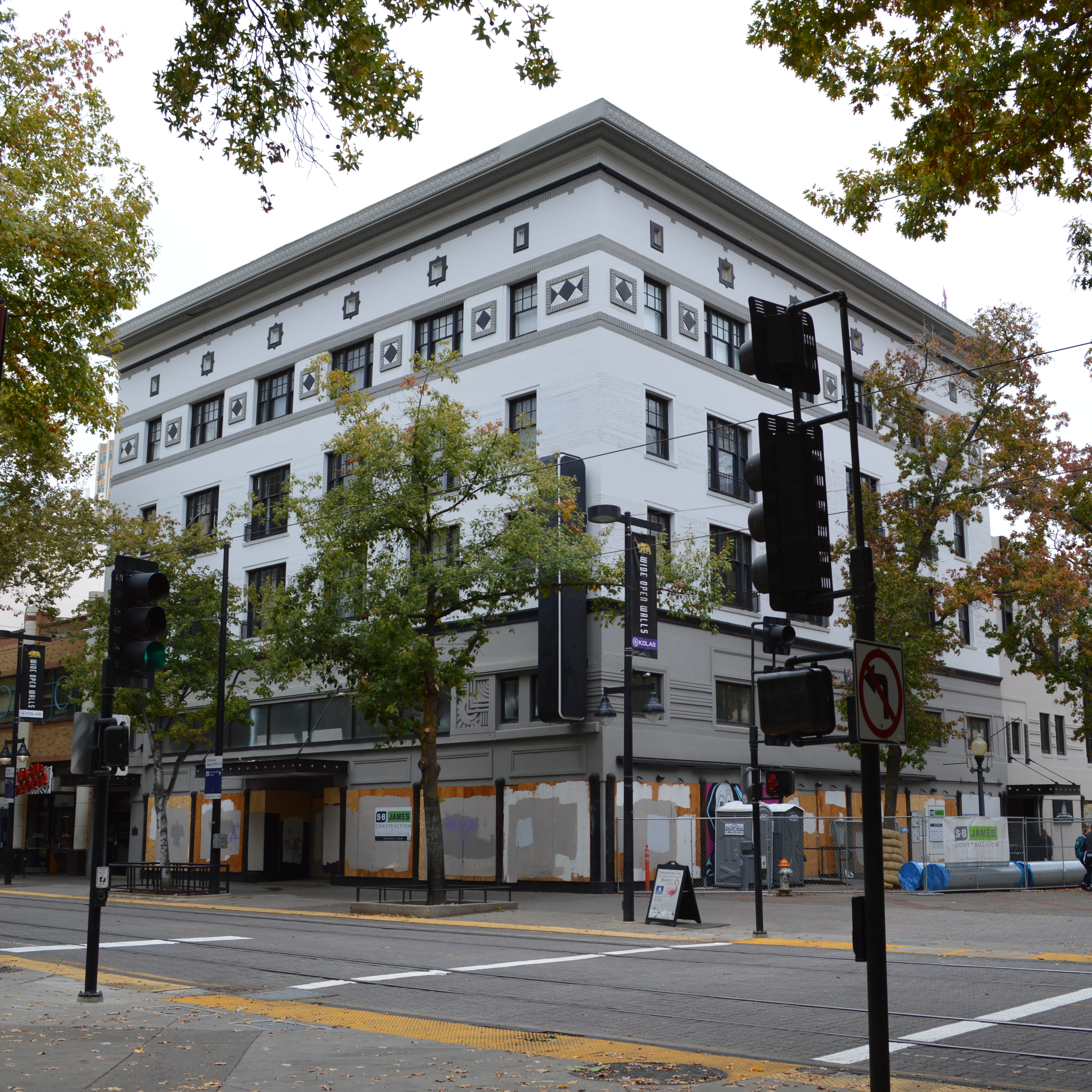

- Location within Sacramento, California Location within California Location within the United States
- Location: 1029 K St., Sacramento, California
- Coordinates: 38°34′45″N 121°29′34″W
- Area: .14 acres (0.057 ha)
- Built: 1911
- Architect: Seadler & Hoen; George Sellon; E.C. Hemmings
- Architectural style: Prairie School; Streamline Moderne
- NRHP reference No.: 100001385
- Added to NRHP: July 31, 2017

Mohr and Yoerk Market is a historic apartment building located in Sacramento, California constructed in 1911 in the Prairie School style. It is a 4 and a half story building with ground floor retail and apartments above. It was built to showcase the Mohr and Yoerk Market, which an early supermarket that combined meat products with a variety of foods from other departments, the first on the west coast.

== History ==
The original market building was designed by E.C. Hemmings. In 1912, the market decided to remodel the north half of the lot and constructed the 4 and half story building with apartments. This work was designed by architects Seadler and Hoen. The two buildings had differing designs, but remained the same height. The market closed in 1931 and the building was remodeled by former State Architect George Sellon, a prolific Sacramento architect, which shortened the 1912 remodeled building to 2 and half stories. He also successfully utilized Streamline Moderne motifs to unify the two buildings into an attractive combined image.

In 1933, the women's clothing store Bon Marche housed the ground floor. Ransohoff's department store purchased the building in 1956 and operated there until 1990. It has since been used as a supper club, a brewery, and an art gallery. In 2003, the apartments were renovated to accommodate office space.

== See also ==
- Sacramento, California
