= Midtown Sacramento =

Historical district in Sacramento

Coordinates: 38.5721°N 121.4828°W

Midtown Sacramento (commonly known as Midtown) is a historical district and neighborhood just east of Downtown Sacramento. Officially, Midtown's borders are R Street on the South, J Street on the North, 16th Street on the West and 30th Street on the East. However, the streets in Sacramento's original "grid" that are east of 16th Street cover the area commonly called "Midtown". This more general definition covers an area bounded by Broadway on the South, C street and the Southern Pacific rail lines on the North, 16th Street on the West and Alhambra Boulevard on the East.

It is a largely residential community with tree-lined streets and old Victorians. It is also the center of Sacramento's art, music, and cultural scene. Boutiques, bars, clubs, upscale, and casual dining abound. Midtown has the only winery located in the greater Sacramento urban area. Midtown hosts an art walk on the second Saturday of each month which attracts thousands of metropolitan residents. A large historic Asian community resides from S Street south to Broadway with a higher concentration between 3rd Street and 5th Streets, J Street and I Streets.

The Midtown community is diverse in terms of race and income brackets. Many legislators choose to live in various spots in Midtown when the California legislature is in session. Increasing in-fill developments consisting largely of upscale lofts have priced out some residents. Historic sites such as Sutter's Fort, the first European settlement in Sacramento, are located in Midtown. Midtown is known for being pedestrian-friendly and bike-friendly with continuous marked bike-lanes throughout the neighborhood and a bike path connecting to the American River Parkway which extends to Folsom. Public transit consists of Sacramento Regional Transit District light-rail lines running down R Street connecting the neighborhood to the metropolitan area and bus lines serving the central city area. A train station is expected to be constructed for Altamont Corridor Express and Gold Runner serviced by 2023.

== Lavender Heights ==
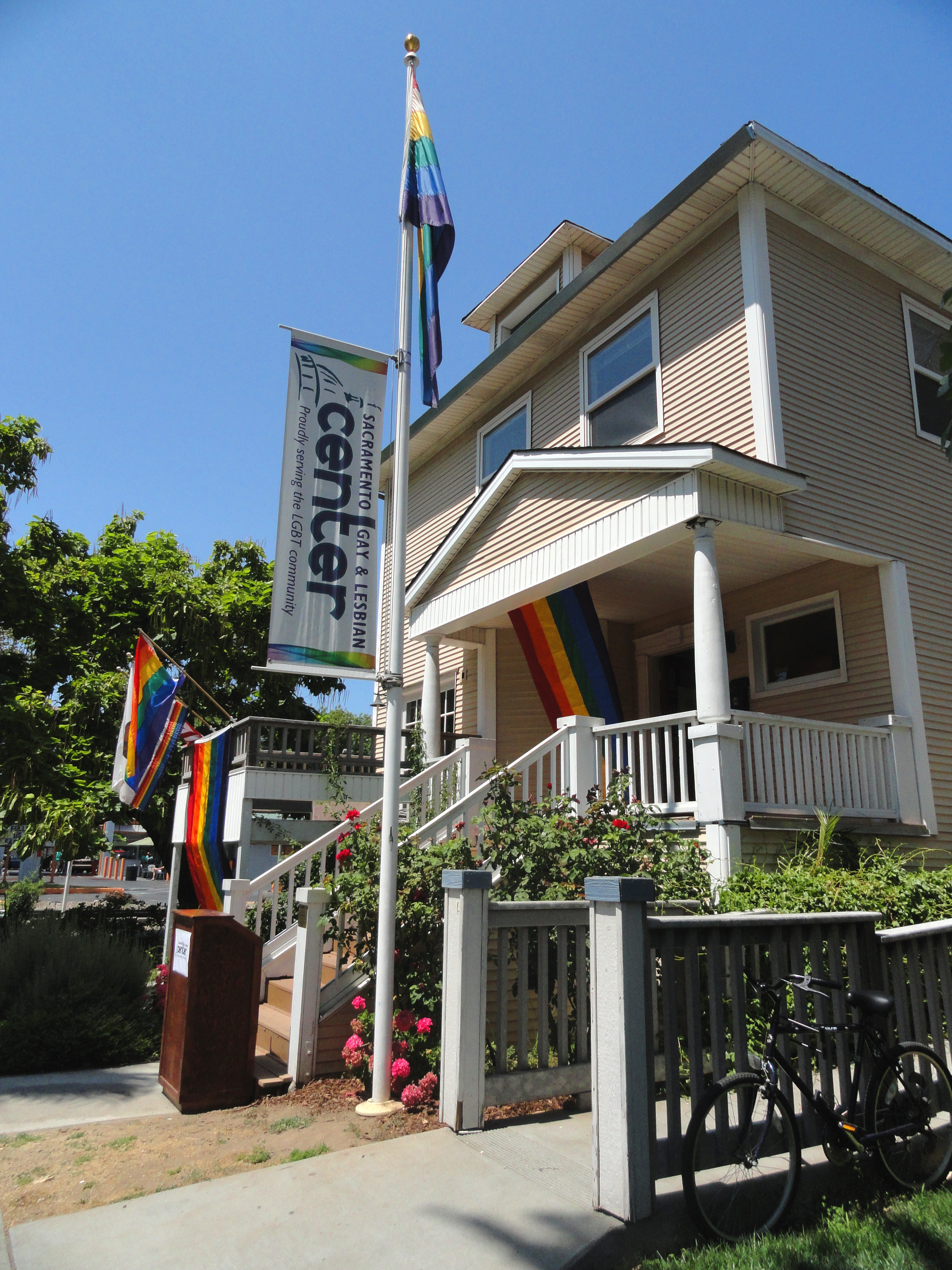
The Sacramento LGBT Community Center (formerly the Lambda Center), located in the Lavender Heights district.

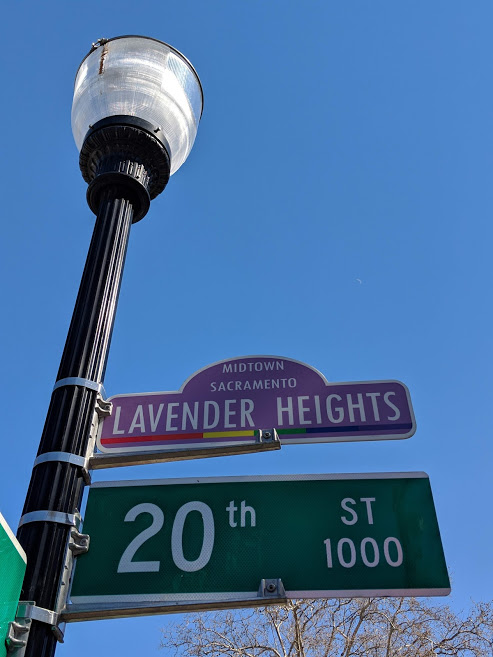
Lavender Heights Street Sign at 20th and J streets

Lavender Heights, Sacramento's gay and lesbian district, is centrally located on K Street and 20th Street. The area owes its name to the high number of gay-owned homes and businesses residing there.

Lavender Heights is a name given to the hub of Sacramento's gay and lesbian community with many gay bars and restaurants. It is considered Sacramento's equivalent to The Castro (San Francisco), West Hollywood (Los Angeles), Hillcrest (San Diego), and Dupont Circle (Washington D.C.) as the city's LGBT district. Community resources for the LGBT community in the area include the Sacramento LGBT Community Center (formerly the Lambda Center) and the Lavender Library. Most of the gay bars in Sacramento are located in the Lavender Heights area. Hate crimes and gay bashing have been an issue since the early 1990s in the area. A wave of "religious refugees" including "Slavic evangelicals" has added to the tensions; many were drawn to immigrate by Sacramento evangelical churches who sponsored them including the Assemblies of God Capital Christian Center.

The area is home to many of the city's music and arts festivals, including the Second Saturday Block Party from May to September. The neighborhood hosts a weekly farmer's market known as the Midtown Farmer's Market with local produce, art vendors and food stands every Saturday morning.

== See also ==
- Downtown Sacramento
- East Sacramento
