= McKinley Park, Sacramento =

Urban park in Sacramento, California

- McKinley Park
- U.S. National Register of Historic Places
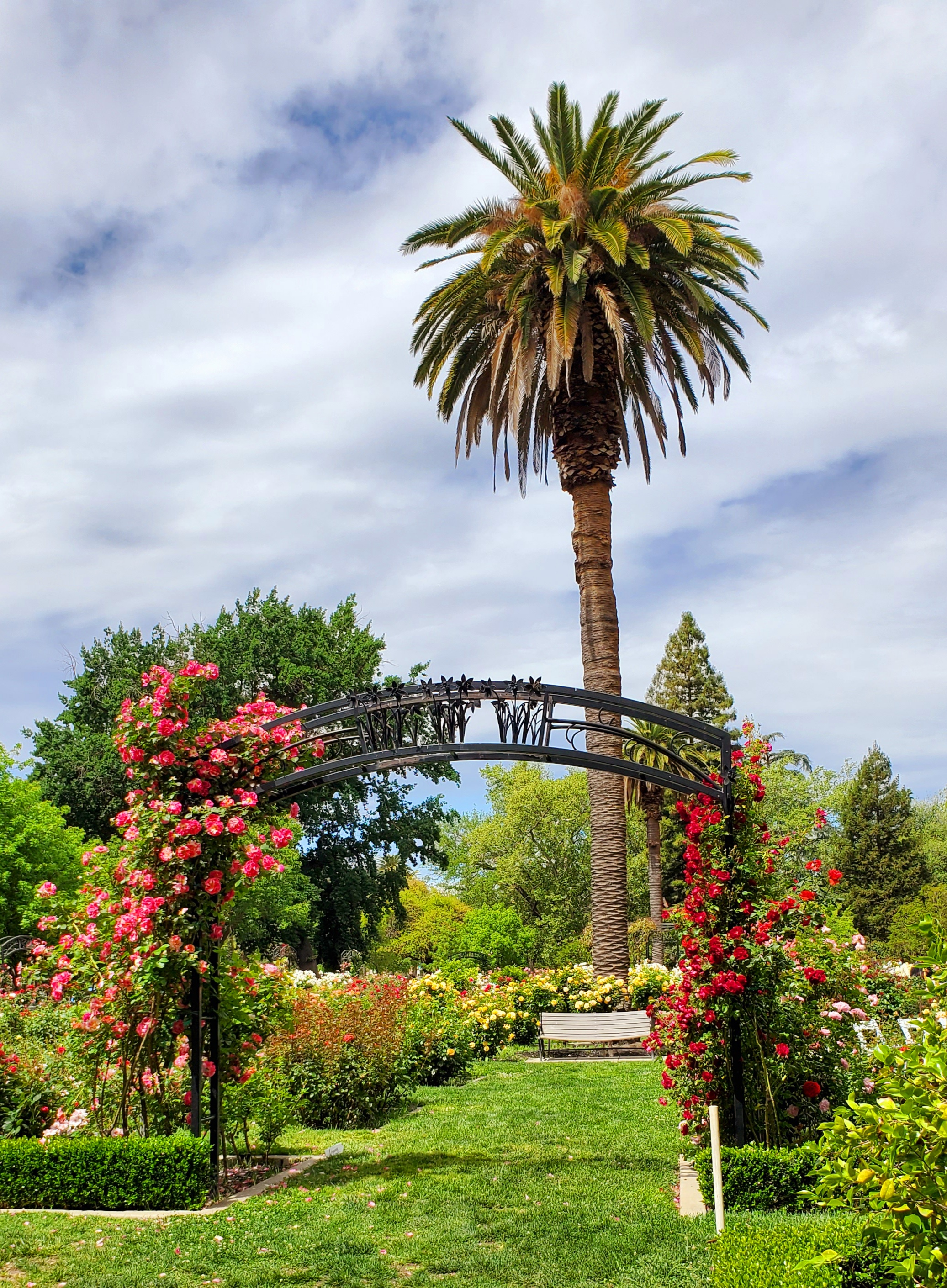

- Location within Sacramento, California Location within Northern California Location within California
- Location: H St. & Alhambra Blvd. Sacramento, California
- Coordinates: 38.5751°N 121.4634°W
- NRHP reference No.: 100003036
- Added to NRHP: October 18, 2018

McKinley Park is a historically significant city park located in Sacramento, California. The Sacramento Street Railway Company built the park in 1871 to attract passengers to its line and the park continues to serve as both a recreational area and a gathering spot for residents of the greater Sacramento area.

== Early history ==
The Sacramento Street Railway Company purchased land near the Sacramento city limits in 1871. Hoping to attract customers, they turned the area into a park. This endeavor was a success, and suburban growth soon followed and made the area more developed. One of the earliest events held at the park was a social dance held on January 21, 1872. Picnics were extremely popular during this time, so predictably many of these were held in the park. Churches and other organizations would organize these events at the park, with the Sacramento Record Union reporting that there were seventeen picnics to be held in a five-week period during April and May 1883. The park was purchased from the company by the city of Sacramento in 1902 and renamed from East Park to McKinley Park to honor President William McKinley following his assassination in 1901. The park was also annexed into the city of Sacramento at this time.

== Modern use ==
As of 2021, the park is a staple in the Sacramento community. It is over 32 acres (13 ha) in size and includes basketball and tennis courts, soccer fields, and a rose garden. The rose garden, created in 1928, often holds weddings and other events. The park also is host to a $1.5 million playground, which was created after the prior playground (built in 1976) burned down in a 2012 accident. The park also contains a lake, named Lake Keisel after Frederick Keisel, the son of one of the Sacramento Street Railway Company owners. In the 1920s, the lake hosted an alligator exhibit. The lake was renovated in 1988, with an island being added for ducks and geese to nest in. An additional renovation in 2017 improved the lake's water quality. The park was officially listed on the National Register of Historic Places on October 18, 2018.

In 2017, city officials planned for a sewage tank to be constructed directly below the park in an effort to reduce flooding. The plan also involved the demolition of the park's baseball diamond, first installed in 1927, which was set to be replaced with a multi-use soccer field. A group of citizens sued the city over the construction in an effort to protect the park's historic baseball diamond and six trees. The lawsuit failed, allowing the sewage tank project to begin construction in 2019.
