= Alhambra Theatre (Sacramento) =

Coordinates: 38.57186°N 121.46489°W

- Motto: The Showplace of Sacramento
- Interactive map of Alhambra Theatre
- Address: Sacramento, California
- Capacity: 1990
- Type: Film

Construction
- Opened: 1927
- Demolished: 1973
- Alhambra Theatre
- Formerly listed on the U.S. National Register of Historic Places
- NRHP reference No.: 73002250

Significant dates
- Added to NRHP: 1973
- Removed from NRHP: 1973

The Alhambra Theatre opened in 1927 and was the preeminent movie house in the greater Sacramento area for many years. It was designed in the Moorish style of the great Spanish cities and included a large courtyard and fountain. The interior was lavishly appointed with red carpet, gold trim, and large pillars. It was located directly beyond the eastern terminus of K Street at 1025 Thirty-First Street, now Alhambra Boulevard, Sacramento, California 95816, in the East Sacramento neighborhood.

The theatre was designed by Starks and Flanders, a firm which was founded in Sacramento by New Yorker Leonard Starks in 1922 and designed many other important structures, including the Fox-Senator Theatre, the Elks Building, C. K. McClatchy High School, and the downtown post office.

The theatre was also home to the Alhambra Pipe Organ, an organ of fifteen ranks built by the Robert Morton Organ Company in 1927. After it was removed in 1960, the instrument was used by the First Baptist Church in Stockton and now resides with the Kautz family at Ironstone Vineyards.

In 1973, a bond measure intended to allow the City of Sacramento to purchase the theatre failed to pass, and the Alhambra was demolished to make way for a Safeway supermarket. An original fountain is still intact and functioning on the south side of the Safeway parking lot. The destruction of the theatre, which was opposed by the public, awakened a preservation movement in Sacramento that remains active today and has adopted “Remember the Alhambra” as a slogan.

== Gallery ==
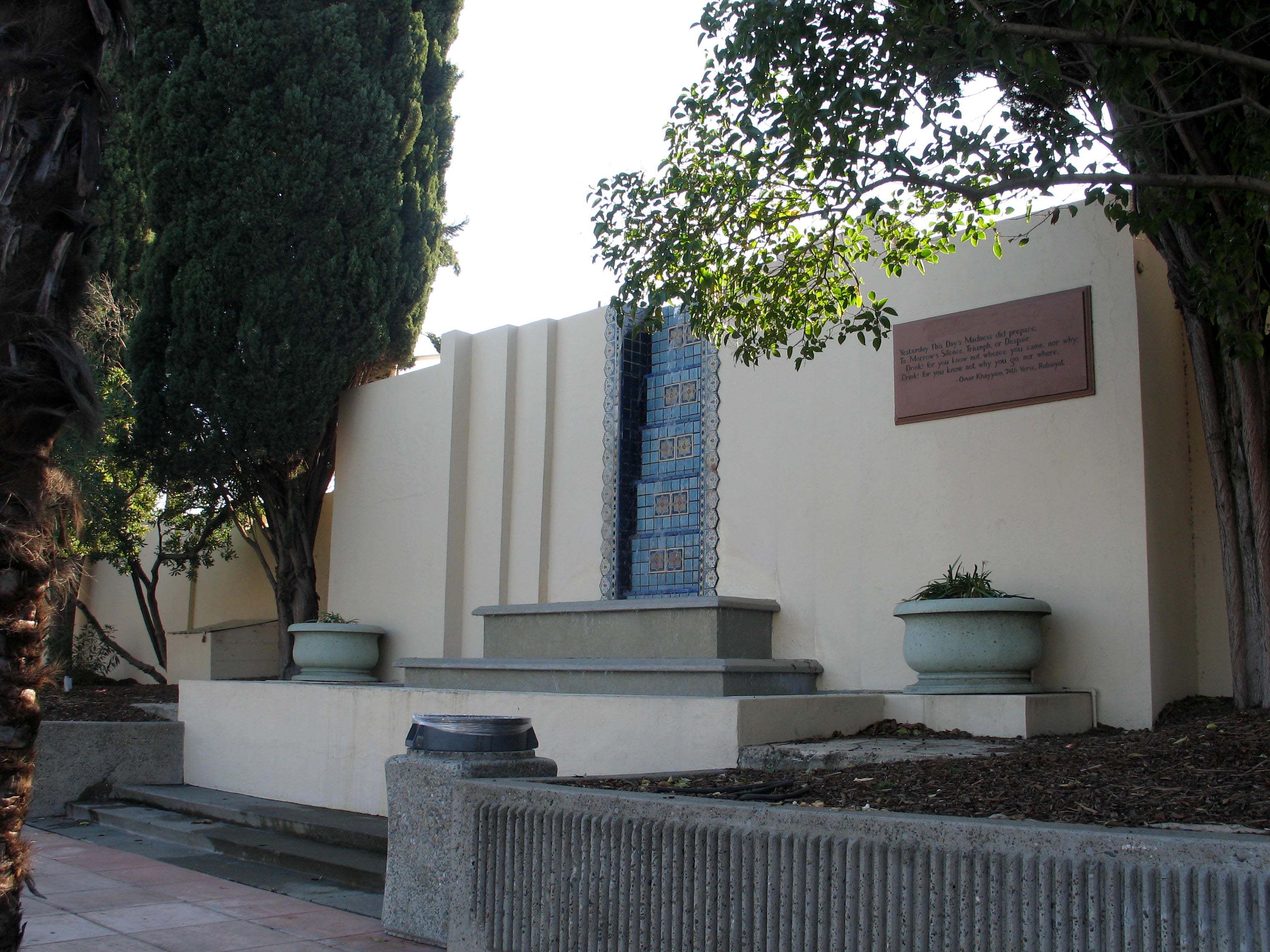
Surviving Alhambra Theatre Fountain, Sacramento, California

== See also ==
- Crest Theatre
- Tower Theatre
