= 7th & Capitol and 8th & Capitol stations =

SacRT light rail stations

7th & Capitol 8th & Capitol
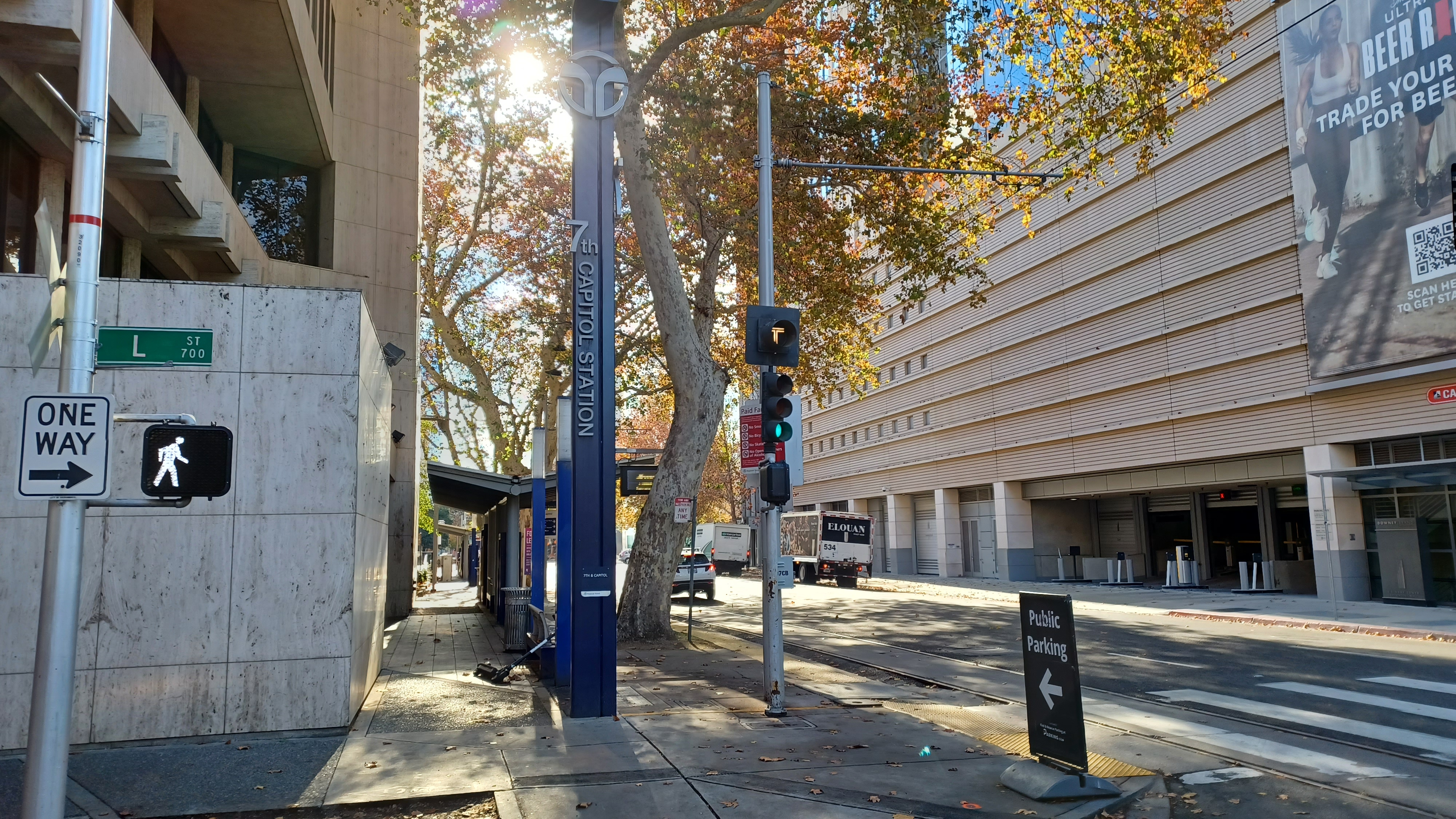
- 7th & Capitol station (southbound) platform in December 2021

General information
- Location: 7th Street and Capitol Mall; 8th Street and Capitol Mall; Sacramento, California; United States
- Coordinates: 38°34′40″N 121°29′53″W
- Owner: Sacramento Regional Transit District
- Platforms: 2 split side platforms
- Tracks: 2
- Connections: Sacramento Regional Transit: 11, 30, 38, 51, 62, 86, 88, 102, 103, 106, 107, 109, 129, 134, 142 (Airport Express), E10, E11, E12, E13, E14, E15, E16, E17, E18; North Natomas Jibe; Roseville Transit: 1, 2, 3, 4, 5, 6, 7, 8, 9, 10; Yolobus: 42A, 42B, 43, 43R, 230

Construction
- Structure type: At-grade, one-way couplet
- Accessible: Yes

History
- Opened: March 12, 1987

Services
Preceding station	SacRT	Following station
8th & Capitol
St. Rose of Lima Park toward Watt/I-80	Blue Line	8th & O One-way operation
8th & K toward Sacramento Valley Station	Gold Line	8th & O One-way operation
8th & K toward 7th & Richards/Township 9	Green Line	8th & O One-way operation
7th & Capitol
Cathedral Square One-way operation	Blue Line	8th & O toward Cosumnes River College
7th & I One-way operation	Gold Line	8th & O toward Historic Folsom
7th & I One-way operation	Green Line	8th & O toward 13th Street
Proposed services
Preceding station	SacRT	Following station
8th & Capitol
8th & K toward Sacramento Valley Station	Sacramento Streetcar	N Street Platform; One-way operation
7th & Capitol
7th & I One-way operation	Sacramento Streetcar	N Street Platform toward Sutter Health Park
Location

7th & Capitol and 8th & Capitol stations are a pair of Sacramento Regional Transit District light rail stations, served by all three SacRT light rail lines: Blue, Gold and Green. It is located in Downtown Sacramento at the intersection of Capitol Mall and 7th Street (south platform) and 8th Street (north platform) and within walking distance of the California State Capitol, Tower Bridge, Golden 1 Center, and Sutter Health Park. Also, it is the westernmost station served by all three lines where transfers can be made between the Blue Line and the Gold and Green Lines.

This is a primary light rail station for the Golden 1 Center, home of the NBA's Sacramento Kings and other events. The previous station, the 7th & K platform of St. Rose of Lima Park, was closed permanently in 2016 to improve traffic and pedestrian flow for 7th Street. The station underwent upgrades in 2016 to accommodate the increased ridership from the arena, receiving improved safety, security, signage, communication, and lighting fixtures.

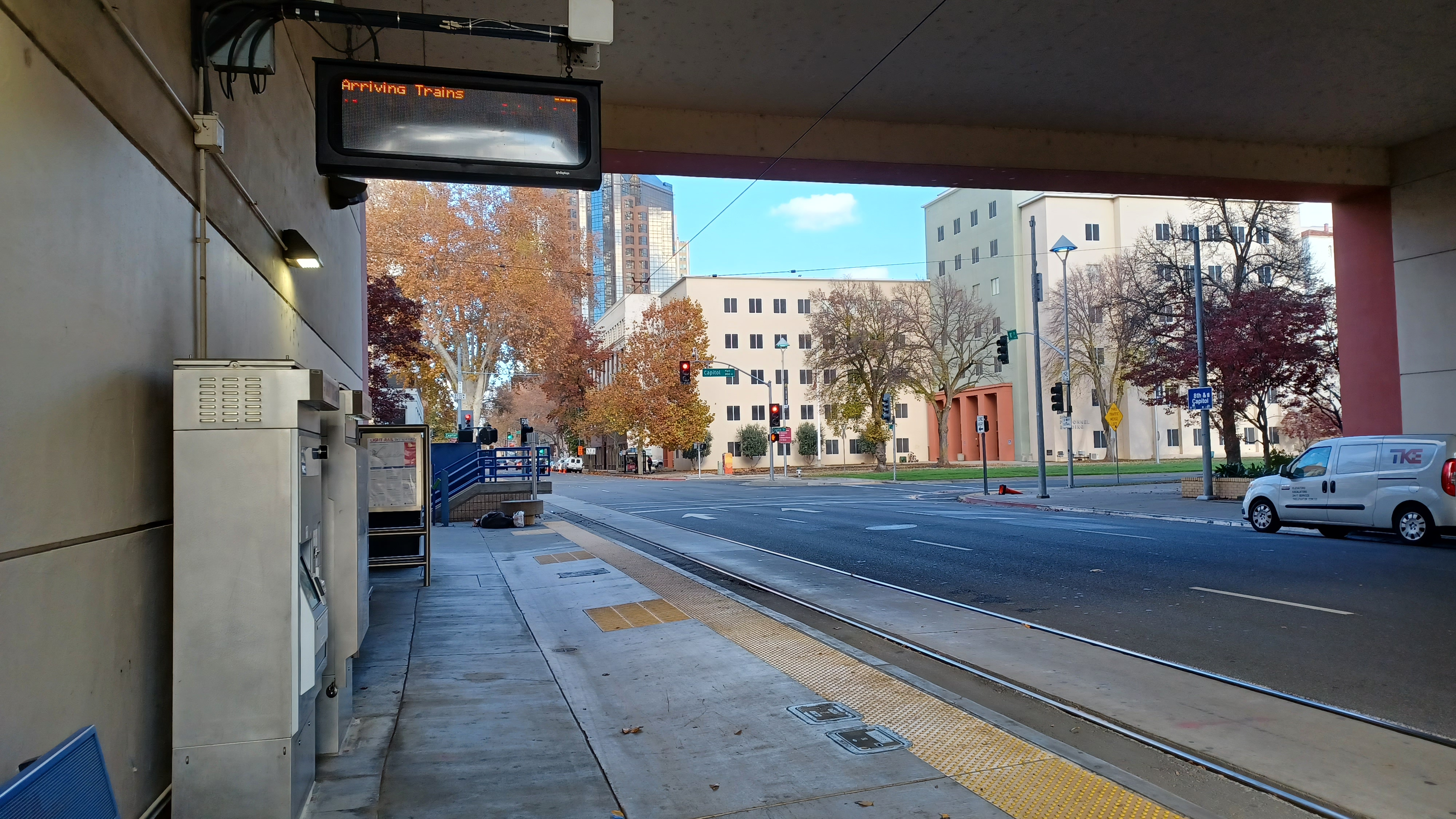
8th & Capitol station (northbound) platform in December 2021. The Employment Development Department headquarters building crosses over the platform.

== See also ==
- Sacramento Regional Transit District
