= 8th & K station =

American rail station

8th & K
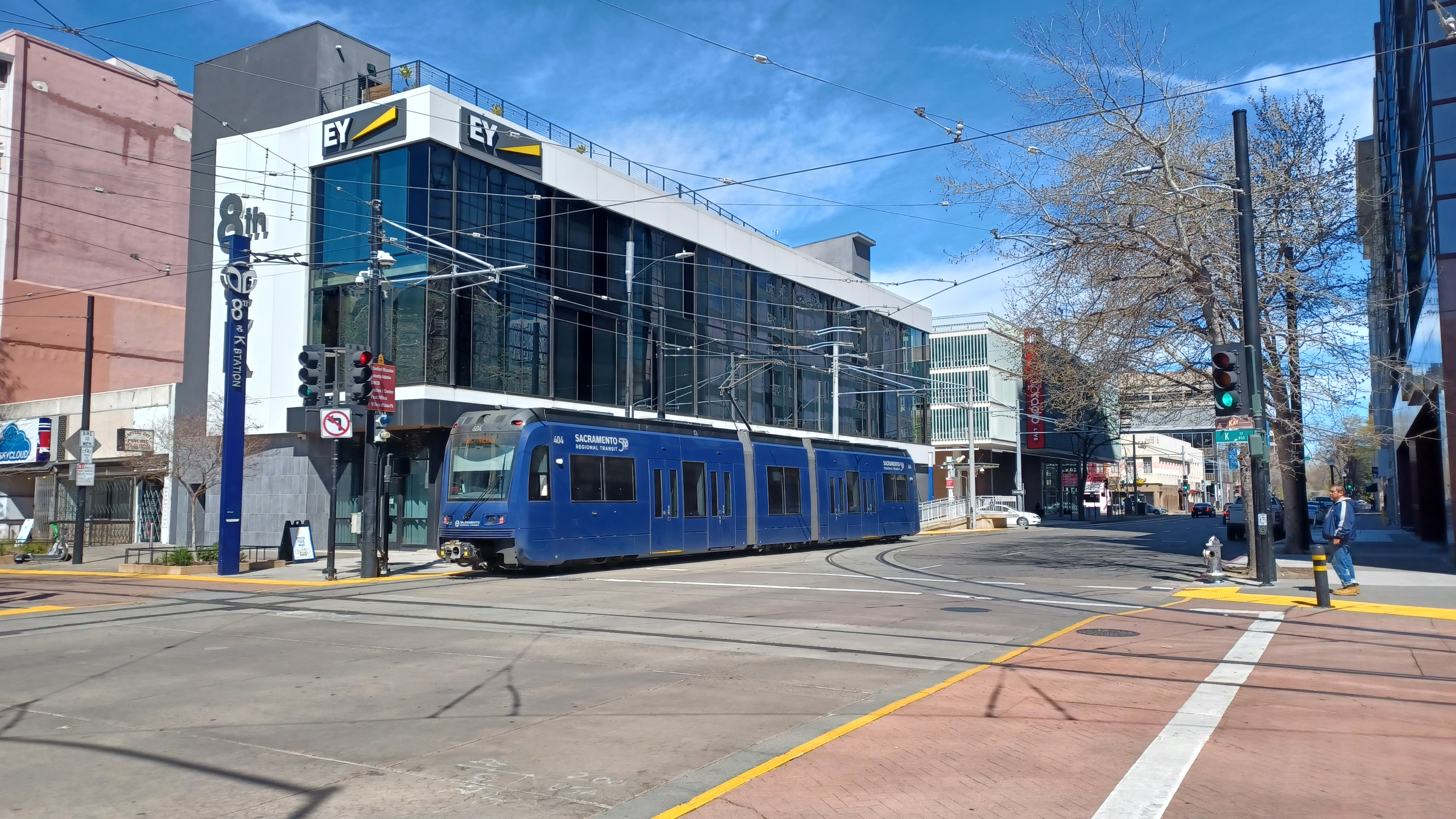
- Station at the intersection of 8th & K Streets

General information
- Location: 8th Street & K Street; Sacramento, California; United States
- Coordinates: 38°34′49″N 121°29′48″W
- Owner: Sacramento Regional Transit District
- Platforms: 1 side platform
- Tracks: 1
- Connections: Sacramento Regional Transit: 30, 38, 62, 86, 88, 142 (Airport Express); North Natomas Jibe; Yolobus: 42A, 42B, 43, 43R, 230

Construction
- Structure type: At-grade
- Accessible: Yes

History
- Opened: December 8, 2006; 19 years ago

Services
Preceding station	SacRT	Following station
8th & H toward Sacramento Valley Station	Gold Line	8th & Capitol One-way operation
8th & H toward 7th & Richards/Township 9	Green Line	8th & Capitol One-way operation
Location

8th & K station is a northbound-only SacRT light rail station in Downtown Sacramento, California. The station was built as part of the 2007 extension of the light rail system to Sacramento Valley Station. The station is located one block away from the St. Rose of Lima Park station, served by northbound Blue Line trains. There was previously a southbound station at 7th & K, but it was closed due to its close proximity to the 7th & Capitol station.

8th & K station serves the Golden 1 Center, nearby downtown office buildings and Downtown Commons (formerly Downtown Plaza), an entertainment and shopping complex that anchors the arena.

== See also ==
- Sacramento Regional Transit District
