= 8th & O station =

Light rail station in California

8th & O
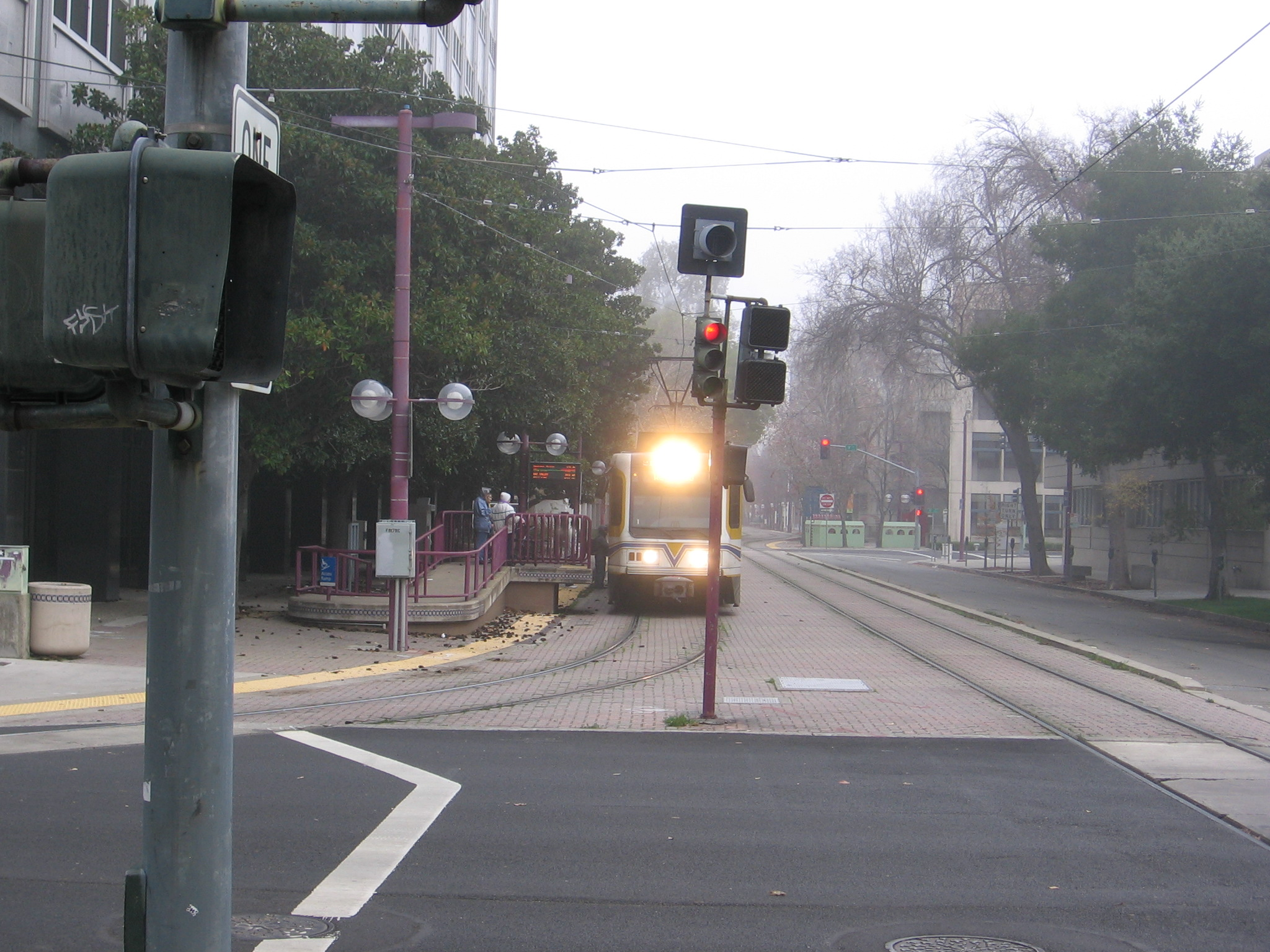
- 8th & O station northbound platform as seen from the southbound platform

General information
- Location: 8th Street at O Street; Sacramento, California; United States
- Coordinates: 38°34′32″N 121°29′55″W
- Owner: Sacramento Regional Transit District
- Platforms: 2 split side platforms
- Tracks: 2
- Connections: Sacramento Regional Transit: 11, 51, 102, 103, 106, 107, 109, E10, E11, E12, E13, E14, E15, E16, E17, E18; North Natomas Jibe; Yolobus: 42A, 42B, 43, 43R, 230

Construction
- Accessible: Yes

History
- Opened: March 12, 1987; 39 years ago

Services
Preceding station	SacRT	Following station
8th & Capitol toward Watt/I-80	Blue Line	Archives Plaza toward Cosumnes River College
7th & Capitol One-way operation	Blue Line	Archives Plaza toward Cosumnes River College
8th & Capitol toward Sacramento Valley Station	Gold Line	Archives Plaza toward Historic Folsom
7th & Capitol One-way operation	Gold Line	Archives Plaza toward Historic Folsom
8th & Capitol toward 7th & Richards/Township 9	Green Line	Archives Plaza toward 13th Street
7th & Capitol One-way operation	Green Line	Archives Plaza toward 13th Street
Location

8th & O station is a split light rail station in the SacRT light rail system, served by all three lines: Blue, Gold and Green Lines. It is located at the intersection of 8th and O Streets in Downtown Sacramento, California, United States, with the split platforms located on each side of 8th Street where the line splits into one-way couplets. The station is near the historical and cultural district of the city.

On July 15, 2022, the station's west platform (for trains traveling toward the 8th and Capitol Station) was closed to allow major renovation construction of the California Department of Water Resources building, located at 1416 9th Street. The platform remained closed for four years, reopening on July 13, 2026.
