= St. Rose of Lima Park station =

Railway station in California

St. Rose of Lima Park (9th & K)
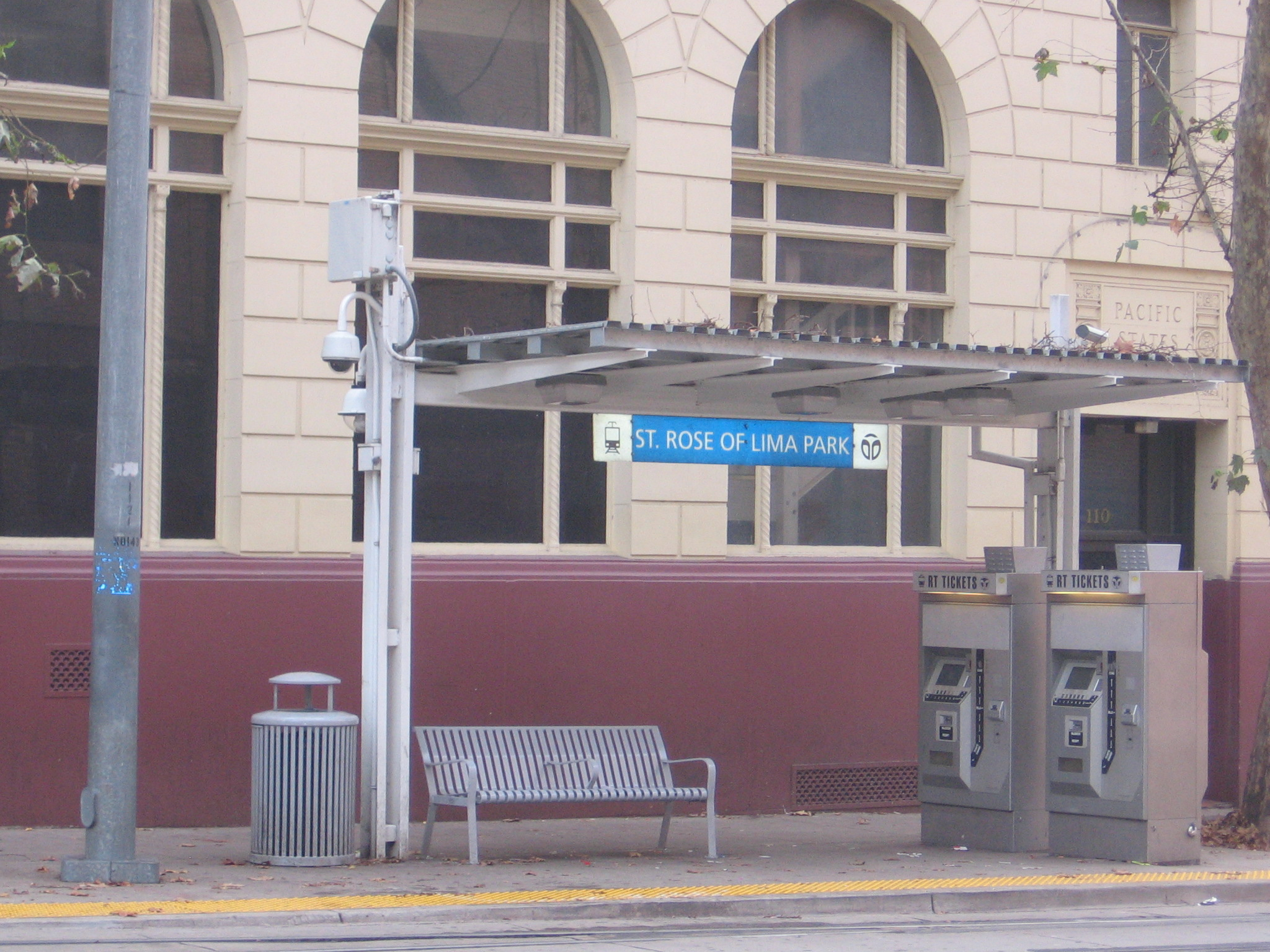
- St. Rose of Lima Park station platform, December 2012

General information
- Location: K Street & 9th Street; Sacramento, California; United States
- Coordinates: 38.57778°N 121.49806°W
- Owner: Sacramento Regional Transit District
- Connections: Sacramento Regional Transit District: 30, 38, 62, 86, 88, 142 (Airport Express); North Natomas Jibe; Yolobus: 42A, 42B, 43, 43R, 230

Construction
- Accessible: Yes

History
- Opened: March 12, 1987; 39 years ago
- Closed: September 30, 2016; 9 years ago (7th & K)

Services
Preceding station	SacRT	Following station
Cathedral Square toward Watt/I-80	Blue Line	8th & Capitol One-way operation
Former services (7th & K)
Preceding station	SacRT	Following station
Cathedral Square One-way operation	Blue Line	7th & Capitol toward Cosumnes River College
7th & I One-way operation	Gold Line	7th & Capitol toward Historic Folsom
7th & I One-way operation	Green Line	7th & Capitol toward 13th Street
Location

St. Rose of Lima Park is a split SacRT light rail station, located near the park named in honor of Rose of Lima, in Downtown Sacramento, California. The northbound platform is located at the intersection of 9th & K Streets, and the former southbound platform was located at 7th & K Streets. When RT expanded the light rail system in 2007 to serve Sacramento Valley Station, it added 8th & K station in the block between the stations.

The 9th & K platform is served by the Blue Line only. It serves the Golden 1 Center, nearby downtown office buildings and Downtown Commons (formerly Downtown Plaza), an entertainment and shopping complex that anchors the arena.

== Closure of 7th & K ==
The original southbound 7th & K station platform was built in 1987, and was located on K Street between 7th and 8th Streets. It was moved in 2010 to its current location on 7th Street south of K Street, just around the corner of the same block. It was served by all three RT light rail lines at the time, although only the Blue Line originally served the platform before the relocation. Despite the "new" 7th & K station being across the street from the new Golden 1 Center, it was one block north of the 7th & Capitol station platform. RT officials deemed the location too close to another light rail station, and also considered the design inadequate due to being on a slope in the block. So after extensive feedback, the 7th & Capitol platform was closed from 2015 to 2016 for renovations, also to handle passenger loads for the Sacramento Kings home games at Golden 1 Center. When that station reopened, 7th & K was closed permanently on September 30, 2016.

== See also ==
- Sacramento Regional Transit District
