= Archives Plaza station =

Light rail station in Sacramento, California, United States

Archives Plaza
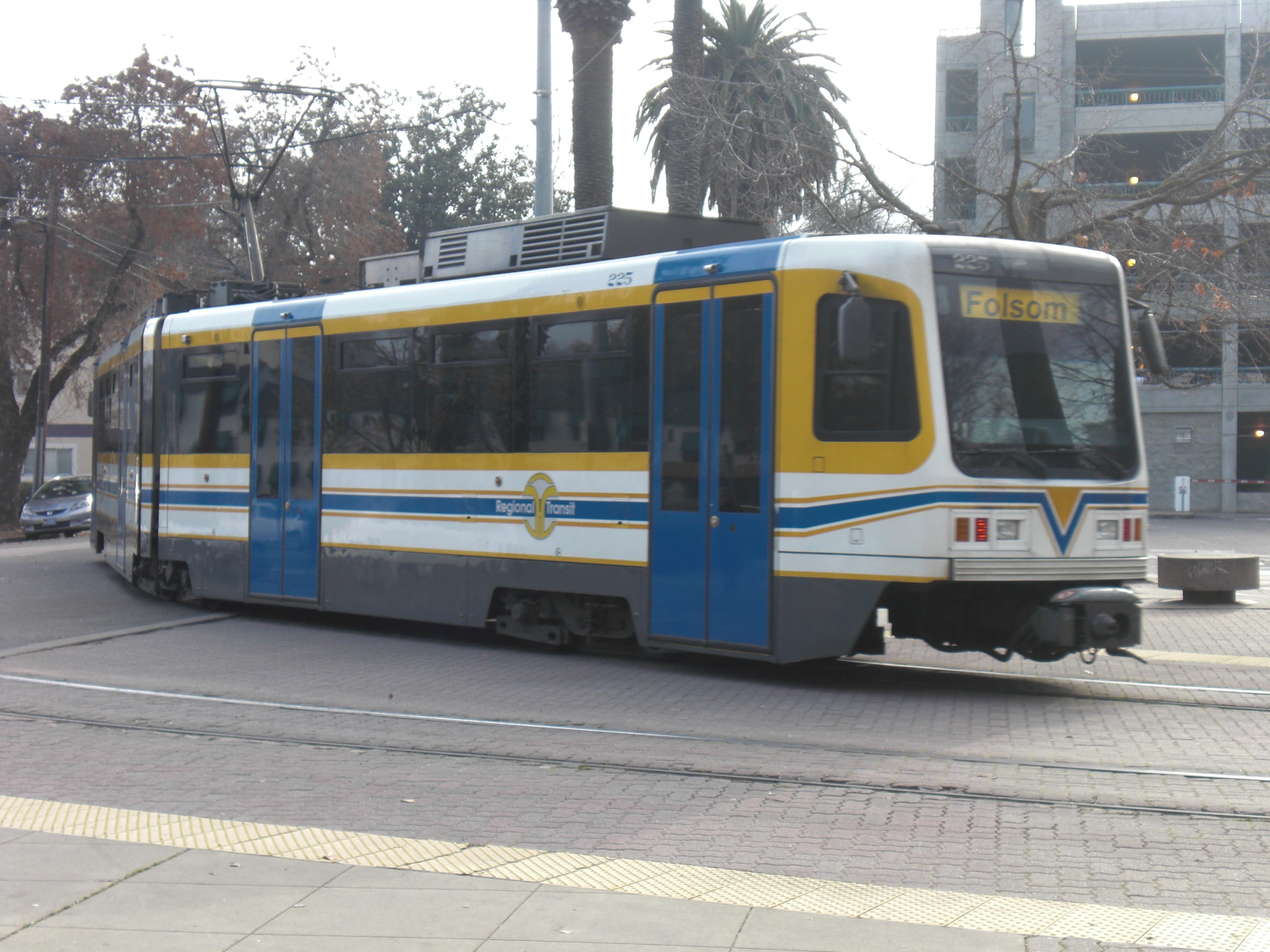
- Train departs Archives Plaza station

General information
- Location: 11th Street and O Street; Sacramento, California; United States
- Coordinates: 38°34′29″N 121°29′43″W
- Owner: Sacramento Regional Transit District
- Platforms: 2 side platforms
- Tracks: 2

Construction
- Structure type: At-grade
- Accessible: Yes

History
- Opened: March 12, 1987; 39 years ago

Services
Preceding station	SacRT	Following station
8th & O toward Watt/I-80	Blue Line	13th Street toward Cosumnes River College
8th & O toward Sacramento Valley Station	Gold Line	13th Street toward Historic Folsom
8th & O toward 7th & Richards/Township 9	Green Line	13th Street Terminus
Location

Archives Plaza station is a side platformed SacRT light rail station in Downtown Sacramento, California, United States. The station was opened on September 5, 1987, and is operated by the Sacramento Regional Transit District. It is served by all three light rail lines: Gold, Blue and Green Lines. The station is located along O Street between 10th and 12th Streets. Several state government buildings surround the station, including the California State Archives at the intersection of O and 12th Streets, and the California State Capitol one block north along 11th Street.

== Notable places nearby ==
The station is within walking distance of the following notable places:

- California State Archives
- California State Capitol
- California Department of Developmental Services
- California Department of Food and Agriculture
- California Department of Transportation
- California Department of Veterans Affairs
- The California Museum
- California State Capitol Museum
- Capitol Park
- Secretary of State of California
