= 7th & Railyards station =

Light rail station in Sacramento, California, US

7th & Railyards
- 7th & Railyards station facing south. Downtown Sacramento can be seen in the background.

General information
- Location: Railyards Boulevard and 7th Street; Sacramento, California; United States
- Coordinates: 38°35′23″N 121°29′38″W
- Owner: Sacramento Regional Transit District
- Platforms: 1 side platform
- Tracks: 1

Construction
- Structure type: At-grade
- Accessible: Yes

History
- Opened: October 15, 2026

Services
Preceding station	SacRT	Following station
7th & Richards/Township 9 Terminus	Green Line	8th & H/County Center One-way operation
7th & Richards/Township 9 Terminus	Green Line	7th & I/County Center toward 13th Street
Location

7th & Railyards station is a SacRT light rail station in Sacramento, California, served by the Green Line. Located at the intersection of 7th Street and Railyards Boulevard, north of downtown, the station has a single side platform on the line's single track, allowing trains in either direction to use it. It was built as an infill station to serve the Sacramento Railyards development between downtown and the River District, including the Republic FC Stadium, scheduled to open in 2028.

Construction began in 2025 and required the Green Line to be suspended during the work. The station was initially expected to open in September 2026. The opening was later delayed until October 15, 2026, to allow for final testing and operator training.
