= Sutter Health Park =

Baseball park in West Sacramento, California

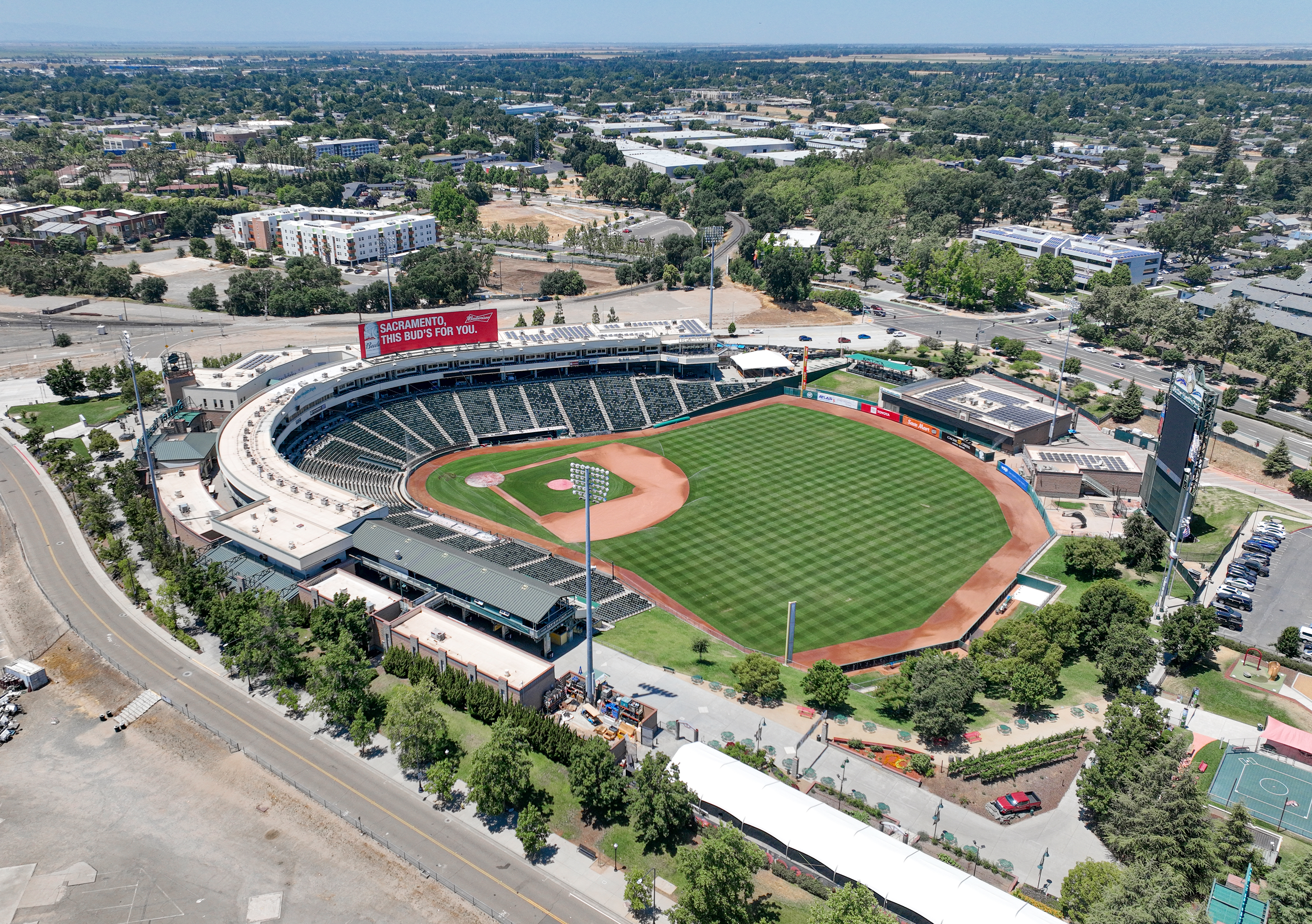
- Sutter Health Park in 2023

- Location within California Location within the United States
- Interactive map of Sutter Health Park
- Former names: Raley Field (2000–2019)
- Address: 400 Ballpark Drive; West Sacramento, California, U.S.
- Coordinates: 38°34′49.34″N 121°30′49.68″W
- Elevation: 20 feet (6 m) AMSL
- Owner: River City Regional Stadium Financing Authority
- Operator: River City Stadium Management, LLC
- Capacity: 10,624 (Fixed seats); 14,014 (Total, including fixed seats, lawn and standing room)
- Surface: Natural grass
- Field size: Left: 330 ft (100 m); Left center: 380 ft (120 m); Center: 403 ft (123 m); Right center: 380 ft (120 m); Right: 325 ft (99 m); Backstop: 58 ft (18 m)
- Public transit: Sacramento Valley Station; Sacramento Regional Transit Blue Line Gold Line Green Line at 7th & Capitol / 8th & Capitol

Construction
- Groundbreaking: October 28, 1999
- Opened: May 15, 2000
- Cost: $46.5 million ($86.9 million in 2025)
- Architect: HNTB
- Project manager: Cordell Corp.
- Services engineers: Frank M. Booth, Inc.
- General contractor: JR Roberts Corporation

Tenants
- Sacramento River Cats (PCL) 2000–present Sacramento Mountain Lions (UFL) 2012; Athletics (MLB) 2025–present

Website
- sutterhealthpark.com

Sutter Health Park is a ballpark in West Sacramento, California, directly adjacent to downtown Sacramento. It is the home of the minor league Sacramento River Cats of the Pacific Coast League (PCL) and the temporary home of the Athletics of Major League Baseball (MLB). While serving as home of the Athletics, it is currently the smallest ballpark in MLB by capacity. Known as Raley Field from 2000 to 2019, the facility was built on the site of old warehouses and rail yards, across the Sacramento River from the state capitol building.

== History ==
Minor league baseball was previously played in Sacramento at Edmonds Field (1910–60) and Hughes Stadium (1974–76), both hosting the Solons. With ground broken in October 1999, the new $46.5 million stadium was estimated to take about two years to build, but ended up being finished in less than nine months. However, the finishing-out of the stadium was delayed about forty-five days by extended periods of bad weather in the spring of 2000, overlapping the beginning of the 2000 season and forcing the River Cats to play a season-opening month-long road trip. The River Cats' home opener was played on May 15, 2000.

The stadium is one of the few professional sports facilities in the nation built without a public sector contribution. Although constructed using bonds financed by the River City Stadium Financing Authority, bond payments are paid from ticket, concession, advertising, and other revenues, not taxes. Because the $46.5 million project cost was too large for the host city to finance, Christopher Cabaldon, in his first term as mayor of West Sacramento, recruited Sacramento County and Yolo County to join his city in a joint-powers agency which became the stadium financing authority.

The stadium has 10,624 permanent seats and grass berms in both right and left fields for a total capacity of 14,014. Its original capacity was 14,611, but was decreased to 14,414 in 2005 with the addition of a party deck, and further decreased in 2010 with the opening of the Diamond Club behind home plate. The stadium has 2,798 club seats and 750 seats in 36 suites.

The initial naming rights for the facility were sold to Raley's, a regional chain of supermarkets based in West Sacramento, for $15 million over 20 years.

The ballpark hosted the 2005 Triple-A All-Star Game in which the Pacific Coast League All-Stars defeated the International League All-Stars, 11–5.

There was discussion of the Sacramento Mountain Lions, an American football team in the United Football League, using the field during the 2012 season. A final agreement to this effect was announced on August 6, 2012. The UFL, including the Mountain Lions, abruptly shut down operations in the middle of the 2012 season.

On July 18, 2013, Raley Field hosted a soccer match, a friendly featuring Mexican side Dorados de Sinaloa and Premier League side Norwich City F.C. The game finished 3–0 to Norwich, with goals from Luciano Becchio, Anthony Pilkington and Josh Murphy. The match's attendance was 14,014.

As part of the Golden State Hockey Rush, Raley Field hosted a minor league hockey game between the Stockton Heat and the Bakersfield Condors of the American Hockey League on December 18, 2015.

The ballpark was renamed Sutter Health Park after the 2019 season as part of a naming rights agreement with Sacramento-based Sutter Health.

=== Temporary home of the Athletics ===
On April 4, 2024, it was announced that the Athletics of Major League Baseball (MLB) will play at Sutter Health Park from 2025 through 2027, with an option for a fourth year pending the team's move to Las Vegas. They are expected to move into their new stadium in Las Vegas by 2028.

The ballpark underwent major renovations for the Athletics, including improved stadium video displays, audio enhancements, technology to maintain the grass surface, new weight rooms and training facilities, a new home clubhouse behind the left field wall, and upgraded premium clubs and seating for spectators.

The Sacramento River Cats will continue to play at the ballpark, playing home games while the A's are away and vice versa.

On March 31, 2025, the Athletics played their first home game at the stadium against the Chicago Cubs, falling 18-3 with Cubs' catcher Carson Kelly hitting for the cycle in front of 12,192 fans.

Should the Las Vegas stadium be completed on time, the final Athletics home game at the stadium and in California will be on September 26, 2027 against the Seattle Mariners.

== Gallery ==
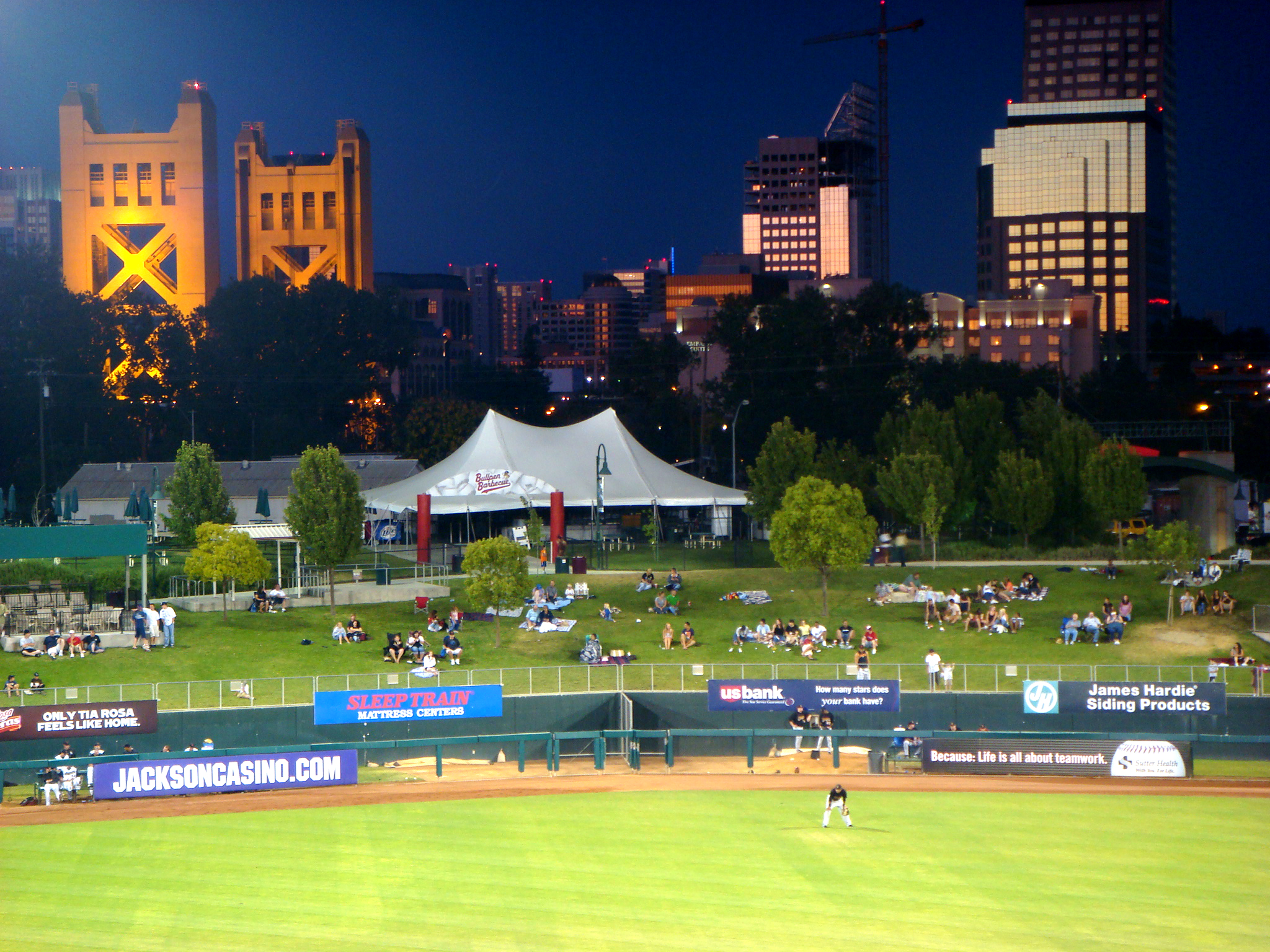
View of the city skyline from the grandstand

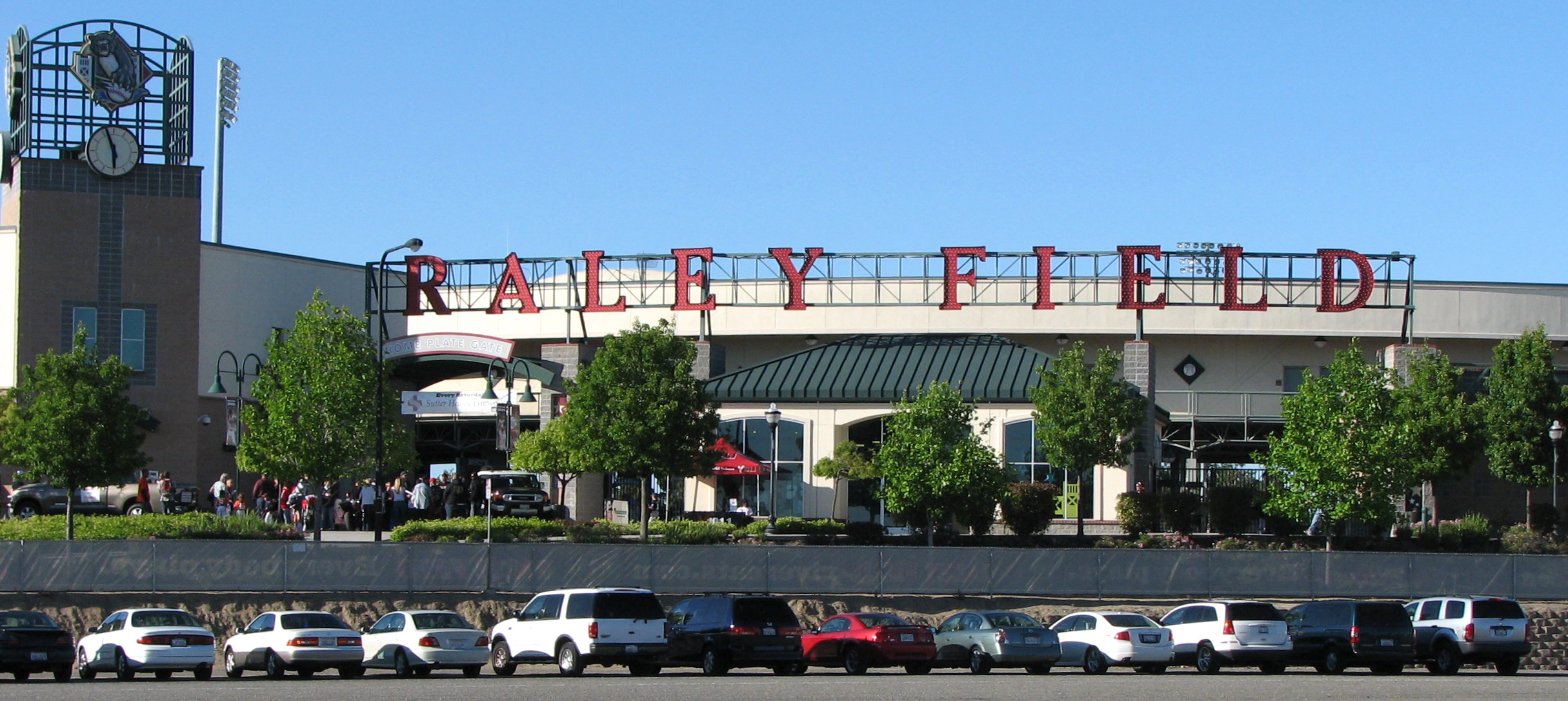
Entrance during the day

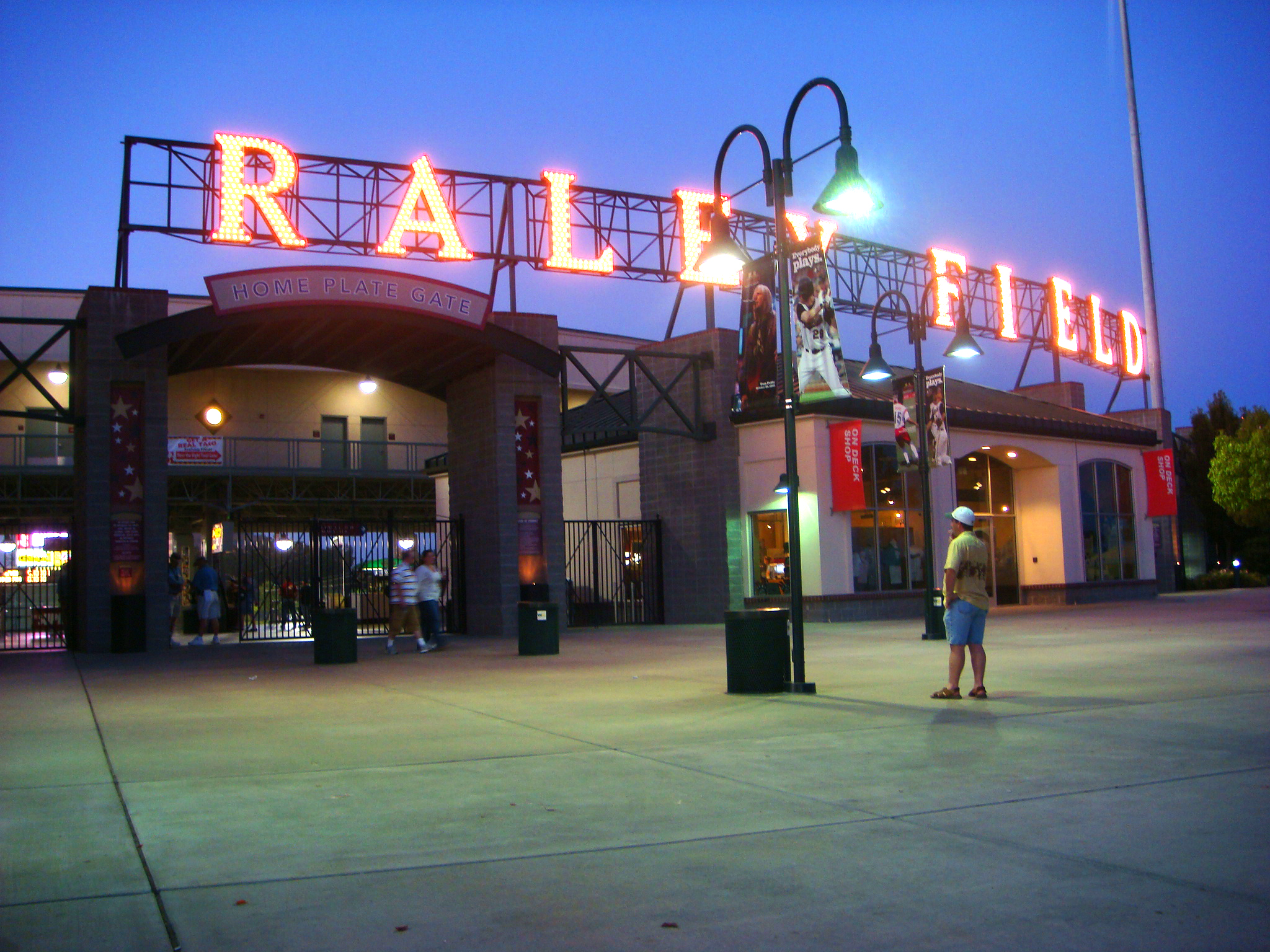
Entrance during the night

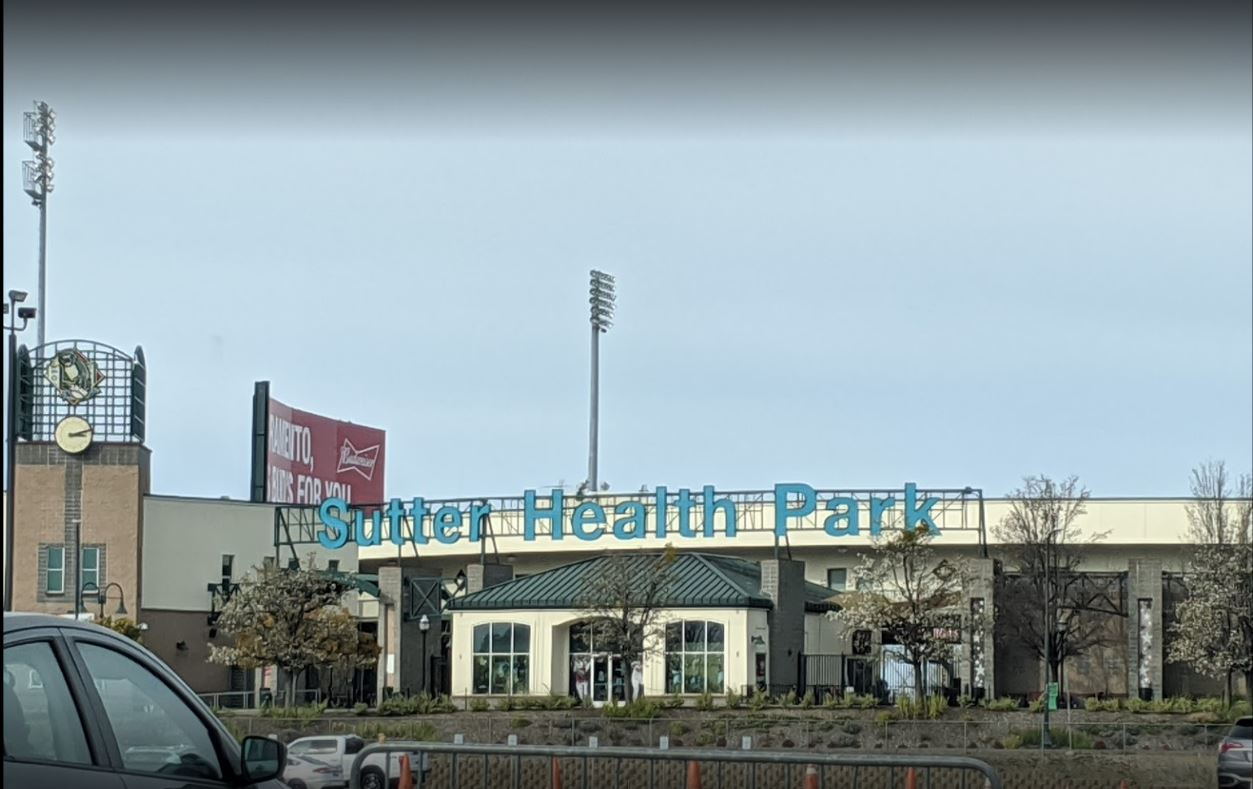
Entrance with new sign

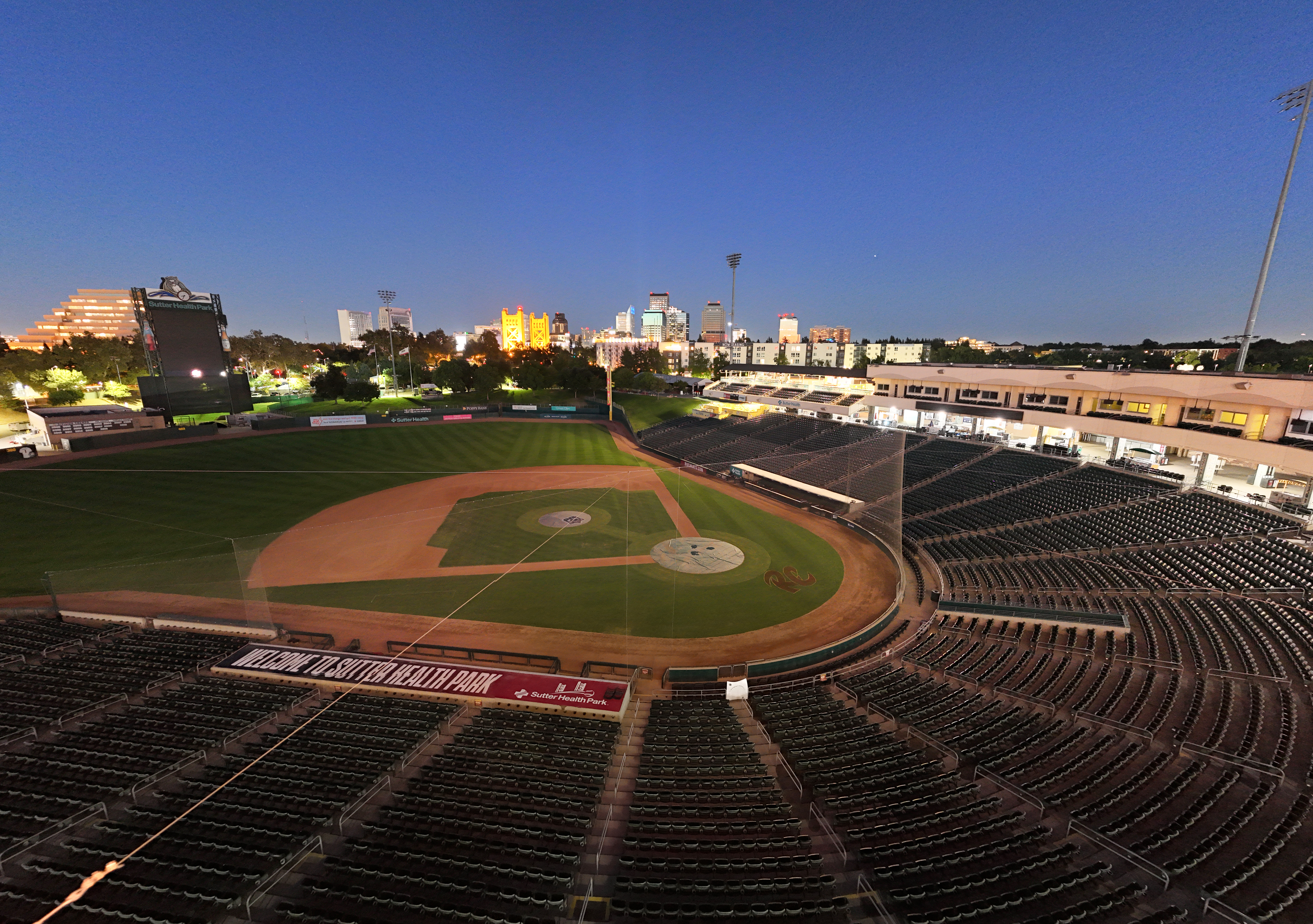
Roof view of the ballpark during an off-night

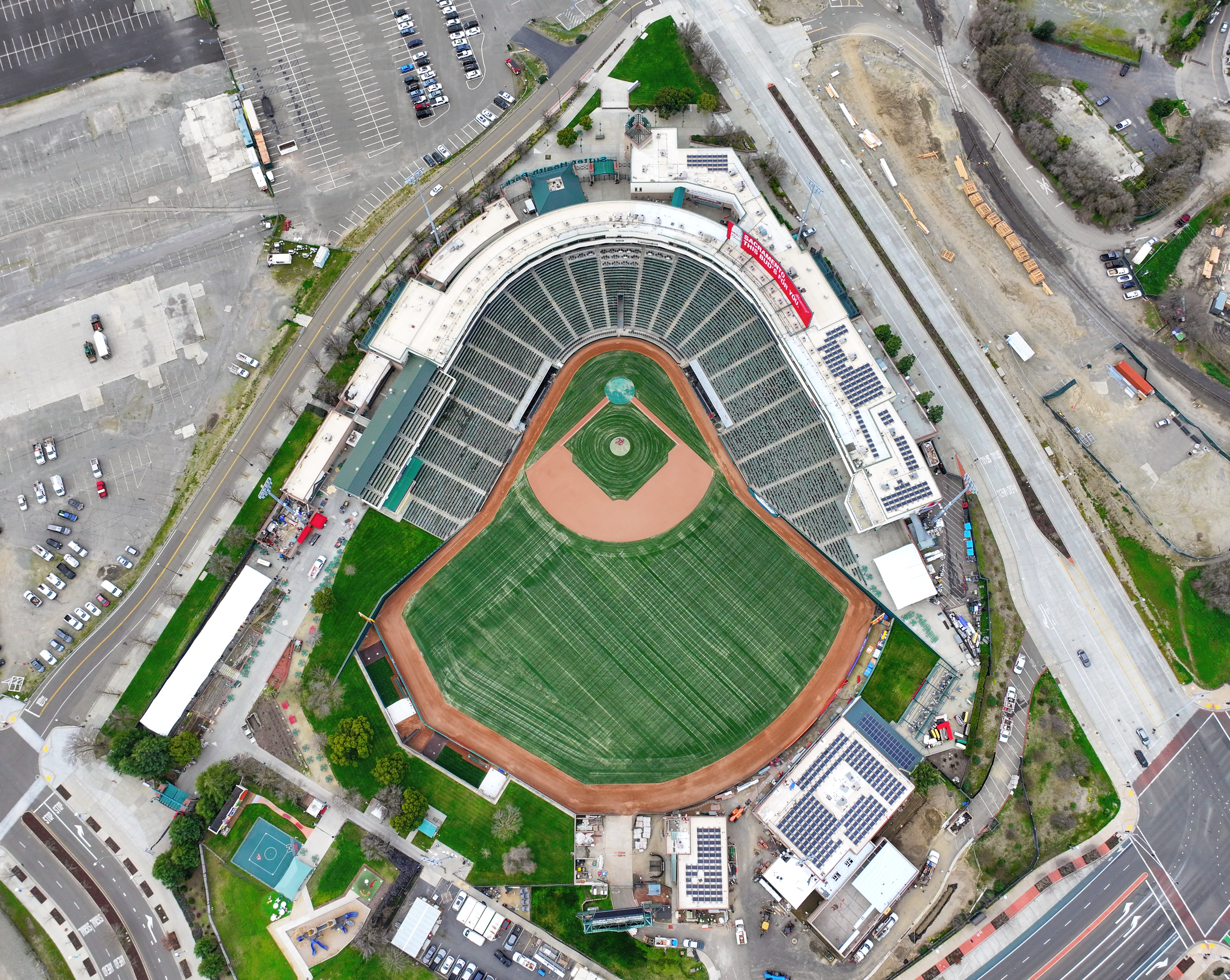
Aerial view in 2024

Events and tenants
Preceded by first ballpark	Home of the Sacramento River Cats; 2000–present	Succeeded by current
Preceded by Oakland Coliseum	Home of the Athletics; 2025–present	Succeeded by current
