= Cathedral Square station =

Cathedral Square
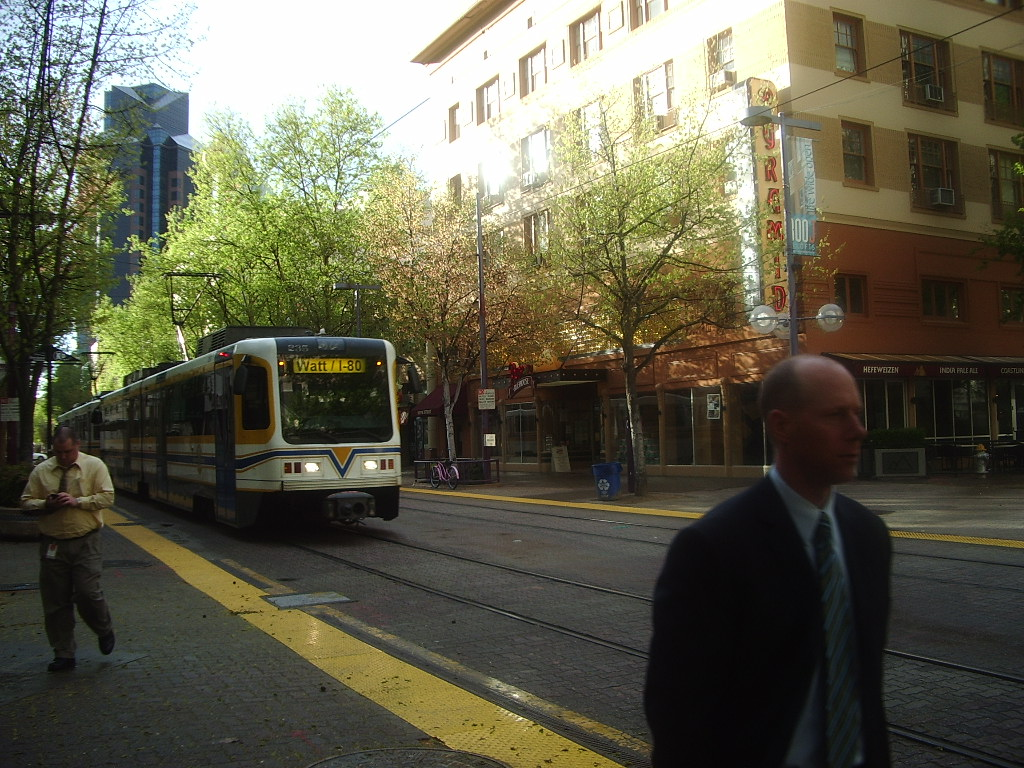
- Train at Cathedral Square station in March 2007

General information
- Location: 10th/11th Streets at K Street; Sacramento, California; United States
- Coordinates: 38°34′44″N 121°29′33″W
- Owner: Sacramento Regional Transit District
- Platforms: 2 side platforms
- Tracks: 2
- Connections: Sacramento Regional Transit: 30, 38, 62; North Natomas Jibe; Yolobus: 42A, 42B, 43, 43R, 230

Construction
- Structure type: At-grade street running
- Accessible: Yes

History
- Opened: March 12, 1987

Services
Preceding station	SacRT	Following station
K & 11th
12th & I toward Watt/I-80	Blue Line	St. Rose of Lima Park One-way operation
K & 10th
12th & I One-way operation	Blue Line	7th & Capitol toward Cosumnes River College
Location

Cathedral Square station is a light rail station on the Blue Line of the SacRT light rail system operated by the Sacramento Regional Transit District. The station's platforms are located in an at-grade, street running portion of the line in Downtown Sacramento along K Street, with the northbound platform at its intersection with 11th Street and the southbound platform at its intersection with 10th Street.

The stop is located near many office buildings, the Sacramento Pyramid Breweries restaurant, and the Cathedral of the Blessed Sacrament.
