= 7th & I and 8th & H stations =

Split light rail station in Sacramento, US

7th & I/County Center 8th & H/County Center
- 7th and I station platform. The Sacramento County Administration Center is adjacent to the station.

General information
- Location: 7th Street and I Street; 8th Street and H Street; Sacramento, California; United States
- Coordinates: 38°34′40″N 121°29′53″W
- Owner: Sacramento Regional Transit District

Construction
- Accessible: Yes

History
- Opened: March 8, 2007; 19 years ago (southbound); January 9, 2012; 14 years ago (northbound)

Services
Preceding station	SacRT	Following station
8th & H/County Center
Sacramento Valley Station Terminus	Gold Line	8th & K One-way operation
7th & Railyards toward 7th & Richards/Township 9	Green Line	8th & K One-way operation
7th & I/County Center
Sacramento Valley Station One-way operation	Gold Line	7th & Capitol toward Historic Folsom
7th & Railyards One-way operation	Green Line	7th & Capitol toward 13th Street
Location

7th & I/County Center (southbound) and 8th & H/County Center (northbound) is a split light rail station served by the Gold Line and Green Line of the Sacramento Regional Transit District. Both station platforms are adjacent to the Sacramento County Administration Center. The southbound platform is located at the intersection of 7th and I Streets, while the northbound platform is located at the intersection of 8th and H Streets.

Gold Line train bound for Sacramento Valley Station departs the 8th and H platform. The Sacramento County Administration Center can be seen adjacent to the station.

== See also ==
- Sacramento Regional Transit District
