= Golden 1 Center =

Arena in Sacramento, California, U.S.

- G1C; The G1

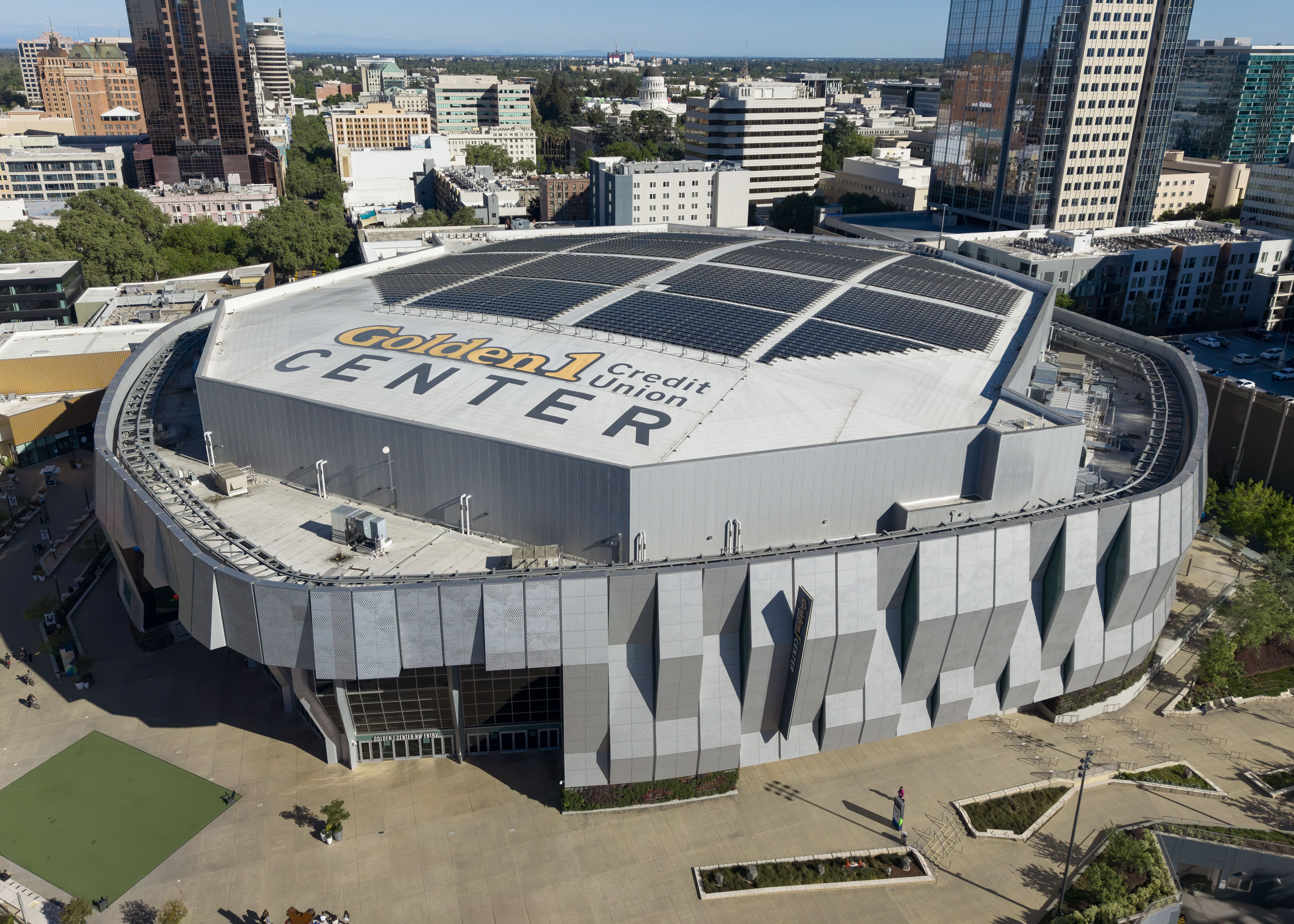
- Golden 1 Center in 2026

- Location in Sacramento Location in California Location in the United States
- Address: 500 David J. Stern Walk
- Location: Sacramento, California, U.S.
- Coordinates: 38°34′49.3″N 121°29′58.6″W
- Owner: City of Sacramento
- Operator: Sacramento Kings LP, LLC
- Capacity: Basketball: 17,608; Concerts: 19,000
- Field size: 779,200 sq ft (72,390 m^{2})
- Public transit: at Sacramento Valley; Blue at 7th & Capitol / 9th & K; Gold Green at 7th & Capitol / 8th & K

Construction
- Groundbreaking: October 29, 2014
- Opened: September 30, 2016
- Cost: US$558.2 million ($749 million in 2025 dollars)
- Architects: AECOM; Mark Dziewulski Architect
- Project manager: ICON Venue Group
- Structural engineers: Thornton Tomasetti/Buehler & Buehler; Geocon Consultants, Inc. (geotechnical engineer)
- Services engineers: Henderson Engineers, Inc.
- General contractor: Turner Construction

Tenant
- Sacramento Kings (NBA) (2016–present)

Website
- golden1center.com

Golden 1 Center is an indoor arena in Downtown Sacramento, California, United States. It sits partially on the site of the former Downtown Plaza shopping center. The publicly owned arena is part of a business and entertainment district called Downtown Commons (DoCo), which includes a $250 million 16-story mixed-use tower.

The arena, which replaced ARCO Arena as the home of the Sacramento Kings of the National Basketball Association, hosts concerts, conventions and other sporting and entertainment events. Capacity is expandable to about 19,000 to accommodate concert audiences. 34 luxury suites were sold to include all events year-round. Suite partners have access to three exclusive clubs on the premium level including two skyboxes that overlook the concourse and have a direct view of the outside. In addition to the luxury suites, there are 48 loft-style suites.

== History ==
As part of the successful effort to keep the Kings in Sacramento, an ownership group led by Vivek Ranadivé purchased the majority stake in the team from the Maloof family, with the city agreeing to partner with the Kings to build a new arena by 2016. Construction began October 29, 2014. Turner Construction, known in the Sacramento area for having built Terminal B at Sacramento International Airport and other projects, was the construction manager for the new arena.

The Kings' previous owners, led by the Maloof family, first proposed a downtown arena in 2012. The arena's estimated cost was $391 million. The City of Sacramento would have paid $255.5 million, the Kings would have contributed $73.25 million, and AEG was going to contribute $58.75 million.

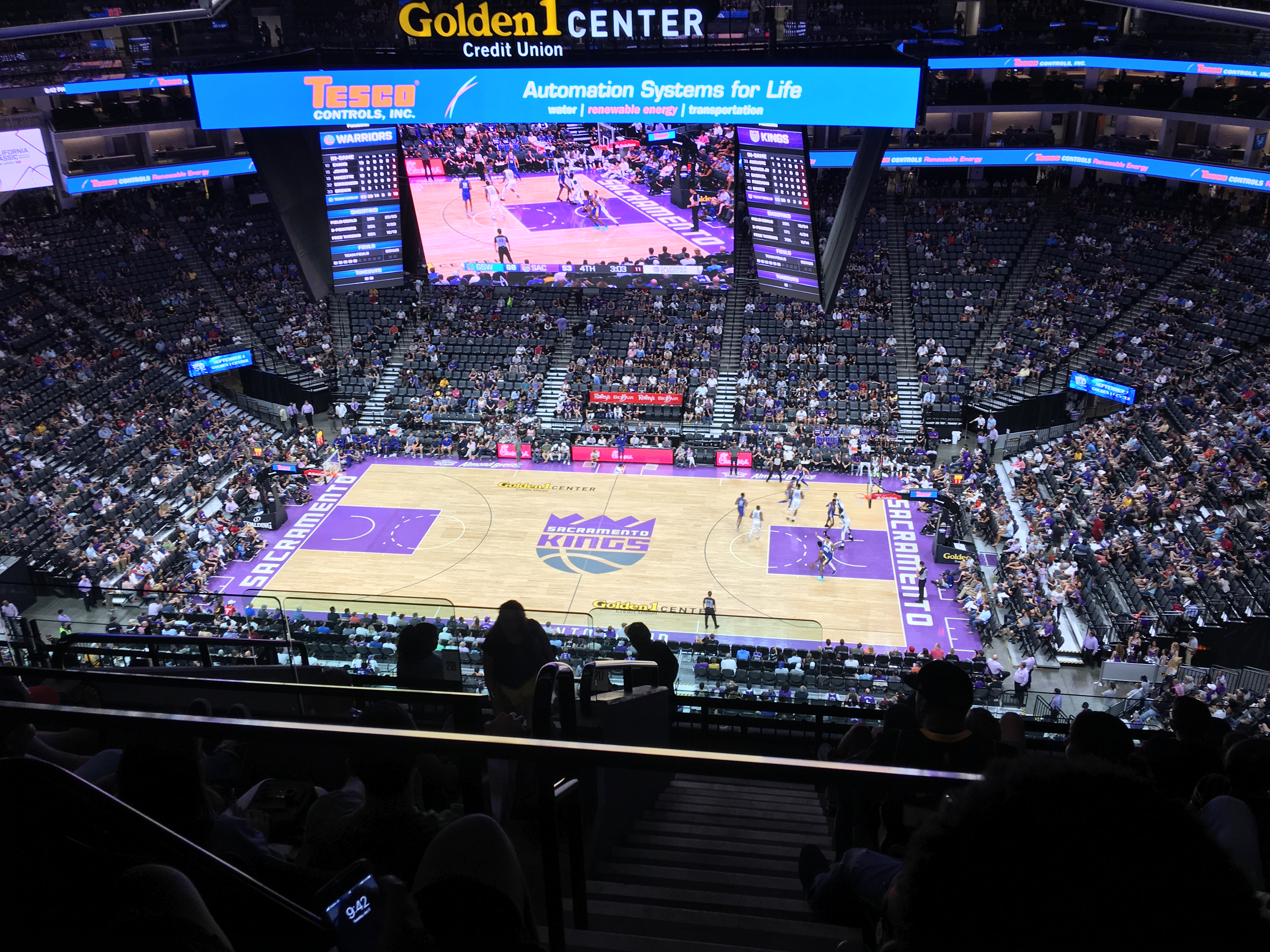
Inside of Golden 1 Center during a Kings game

The Kings decided to name the street leading to the front door of the arena in honor of former NBA Commissioner David Stern, whose persistent, decades-long efforts helped keep the franchise in Sacramento. Officially, the address of Golden 1 Center is 500 David J. Stern Walk. The arena's first concert was held on October 4, 2016, with a two-night concert held by Paul McCartney on his One on One tour.

== Financing ==
The Sacramento City Council voted approval of public financing and other terms on May 20, 2014. The total cost of Golden 1 Center was once estimated to be $507 million. The Sacramento Kings contributed approximately $284 million and the City of Sacramento contributed approximately $223 million. The City of Sacramento financed its contribution through the sale of bonds ($212 million) and parking and economic development funds ($11 million).

Construction costs of the new Golden 1 Center increased to $534.6 million due to a change in the seating configuration that moved hundreds of seats to the lower bowl and closer to the basketball court and additional features.

== Design ==
Golden 1 Center reflects the fabric of Northern California by utilizing regionally sourced materials that range from glass to recycled aluminum to potentially precast concrete, composed of sand from San Benito and rocks of Sierra limestone that reflect the colors of the region. Additionally, Golden 1 Center utilizes only FSC-certified wood, an international standard of quality and responsible forest management.

A rooftop solar array, installed by Solar Power Inc. at a cost of $2.5 million, generates up to 1.2 megawatts, augmented by an 11 megawatt solar field in nearby Rancho Seco operated by the Sacramento Municipal Utility District (SMUD). Installing solar power is part of the Sacramento Kings ownership's goal to have its new sports and entertainment center be the most technologically advanced arena in the country, and that includes being efficient and using renewable energy. The arena earned LEED Platinum certification in late September 2016.

Along with the architectural design, a number of artworks were permanently installed, with works from local artists such as Phil America and Gale Hart and internationally recognized artist Jeff Koons.

A unique fan tradition was born on the arena in 2022. For the season, 4 massive, purple-lit laser beams were installed in the grand entrance of the arena, meant to be lit everytime the Kings garnered a victory, either at home or away. The intense beams can be seen from miles away, and have received significant fan support. Chants of "Light the Beam!" have become common ahead of Kings wins, with the hashtag #LightTheBeam becoming popular within the Kings' social media presence after every win.

=== Technology ===
The main videoboard, to be hung over center court, is 84 feet (26 m) long, 10 feet (3.0 m) shorter than the basketball court below. Developed in partnership with Panasonic Corp. of North America, it consumes more than 6,100 square feet (570 m^{2}) and is currently the second largest screens in the NBA. The main screens are 44 feet (13 m) wide by 24 feet (7.3 m) tall, crowned by 6 foot (1.8 m) tall message boards, and broadcast in 4K Ultra HD. In addition to the main scoreboard, two 25-foot (7.6 m) tall video screens welcome fans as they walk through the arena's main entrance facing the public plaza, and another 600 HD displays broadcast the game to fans gathered in concourses, clubs and suites, Over 1,500 feet (460 m) of LED ribbon boards were installed throughout the arena bowl.

According to a Kings news release, the arena is “the world’s most connected indoor sports and entertainment venue" as the result of a multi-year deal with Comcast to provide “fully redundant transport facilities and two 100-gigabit ethernet dedicated internet circuits” at the facility. Free wi-fi connections at the arena, provided by Ruckus Networks, will be 17,000 times faster than the average home network. The connection will extend into the plaza surrounding the arena. As an example of its bandwidth, the team said the network will be able to handle more than 225,000 posts on Instagram every second.

A rooftop platform with light pipes can be programmed by local artists and used to convey events in the arena to the public through visually appealing light shows.

== Naming rights ==
On June 16, 2015, Sacramento-based Golden 1 Credit Union acquired naming rights for the arena at a cost of $120 million over 20 years, with an average annual value at $6 million, making it one of the largest naming rights deals for a single-tenant NBA arena.

== Accessibility and transportation ==
It is estimated that 10–15% of visitors will walk, bike or take public transportation to Golden 1 Center events. More than 13,500 parking spaces exist within ½ mile of the arena. Sacramento Regional Transit (RT) has five light rail stations in the vicinity, with the closest at 8th & K (also known as St. Rose of Lima Park Station). The Sacramento Valley Station, located at 4th and I Streets, offers Amtrak trains, RT trains and buses, and taxi service.

== Notable events ==
=== Wrestling ===
WWE has held multiple events at Golden 1 Center including No Mercy in 2016 and Hell in a Cell in 2019. The venue also hosts Raw and SmackDown as well. AEW held the post-Revolution Dynamite episode (and Rampage tapings as well) on March 8, 2023.

=== Mixed martial arts ===
On December 17, 2016, UFC on Fox: VanZant vs. Waterson took place at Golden 1 Center and marked the first MMA and UFC event held within the arena. The UFC returned to the arena a decade later for UFC Fight Night: Hernandez vs. Rodrigues.

=== Bull riding ===
Since 2017, the Professional Bull Riders (PBR) have held an annual Built Ford Tough Series event at Golden 1 Center. Prior to 2017 the event was held at the Sleep Train Arena (an event which began in 2005).

=== Basketball ===
==== Professional ====
The Sacramento Kings began using the arena since the 2016–2017 NBA season. The Kings' first game at the arena was on October 10, 2016, against Maccabi Haifa B.C. in a preseason game, winning 135–96. Their first regular-season game at the arena was on October 27, 2016, as the Kings lost to the San Antonio Spurs, 102–94.

==== College ====
The National Collegiate Athletic Association (NCAA) announced Sacramento as a host city for the first and second rounds of the 2017 NCAA Division I men's basketball tournament on March 17 and 19, 2017. The arena hosted the first and second rounds of the NCAA Division I men's basketball tournament in 2023. Sacramento was also selected to host the regionals of the NCAA Division I women's basketball tournament in 2026.

==== High school ====
The arena has been home to the California Interscholastic Federation (CIF) High School Basketball State Championships and CIF Sac-Joaquin Section Basketball Championships since 2017.

=== Politics ===
The winter 2020 legislative session of the California State Legislature was conducted at Golden 1 Center to facilitate social distancing during the COVID-19 pandemic.

Events and tenants
Preceded by Sleep Train Arena	Home of the Sacramento Kings; 2016 – present	Succeeded by current
