= Amador Transit =

Amador Transit is a public transit agency serving Amador County, California. There are routes within the county as well as a weekday commuter route to/from Sutter Creek and Downtown Sacramento.
