= Gold Line (SacRT) =

Light rail line in the Sacramento, California area

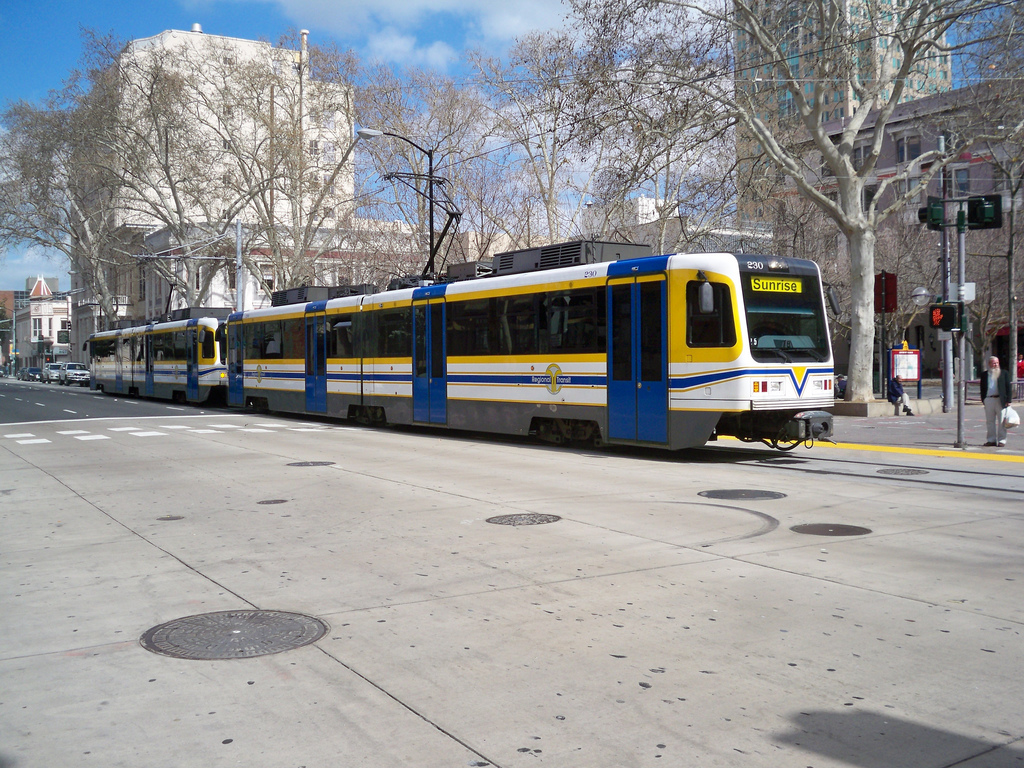
- Gold Line short turn train street running through Downtown Sacramento

Overview
- Locale: Sacramento, California
- Termini: Sacramento Valley Station (west); Historic Folsom (east)
- Stations: 27

Service
- Type: Light rail
- System: SacRT light rail
- Services: Route 507
- Operator: Sacramento Regional Transit District
- Daily ridership: 16,770 (Q2 2018)

History
- Opened: March 12, 1987; 39 years ago (as Watt/I-80–Downtown–Butterfield)

Technical
- Number of tracks: 2 (Downtown–Sunrise); 1 (Sunrise–Folsom)
- Track gauge: 4 ft 8 1/2 in (1,435 mm) standard gauge
- Electrification: Overhead line, 750 V DC
Route map
Gold Line highlighted in gold

The Gold Line is a light rail transit line in the Sacramento Regional Transit District (SacRT) light rail system. Operating between Sacramento Valley and Historic Folsom stations, the line runs primarily east-west in Sacramento (including downtown, Midtown, East Sacramento), portions of unincorporated Sacramento County, Rancho Cordova, Gold River and Folsom. Segments of the Gold Line run along the system's original alignment between 16th Street and Butterfield stations, which opened for service in 1987. The line has run in its modern configuration since June 2005, with extensions completed since then to Folsom and the downtown Amtrak station.

== History ==
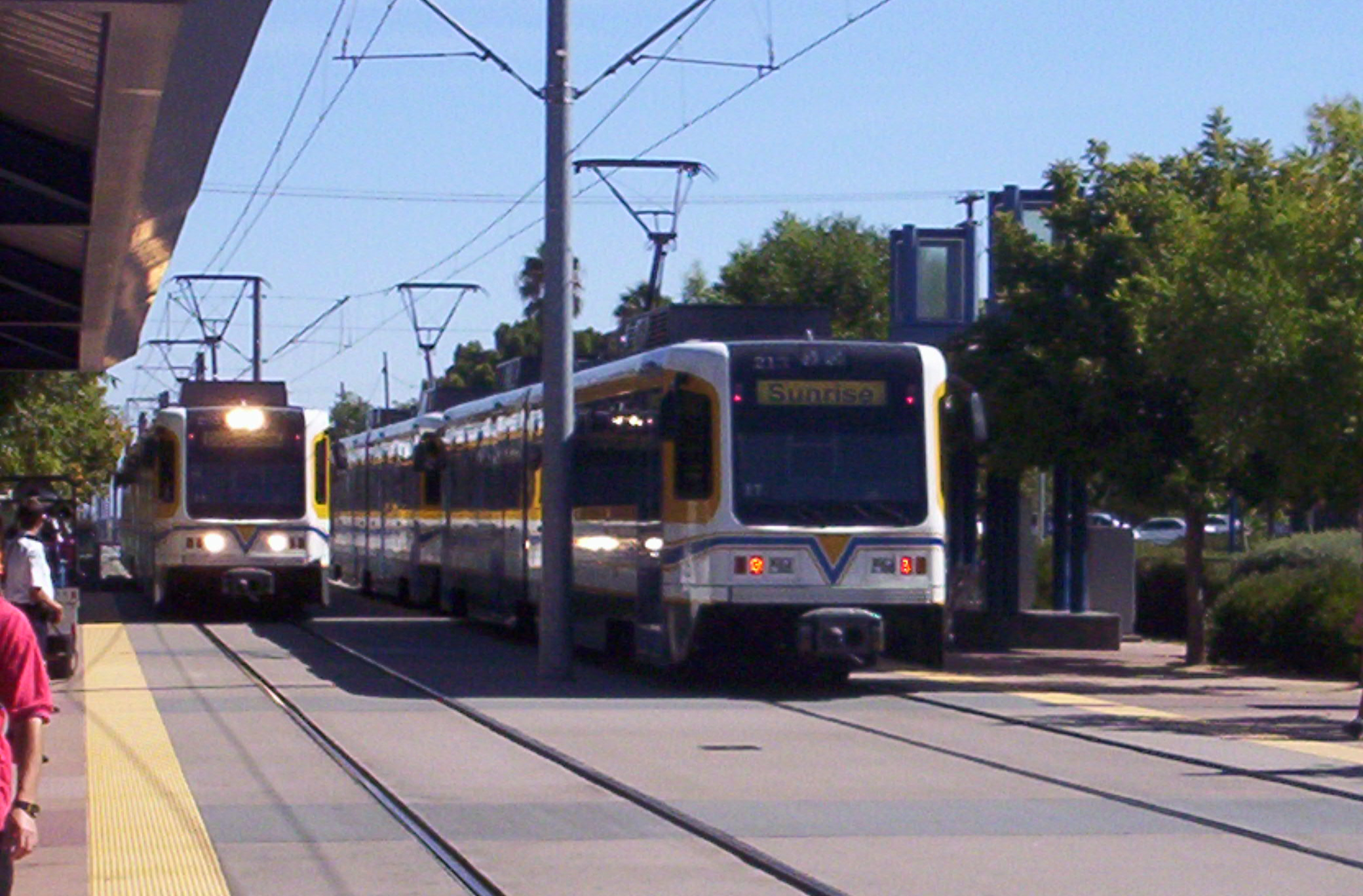
A CAF trainset Train at Mather Field/Mills station

The first light rail line of the RT, which opened in 1987, was an 18.3-mile (29.5 km) route between Watt/I-80 station in North Sacramento, through downtown, and continuing east on Folsom Boulevard to Butterfield Way station. It was built at a cost of $176 million USD ($499 million in 2025 adjusted for inflation), which included the cost of vehicles and maintenance and storage facilities. Much of the line, when it was first built, was single-tracked, though improvements over the 1990s allowed much of the original system to be double-tracked. The line was built mainly using the Sacramento Valley Railroad right-of-way, coupled with use of structures of an abandoned freeway project. A limited portion of the route runs on streets, mainly in downtown Sacramento.

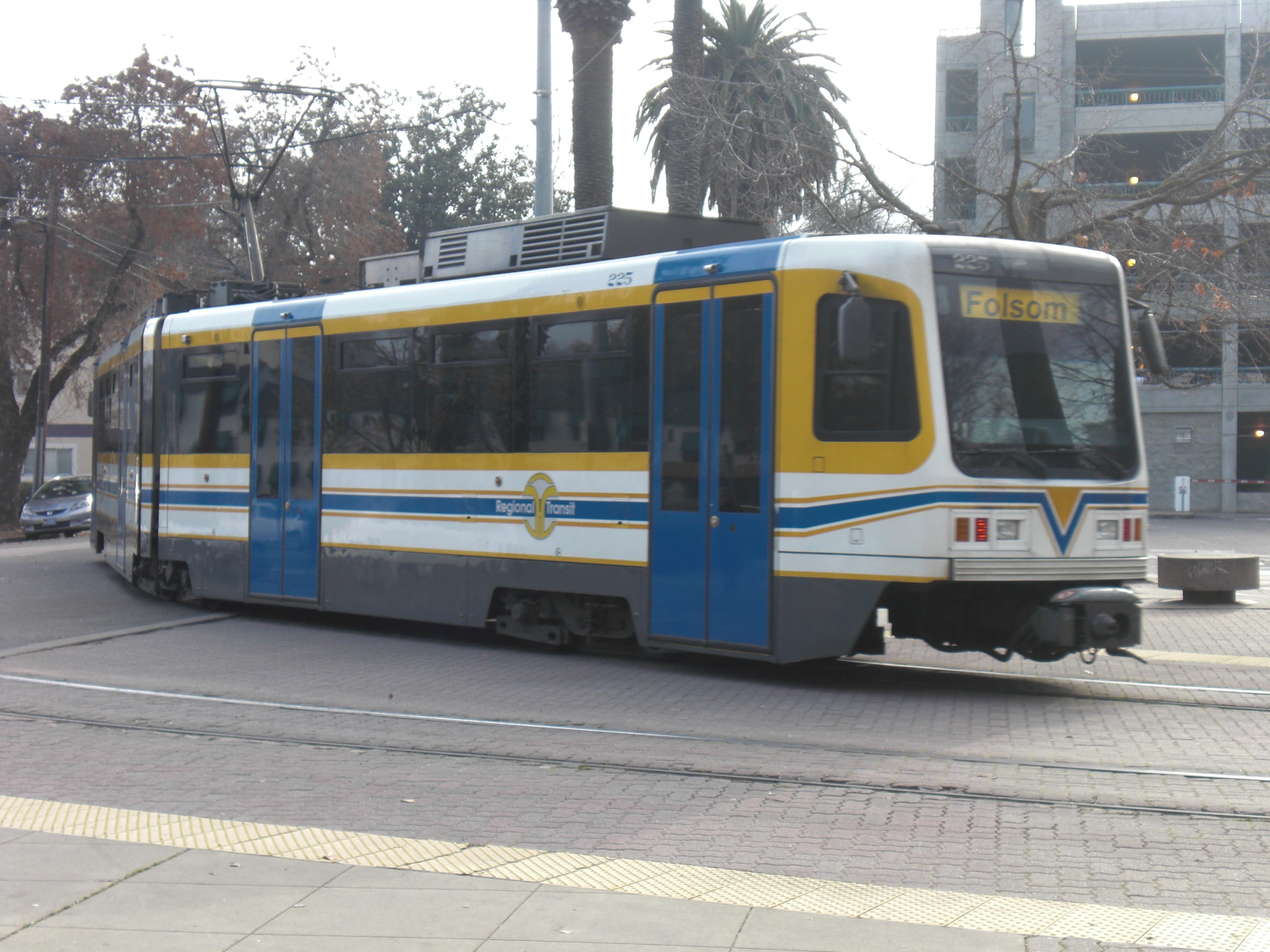
A CAF LRV at Archives Plaza Station

The line became more popular than anyone anticipated, necessitating further expansions and improvements. Two new stations at 39th and 48th streets opened in 1994, and a 2.3-mile (3.7 km) extension to the Mather Field/Mills station was completed in 1998. In June 2004, a further extension from Mather Field/Mills to Sunrise was opened. On September 26, 2003, the South Line (now part of the Blue Line) opened for 6.3 miles (10.1 km) between the 16th Street station on the Watt/I-80-Downtown-Mather Field/Mills line and a station at Meadowview Road in the south end, which is the first phase of a planned longer 11.2-mile (18.0 km) line to Elk Grove. Much of the extension follows a railroad right-of-way. When it opened, 7 new stops were added to the system.

In June 2005, following a reconfiguration of the light rail system, the Sunrise–Downtown Line was created (trains formerly continued beyond the downtown St. Rose of Lima Park station to Watt/I-80); it runs from St. Rose/K-Street to Sunrise with an extension to the Folsom area that opened on October 15, 2005. It has since been redesignated in color as the Gold Line. On December 8, 2006 it was extended even further to the downtown Amtrak depot (a.k.a. the Sacramento Valley Station), which provided interchanges between the light rail system and the national rail system for the first time.

Prior to 2025, headways were limited to 30 minutes between Sunrise and Historic Folsom stations due to single tracking on the east end between Parkshore Drive and Bidwell Street. Sac RT released a study in 2020 on the possibility of adding additional passing sidings in the area to run twice as many trains in addition to reconfiguring station platforms for use with new low-floor rolling stock. The project to add a passing loop near Glenn station broke ground in 2023 and was completed in January 2025. While originally intended to run 15 minute headways at all Folsom area stations, as of February 2025, the line runs a modified schedule of three trips per hour between Sunrise and Historic Folsom stations with a mix of 15 and 30 minute headways, using new Siemens S700 low-floor rolling stock on the line.

By 2025, a new infill station was planned at Horn Road.

== Line description ==
The Gold Line begins at its western terminus in downtown at the Sacramento Valley station where it connects with Amtrak. From there it travels on H Street in a single-track, then diverges into one-way tracks for 7th and 8th Streets where it joins the Blue and Green Lines. It then turns westward on O Street, southward on 12th, then eastward in an alley paralleling Q and R Streets. After passing the 16th Street station, the Gold Line splits from the Blue Line (the Green Line terminates at 13th Street station), crossing over a bridge near The Sacramento Bee headquarters, before continuing on R Street in Midtown. It continues in its own right-of-way in East Sacramento next to Highway 50, then crosses under Highway 50 and parallels Folsom Boulevard and the Union Pacific Railroad Placerville Branch Line, which is partly operational today, for most of its length. Its path was built mainly using the Sacramento Valley Railroad right-of-way. The Gold Line then reaches its eastern terminus at Historic Folsom station in Folsom, although some trains terminate at Sunrise station.

== Station listing ==
The following table lists the current stations of the Gold Line, from west to east.

Key
†	Closed station

Station	Opened	Transfers
Sacramento Valley Station	December 8, 2006	Sacramento Regional Transit: 30, 38; Amtrak: California Zephyr, Capitol Corridor, Coast Starlight, San Joaquins
7th & I (southbound); 8th & H (northbound)	2007	Green; Sacramento Regional Transit: 11, 51, 102, 103, 106, 107, 109, 129, 134
8th & K (northbound only)	2007	Green; Sacramento Regional Transit: 30, 38, 62, 86, 88, 142 (Airport Express); North Natomas Jibe; Yolobus: 42A, 42B, 43, 43R, 230
St. Rose of Lima Park † (southbound: 7th & K)	March 12, 1987	Closed September 30, 2016
7th & Capitol (southbound); 8th & Capitol (northbound)	March 12, 1987	Blue Green; Sacramento Regional Transit: 11, 30, 38, 51, 62, 86, 88, 102, 103, 106, 107, 109, 129, 134, 142 (Airport Express), E10, E11, E12, E13, E14, E15, E16, E17, E18; North Natomas Jibe; Roseville Transit: 1, 2, 3, 4, 5, 6, 7, 8, 9, 10; Yolobus: 42A, 42B, 43, 43R, 230
8th & O	March 12, 1987	Blue Green; Sacramento Regional Transit: 11, 51, 102, 103, 106, 107, 109, E10, E11, E12, E13, E14, E15, E16, E17, E18; North Natomas Jibe; Yolobus: 42A, 42B, 43, 43R, 230
Archives Plaza	March 12, 1987	Blue Green
13th Street	March 12, 1987	Blue Green
16th Street	March 12, 1987	Blue; Sacramento Regional Transit: 106, 109, E10, E11, E12, E13, E14, E15, E16, E17, E18
23rd Street	March 12, 1987	Sacramento Regional Transit: SmaRT Ride Downtown–Midtown–East Sacramento
29th Street	March 12, 1987	Sacramento Regional Transit: 38, 67, 68, SmaRT Ride Downtown–Midtown–East Sacramento; Mercy General shuttle; Sutter shuttle
39th Street/UC Davis Health	July 14, 1994	Sacramento Regional Transit: SmaRT Ride Downtown–Midtown–East Sacramento; UC Davis Medical Center shuttle
48th Street	July 14, 1994	Sacramento Regional Transit: SmaRT Ride Downtown–Midtown–East Sacramento
59th Street	March 12, 1987	Sacramento Regional Transit: SmaRT Ride Downtown–Midtown–East Sacramento
University/65th Street	March 12, 1987	Sacramento Regional Transit: 26, 38, 81, 82, 87, SmaRT Ride Downtown–Midtown–East Sacramento; Amador Transit: 1; El Dorado Transit: Sacramento Commuter; Hornet Shuttle: Hornet Line
Power Inn	March 12, 1987	
College Greens	March 12, 1987	Sacramento Regional Transit: 161
Watt/Manlove	March 12, 1987	Sacramento Regional Transit: 72, 84
Starfire	March 12, 1987	Sacramento Regional Transit: 84
Tiber	March 12, 1987	
Butterfield	March 12, 1987	Sacramento Regional Transit: 78, E19
Mather Field/Mills	September 6, 1998	Sacramento Regional Transit: 21, 72, 75, 78, SmaRT Ride Rancho Cordova
Zinfandel	June 11, 2004	Sacramento Regional Transit: 175, 176, 177, SmaRT Ride Rancho Cordova
Cordova Town Center	June 11, 2004	Sacramento Regional Transit: SmaRT Ride Rancho Cordova
Sunrise	June 11, 2004	Sacramento Regional Transit: 124, SmaRT Ride Rancho Cordova
Hazel	October 15, 2005	
Iron Point	October 15, 2005	Sacramento Regional Transit: F10, SmaRT Ride Folsom; El Dorado Transit: 50 Express
Glenn	October 15, 2005	Sacramento Regional Transit: F30, SmaRT Ride Folsom
Historic Folsom	October 15, 2005	Sacramento Regional Transit: F10, SmaRT Ride Folsom
