= Sacramento Streetcar =

Proposed tram line in California

Downtown / Riverfront Streetcar

Overview
- Status: Proposed
- Locale: Sacramento / West Sacramento
- Termini: Sacramento Valley Station; Sutter Health Park
- Website: www.sacrt.com/sacramento-downtown-riverfront-streetcar-project/

Service
- Type: Streetcar
- Operator: Sacramento Regional Transit District
- Rolling stock: Siemens S700 (planned)

History
- Opened: 2030 (planned)

Technical
- Line length: 1.5 mi (2.4 km)
- Track gauge: 4 ft 8 1/2 in (1,435 mm) standard gauge
- Electrification: Overhead

The Downtown Riverfront Streetcar Project is a proposed 1.5-mile (2.4 km) streetcar line intended to connect West Sacramento to Sacramento's downtown business districts and the greater transportation network. The project is being undertaken by a consortium including the City of Sacramento, the City of West Sacramento, the Yolo County Transportation District, and the Sacramento Regional Transit District.

== Planning ==
In 2008 West Sacramento voters passed Measures U and V, a raise in sales tax dedicated to streetcar funding. At the time, the streetcar was envisioned as a 4.4-mile (7.1 km) line running from Midtown to West Sacramento. While distinct from the SacRT light rail system, it would have shared some right-of-way and assets with that system; RT would likely also operate the line. If built, the service was expected to attract 5,800 daily riders.

The project received $50 million from the federal government for construction in May 2017. By June 2017, $200 million in local, state, and federal grants had been secured to build the streetcar line. A special district that includes businesses close to the streetcar agreed to a tax to offset operating costs; it was expected to generate $50 million over 25 years.

Plans stalled in 2019 as construction bids came in significantly higher than expected, with the lowest bid at $184 million, or $76 million higher than anticipated. The Sacramento City Council dissolved its special-use district dedicated to streetcar maintenance in August 2019.

After failure of the initial plan, the line was retooled into a shorter 1.5-mile (2.4 km) route running from Sacramento Valley Station to Sutter Health Park in West Sacramento via Tower Bridge with one additional stop. The revised alignment would have inbound streetcars turn south at 3rd Street after the Tower Bridge and then turn west along N Street to join the existing light rail tracks towards Sacramento Valley Station. SacRT plans to operate the service using a single Siemens S700 car, the same vehicle that is used on existing SacRT light rail service. As of 2026, the Public Comment Period has been expanded till the 12th of February. Initial construction is expected to begin in the Fall of 2026, and completed in 2029.

As of May 2026, SacRT plans to begin construction in 2027, and open the line by 2030. Three workshops seeking public feedback about the line were held in June 2026.

== See also ==
- Streetcars in North America
- Light rail in the United States
