= Green Line (SacRT) =

Light rail line in Sacramento, California

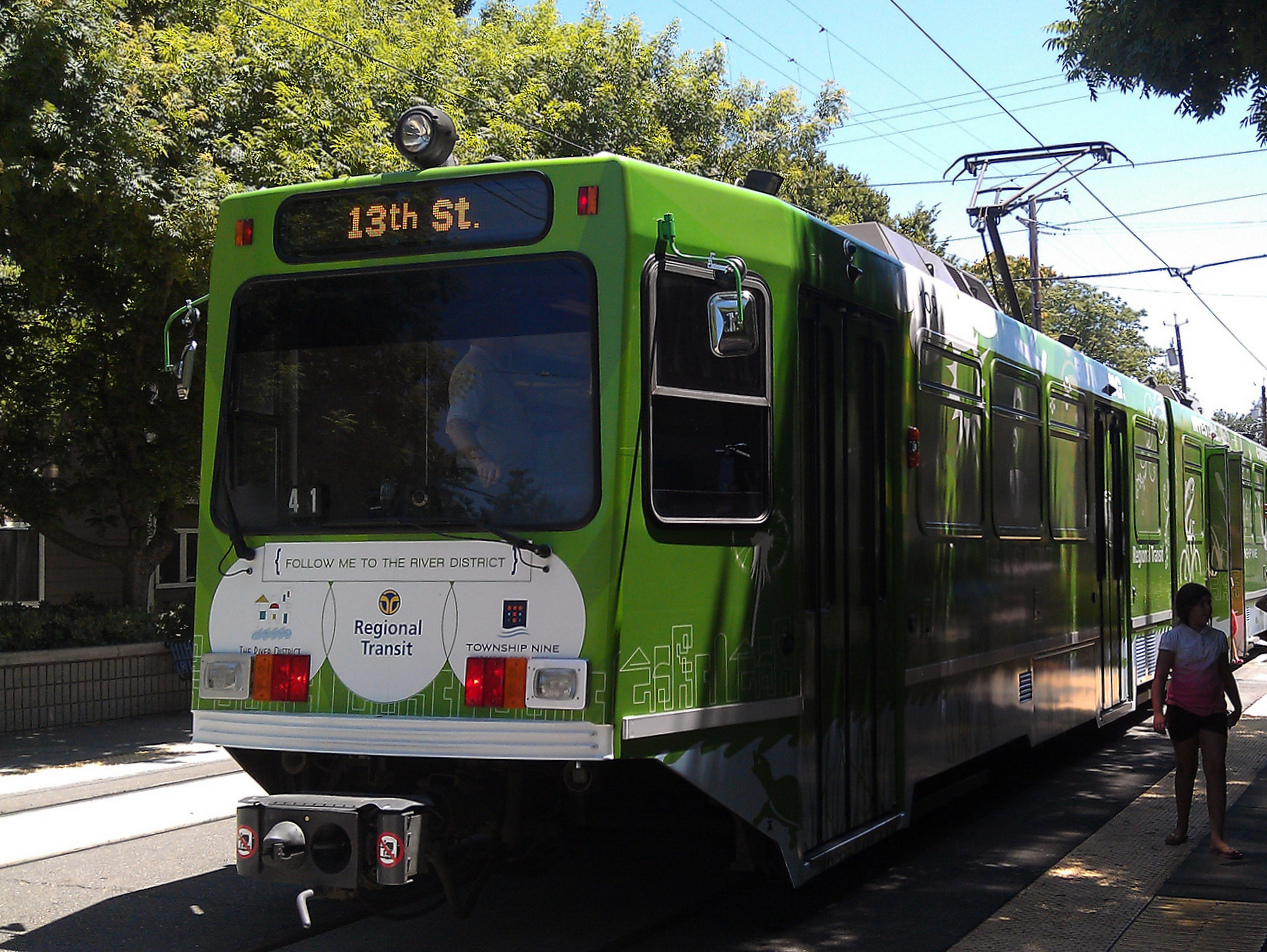
- Light rail car wearing a promotional Green Line wrap

Overview
- Status: Operational
- Owner: Sacramento Regional Transit District
- Locale: Sacramento, California
- Termini: 13th Street (south); 7th & Richards/Township 9 (north)
- Stations: 8

Service
- Type: Light rail
- System: SacRT light rail
- Services: Line 519
- Daily ridership: 440 (Q2 2018)

History
- Opened: June 15, 2012; 14 years ago

Technical
- Number of tracks: 7th & Richards/Township 9 – County Center: 1; County Center – 13th Street: 2
- Character: At-grade street running
- Track gauge: 4 ft 8 1/2 in (1,435 mm) standard gauge
- Electrification: Overhead line, 750 V DC
Route map
Green Line highlighted in green

The Green Line is a light rail line in Sacramento, California, and one of three lines in the Sacramento Regional Transit District (SacRT) light rail system. It opened on June 15, 2012, and runs between 7th & Richards/Township 9 station and 13th Street station, serving the River District and the Sacramento Railyards development before joining the other light rail lines in Downtown Sacramento. Plans call for extending the line north to Sacramento International Airport.

The line operates on weekdays, with trains scheduled every 30 minutes from 6 a.m. to 8:30 p.m.

== History ==
In the 1990s, SacRT started identifying corridors for new light rail extensions and selected an alignment for a new line that would reach the Sacramento Airport from Sacramento via Natomas. Formal planning for the line began in the early 2000s. Construction for the initial segment of the Green Line that runs to the River District began in late 2009 after finalizing environmental review in early 2009. The initial line opened for service on June 15, 2012, with a single new station at Township 9.

In 2016, low ridership on the Green Line and the lack of development at Township 9 led the SacRT Board to consider closing the line in 2017.

Green Line service was suspended between June 16, 2025 and October 12, 2026 during construction of 7th & Railyards station, which opened on October 15.

== Line description ==
From its northern terminus at 7th & Richards/Township 9 station in the River District, the Green Line runs south along 7th Street on a single track. At G Street in downtown Sacramento, the line splits into two tracks along 7th and 8th streets, where it joins the Blue and Gold lines. The Green Line then runs west along O Street, south along 12th Street, and east through an alley paralleling Q and R streets before reaching its southern terminus at 13th Street station.

== Station listing ==
The following table lists the current stations of the Green Line, from north to south.

Key
†	Closed station

Station	Opened	Transfers
7th & Richards/Township 9	June 15, 2012	Sacramento Regional Transit: 11, 103, 106, 129; El Dorado Transit; South County Transit: Galt – Sacramento Commuter Express; Yuba-Sutter Transit; Greyhound Lines
7th & Railyards	October 15, 2026	
County Center (southbound: 7th & I, northbound: 8th & H)	June 15, 2012	Gold; Sacramento Regional Transit: 11, 51, 102, 103, 106, 107, 109, 129, 134
St. Rose of Lima Park (northbound: 8th & K)	March 12, 1987	Gold; Sacramento Regional Transit: 30, 38, 62, 86, 88, 142 (Airport Express); North Natomas Jibe; Yolobus: 42A, 42B, 43, 43R, 230
St. Rose of Lima Park † (southbound: 7th & K)	March 12, 1987	Closed September 30, 2016
7th & Capitol (southbound); 8th & Capitol (northbound)	March 12, 1987	Blue Gold; Sacramento Regional Transit: 11, 30, 38, 51, 62, 86, 88, 102, 103, 106, 107, 109, 129, 134, 142 (Airport Express), E10, E11, E12, E13, E14, E15, E16, E17, E18; Roseville Transit: 1, 2, 3, 4, 5, 6, 7, 8, 9, 10, 11; South County Transit: Galt – Sacramento Commuter Express; Yolobus: 37, 40, 41, 42A/B, 43, 43R, 230, 240
8th & O	March 12, 1987	Blue Gold; Sacramento Regional Transit: 11, 51, 102, 103, 106, 107, 109, E10, E11, E12, E13, E14, E15, E16, E17, E18; Yolobus: 42A, 42B, 43, 43R, 230
Archives Plaza	March 12, 1987	Blue Gold
13th Street	March 12, 1987	Blue Gold

== Future expansion ==
=== Proposed airport link ===
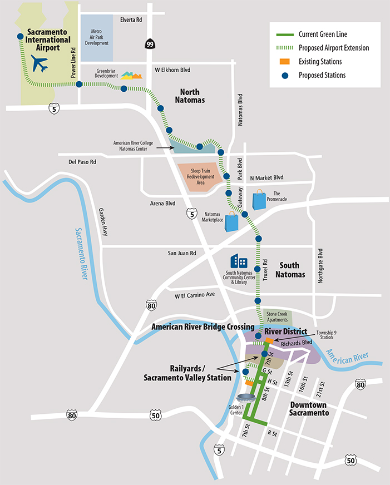
SacRT map of proposed extension

The Green Line to Sacramento International Airport (SMF) light rail future extension Project will extend service 13 miles (21 km) to Sacramento International Airport. As of May 2019, future new Green Line stations, South to Northwest from the existing 7th & Richards/Township 9 Station, are:

- Sequoia Pacific Station (Optional)
- West El Camino Station
- Pebblestone Way Station
- San Juan Station
- Gateway Park Station
- Arena Blvd. Station
- (Unnamed station)
- East Town Center Station
- North Natomas Town Center Station
- Commerce Parkway Station (Optional)
- Club Center Drive Station
- Greenbriar Station (Optional)
- Metro Air Park Station (Optional)
- Sacramento International Airport -SMF- Station

As of 2022, SacRT is considering implementing this project in phases, with service initially being provided by a bus rapid transit (BRT) on roughly the same route. This BRT service would later be replaced by the Green Line extension proper, known as the Green Line to the Airport.
