= Downtown Commons =

- Location: Sacramento, California, United States
- Coordinates: 38.581°N 121.5°W
- Address: 405 K Street
- Opened: 1971 (as Downtown Plaza); 2017 (as Downtown Commons)
- Closed: 2014 (as Sacramento Downtown Plaza)
- Developer: The Hahn Company
- Manager: JMA Ventures, LLC
- Owner: Sacramento Kings LP, LLC
- Num. of stores: 36
- Num. of anchor tenants: 4 (3 open, 1 vacant)
- Floor area: 630,000 square feet (59,000 m^{2}) (not including Golden 1 Center)
- Floors: 1-2 (5 in Golden 1 Center, 16 in tower occupied by The Sawyer)
- Parking: 4,045
- Public transit: St. Rose of Lima Park
- Website: docosacramento.com

Downtown Commons (or DOCO), formerly known as Sacramento Downtown Plaza, Westfield (Shoppingtown) Downtown Plaza and Downtown Plaza, is a part single level, part two-level outdoor mixed-use entertainment, dining, and retail complex operated by JMA Ventures, LLC, located along the alignment of K Street (also known as David J. Stern Walk between 5th and 7th Streets) in downtown Sacramento, California, United States, near the State Capitol building. The complex is bordered by J Street to the north, L Street to the south, 7th Street to the east and 4th Street to the west. Downtown Commons' previous format was a mainly two-level outdoor shopping mall commonly known as Downtown Plaza, despite numerous official name changes over the years. The majority of the site has been redeveloped, centering on Golden 1 Center, home of the NBA's Sacramento Kings. The section between 5th and 7th Streets was demolished in 2014 to make room for Golden 1 Center, as well as The Sawyer, a 250-room boutique hotel operated by Kimpton Hotels immediately north of the arena site. The remaining standing section between 4th and 5th Streets was also redeveloped a few years later in association with the arena project. A Macy's, which predated Downtown Plaza, anchored the west end of the complex for several decades before closing in March 2025.

In addition to the arena and the hotel, the complex also features a 24 Hour Fitness, a Century Theatres movie theater, and numerous restaurants, eateries and shops.

== History ==
Downtown Commons was originally built in 1971 as Downtown Plaza by The Hahn Company as a mixed enclosed and open-air plaza adjoining a pre-existing Macy's store built in 1963. It was unique in a way that allowed uninterrupted pedestrian traffic from one end of the plaza to the other, while vehicle traffic on 5th Street ran underneath the plaza, a feature that still exists to this day. Weinstock's relocated their downtown store in 1979 to the center, and in 1981 added a Liberty House store. Liberty House closed in 1984 and was replaced by I. Magnin, which closed in 1992. The center was completely renovated in 1993, adding a second story, a food court, various upscale shops, and a United Artists Theatres with seven screens (Century Theatres took over ownership of the theater in 2000). An entertainment complex named America Live! also opened in the spot formerly occupied by I. Magnin, housing various nightclubs and bars. Downtown Plaza became the Sacramento area’s second two-level shopping mall (after Arden Fair) to open, but was the area’s first and only outdoor two-level shopping mall. After Federated Department Stores (parent company of Macy's at the time) acquired Broadway Stores (parent company of Weinstock's) in 1995, the former Weinstock's store became a second Macy's location in 1996, housing Macy's Men's & Furniture. In 1997, Hard Rock Cafe opened their first Sacramento restaurant at the east end of the mall where America Live! operated, which closed a year prior. The restaurant operated for 13 years before closing in late March 2010 after their lease expired. The upper level portion of the old America Live! was occupied by Copeland's Sports until the small sporting goods chain went out of business.

The center was sold to Westfield America, Inc. in 1998 and renamed as Westfield Shoppingtown Downtown Plaza. The unwieldy "Shoppingtown" was dropped from the name in 2005. Various redevelopment proposals, including plans for a Target store and an unnamed grocery store as new anchors, never came to fruition and the center declined. Small retail and restaurant occupancy rates at the mall plummeted from 96% in 2004 to 51% in 2012. The facility also housed office space, only 53% of which was occupied in 2004, declining to 38% by 2012.

On August 15, 2012, after a lack of investment on the shopping center, JMA Ventures, LLC of San Francisco acquired the mall from Westfield, effectively dropping "Westfield" from the name of the mall, and it was renamed Sacramento Downtown Plaza (although signs around the property that were erected by Westfield, minus the "Westfield" name, reflected the mall's original name).

In April 2014, after further decline and high vacancies continuing to plague the shopping center, Sacramento Downtown Plaza from 5th to 7th Streets permanently closed to make way for the new arena for the Sacramento Kings. Initially, the section between 4th and 5th Streets, which included Macy's, Century Theatres, Forever 21, Starbucks, Johnny Rockets, the food court and local restaurant River City Brewing Company, was to remain open during demolition and construction, but in 2015, it too was permanently closed (except for Macy's and Century Theatres) so renovations on the remaining standing section can begin.

On September 16, 2015, Sacramento Downtown Plaza was renamed Downtown Commons (or DOCO for short) to reflect the shopping center's new direction as a retail and entertainment complex. Century Theatres closed the movie theater on January 11, 2016 for renovations. The renovations have added upgraded seating and two additional screens, bringing the total number of screens to nine. The theater re-opened on December 22, 2017. The Kimpton Sawyer Hotel opened on October 10, 2017 on the site of the property's former low-rise office building. In 2018, redevelopment of the remaining portion of the old Downtown Plaza between 4th and 5th Streets was completed and reopened. While this section remained two levels, the portion of the center from 5th to 7th Streets returned to a single-level open-air plaza configuration. The building that originally opened as Liberty House in 1981 and later occupied by I. Magnin, America Live!, and Hard Rock Cafe is now occupied by restaurant Sauced BBQ & Spirits (in the old Hard Rock Cafe) and 24 Hour Fitness.

In the 2020s, Downtown Commons created a merchants’ association as a way to promote the retail and entertainment complex. They are made up of businesses that lie within DOCO's property boundaries, but aren't officially part of the center as these businesses occupy buildings with separate owners.

On January 9, 2025, it was announced that Macy's will close its store after 62 years in downtown Sacramento. The store was on a list of 66 locations to close nationwide, which included the pair of stores at Sunrise Mall in nearby Citrus Heights, California. The store closed on March 23, 2025. On July 10, 2025, the Shingle Springs Band of Miwok Indians, a Native American tribe, purchased the former Macy's for $15 million. No immediate plans were announced regarding the former department store.

== Arena conversion ==
The Sacramento Kings have built an arena where the eastern two-thirds of the former Downtown Plaza was located (the section between 5th and 7th Streets). Named Golden 1 Center, it replaces the aging Sleep Train Arena (formerly ARCO Arena) in the North Natomas area of Sacramento, where the Kings had played since 1988. After a protracted battle with the owners of the Macy's Men's & Furniture store (the former Weinstock's), the city took the property by using eminent domain laws, and the remaining retail stores vacated this area by April 30, 2014. The Men's and Furniture departments were then consolidated into the main Macy's store at the west end of the mall. Demolition began on this section, including the former Macy's store, in August 2014 and was complete by late 2014. The building that houses 24 Hour Fitness was left intact, unaffected by the mall-wide closure and demolition and remains open. The section between 4th and 5th Streets was initially going to remain open during construction, but instead was also slated to be renovated in association with construction of Golden 1 Center; tenants in that section, except for Macy's and Century Theatres, which remained open at the time, vacated the mall sometime between June and September 2015. Golden 1 Center officially opened to the public on September 30, 2016.
