= 13th Street station (Sacramento) =

Light rail station in Sacramento, California

13th Street
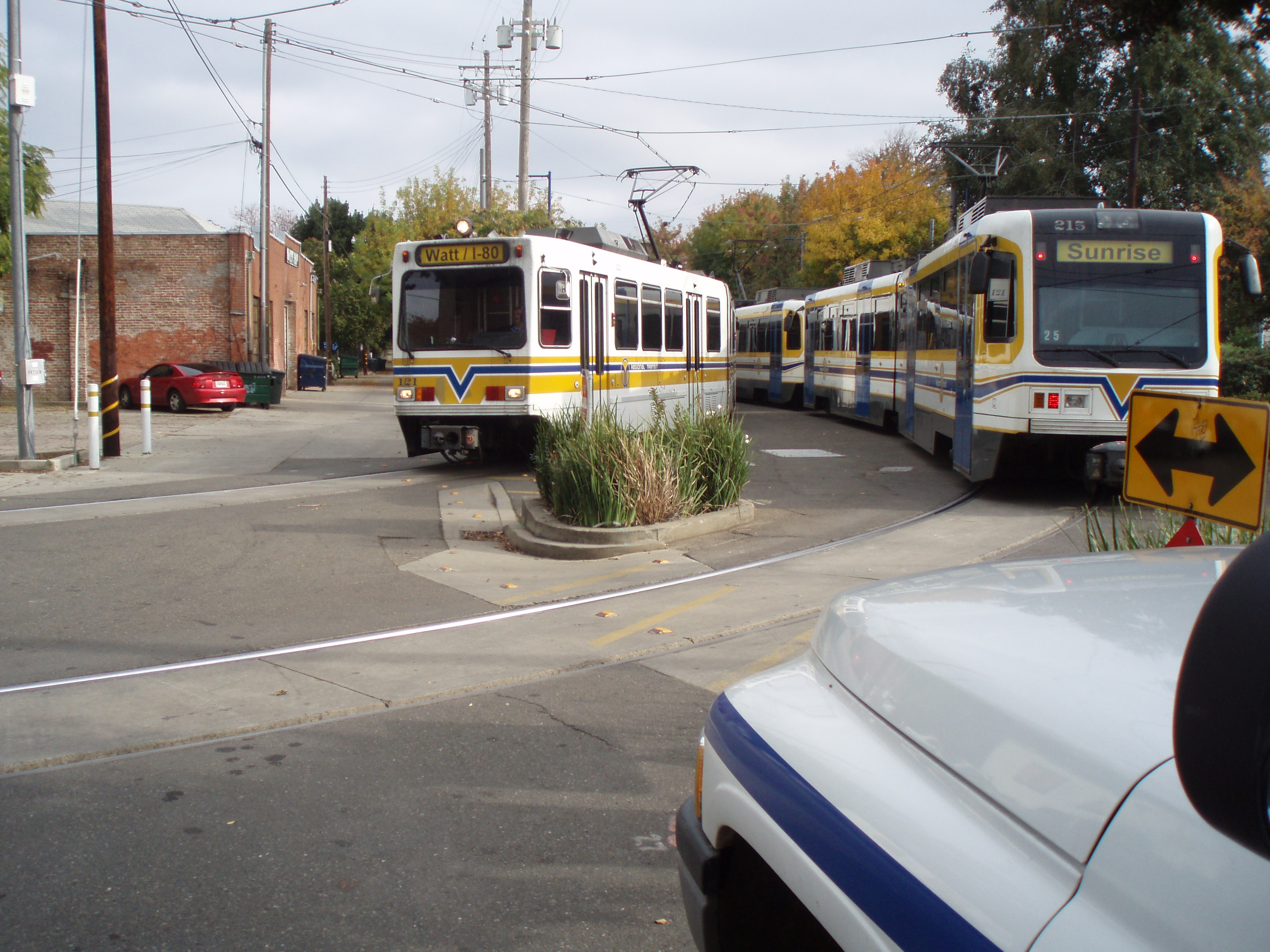
- Blue and Gold Line trains at 13th Street station

General information
- Location: Quill Alley at 13th Street; Sacramento, California; United States
- Coordinates: 38°34′16″N 121°29′37″W
- Owner: Sacramento Regional Transit District
- Platforms: 2 side platforms
- Tracks: 2

Construction
- Structure type: At-grade
- Cycle facilities: Lockers
- Accessible: Yes

History
- Opened: March 12, 1987; 39 years ago

Services
Preceding station	SacRT	Following station
Archives Plaza toward Watt/I-80	Blue Line	16th Street toward Cosumnes River College
Archives Plaza toward Sacramento Valley Station	Gold Line	16th Street toward Historic Folsom
Archives Plaza toward 7th & Richards/Township 9	Green Line	Terminus
Location

13th Street station is a side platformed SacRT light rail station in Downtown Sacramento, California, United States. The station was opened on March 12, 1987, and is operated by the Sacramento Regional Transit District. All three RT light rail lines serve the station: Gold, Blue and Green, serving as the southern terminus for the Green Line. 13th Street station was the terminal for the light rail system from March 12, 1987, until September 5, 1987, when the line was extended to Butterfield.

The station tracks run parallel to Quill Alley, which is located between Q and R Streets. The station is located between 12th and 13th Streets. Regional Transit's Customer Service and Sales Center is located just to the south of the station.

A small rail yard named the "R Street Yard" is located to the west of the station. Green Line trains turn back using a switch just east of the station.
