= 7th & Richards/Township 9 station =

Light rail station in Sacramento, California, U.S.

7th & Richards/Township 9
- 7th & Richards/Township 9 station, with a building of the May Lee State Office Complex visible in the distance

General information
- Location: Richards Boulevard and North 7th Street; Sacramento, California; United States
- Coordinates: 38°35′48″N 121°29′32″W
- Owner: Sacramento Regional Transit District
- Platforms: 2 side platforms
- Tracks: 2
- Connections: Sacramento Regional Transit: 11, 103, 106, 129; El Dorado Transit; Yuba-Sutter Transit; Greyhound Lines

Construction
- Structure type: At-grade
- Accessible: Yes

History
- Opened: June 15, 2012

Services
| Preceding station | SacRT | Following station |
|---|---|---|
| Terminus | Green Line | 7th & Railyards toward 13th Street |
Location

7th & Richards/Township 9 station is a SacRT light rail station in Sacramento, California, United States. Opened on June 15, 2012, it is operated by the Sacramento Regional Transit District and has side platforms. The station is the northern terminus of the Green Line, which is planned to extend to Sacramento International Airport. Greyhound Lines's Sacramento bus depot is located nearby at 420 Richards Boulevard.

The station is on Richards Boulevard at North 7th Street, next to the Township 9 development site in the River District, north of Downtown Sacramento. It opened with a 1.1-mile (1.8 km) extension of the Green Line, built at a cost of $44 million. It was the first new station constructed as part of the line. City officials hoped the extension would encourage redevelopment of the River District.

Green Line service was suspended between June 2025 and October 2026 during construction of 7th & Railyards station.

The May Lee State Office Complex opened across the street in April 2024. The 1.25-million-square-foot (116,000 m^{2}) complex accommodates 5,000 state employees.
