= Yolobus =

Public transit service in Yolo, Sacramento and Solano Counties, California

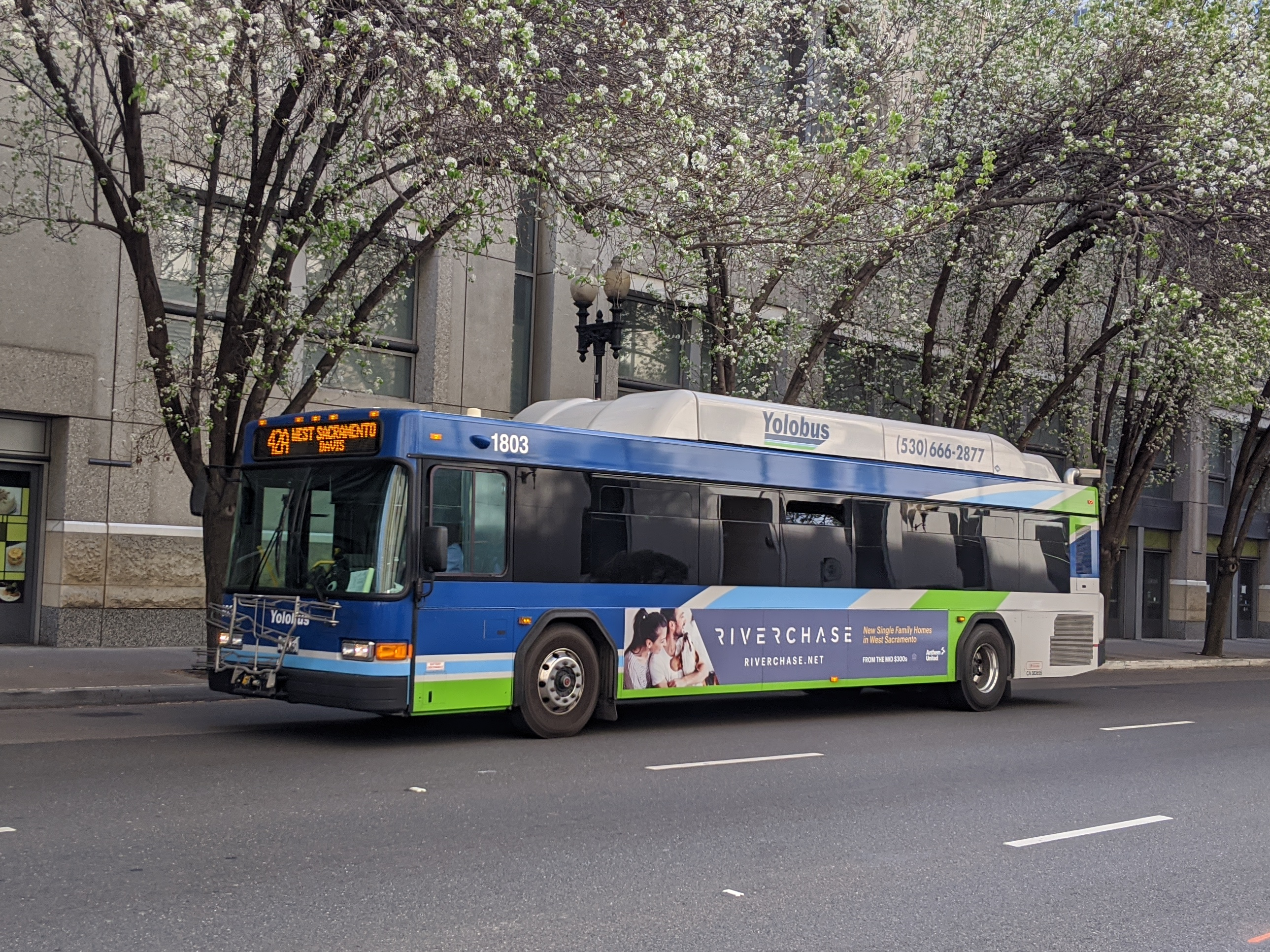
- A Yolobus Gillig Low Floor in downtown Sacramento, 2020
- Parent: Yolo County Transportation District
- Founded: 1989
- Headquarters: 350 Industrial Way; Woodland, California
- Service area: Yolo County and some Sacramento stops
- Service type: bus service, paratransit, demand-responsive transport
- Routes: 15
- Fleet: 68
- Daily ridership: 3,200 (weekdays, Q2 2026)
- Annual ridership: 532,400 (2025)
- Fuel type: Compressed natural gas
- Operator: MV Transportation
- Website: yolobus.com

Yolobus is a public transportation service which primarily serves Yolo County, California. In addition to Yolo County, Yolobus also serves parts of Sacramento.

Yolobus operates local, intercity, and express service using a fleet of 48 full-size coach buses, nine paratransit vehicles, and eleven micro-transit vehicles. Yolobus is administered by the Yolo County Transportation District (YoloTD). Bus operations were formerly contracted to Transdev since 2006 but YoloTD switched to MV Transportation in 2026. The system had a yearly ridership of 532,400 in 2025 and an average of 3,200 trips per weekday as of the second quarter of 2026.

== Fleet ==
As of 2026, the Yolobus fleet consists of the following:

- Gillig Low Floor CNG 40’
- MCI D4500CT
- OBI Orion V CNG
- OBI Orion VII CNG
- OBI Orion VII NG CNG
- Proterra Catalyst BE40

== Fares ==
Riders pay different fares depending on route. Regular and Commute route pay a base fare while express riders pay a higher express fare. Yolobus offers day passes that are also valid on SacRT.

== Routes ==
Yolobus provides bus service to Yolo County, California, and also to western Sacramento County and northeastern Solano County. The following cities are served: Sacramento, West Sacramento, Southport, Davis, Woodland, Cache Creek, Madison, Esparto, Capay, Knights Landing, Dunnigan, Yolo, Vacaville.

Most regular routes run hourly, 5–7 days a week. Commute and express routes run only at peak times in the mornings and evenings, Monday-Friday.

Many rural and commuter routes were reduced or suspended at the onset of the COVID-19 Pandemic and in 2022, as part of the YoloGo Comprehensive Operational Analysis, many of these cuts were made permanent as the new service plan favored increased headways on routes 42A and 42B and the launch of new microtransit offerings at the expense of fixed route coverage.

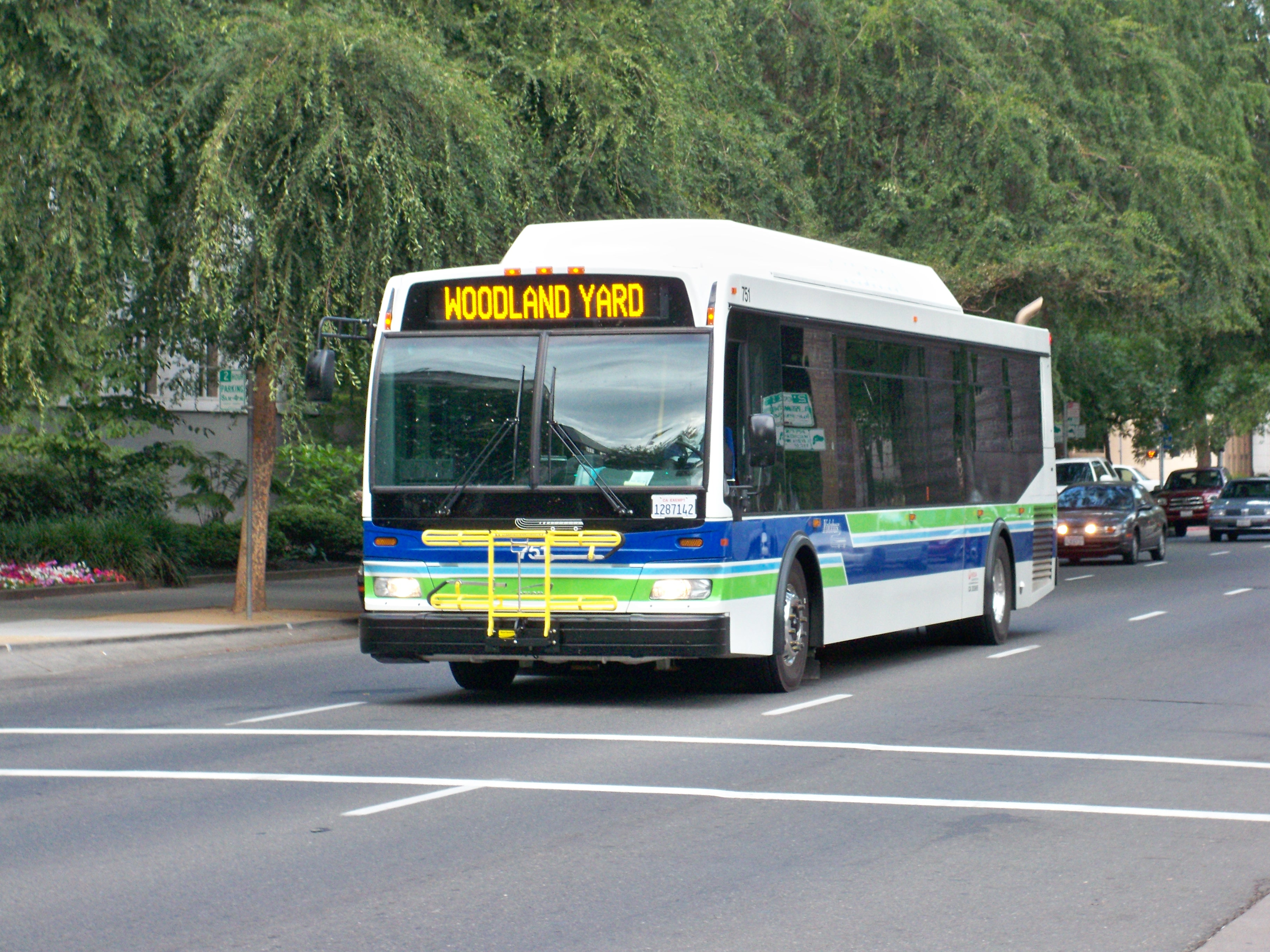
An Orion VII NG bus in Woodland, 2009

=== Regular Routes ===
- 37– Southport Local (via Jefferson / Marshall)
- 40 – West Sacramento Local (counter-clockwise) / Sacramento
- 41 – West Sacramento Local (clockwise) / Sacramento
- 42A – Intercity Loop (via Sacramento / Airport / Woodland / Davis / West Sacramento)
- 42B – Intercity Loop (via Sacramento / West Sacramento / Davis / Woodland / Airport)
- 211 – West Woodland Local (clockwise)
- 212 – East Woodland Local (counter-clockwise)
- 215 – Cache Creek Casino / Woodland
- 240 – West Sacramento / Sacramento Shuttle (via West Capitol / Harbor / Reed)

=== Commuter Routes ===
- 39 – Southport / Sacramento
- 220C – Winters / Davis
- 241 – West Sacramento / Sacramento (via West Capitol / Industrial / Enterprise)
- 242 – Woodland / Davis
- 243 – Woodland (Spring Lake) / Davis

=== Express Routes ===
- 43 – Davis / Sacramento (via F Street / Covell / Alhambra)
- 43R – Sacramento / UC Davis (reverse commute)
- 44 – South Davis / Sacramento (via Anderson / Cowell / Chiles)
- 45 – Woodland / Sacramento (via Cottonwood / Gibson / Matmor)
- 230 – West Davis / Sacramento (via Anderson / Covell / Arlington)

=== On Demand Service ===
On-demand BeeLine microtransit service is available within certain zones to the communities of Woodland, Winters, Yolo, and Knights Landing.

=== Previous Routes ===
- 45X – Spring Lake / Sacramento (via Miekle / Gum / Matmor)
- 46 – Spring Lake / Sacramento (via Miekle / Farnham / Maxwell)
- 209 – East Woodland / Springlake Shuttle
- 210 – West Woodland Local (counter-clockwise) (YoloGo Elimination)
- 214 – East Woodland Local (clockwise) (YoloGo Elimination)
- 216 – Knights Landing / Woodland (MWF, Second Saturday of each month) (YoloGo Elimination)
- 217 – Dunnigan / Yolo / Woodland (Tuesday & Thursday only) (YoloGo Elimination)
- 220 – Vacaville / Winters / Davis (via I-505 / Road 31) (YoloGo Elimination)
- 231 – Sacramento / Davis
- 232 – Davis / Sacramento (via Covell / Alhambra / Chiles)
- 340 – Raley's Landing (CalSTRS/Ziggurat) / Downtown Sacramento (only during major events at Golden 1 Center)
