= Downtown Sacramento =

District in the city of Sacramento, California

Downtown Sacramento is the central business district of the city of Sacramento, California, United States. Downtown is generally defined as the area south of the American River, east of the Sacramento River, north of Broadway, and west of 16th Street. The central business district is generally defined as north of R Street, south of H Street, east of the Sacramento River, and west of 16th Street.

== Government ==
- United States representative: Ami Bera
- State Senator: Roger Niello
- Assemblymember: Maggy Krell
- City Mayor: Kevin McCarty

== Streets ==
The streets in downtown Sacramento use a numbered and lettered grid system. These lettered streets run north and south, and numbered streets are oriented as west and east. The exceptions to this include Capitol Mall and Capitol Avenue, which are equivalent of M Street; Front Street located in Old Sacramento, which is equivalent to 1st Street; Broadway, which is equivalent to Y Street, and Alhambra Boulevard, which is equivalent to 31st Street.

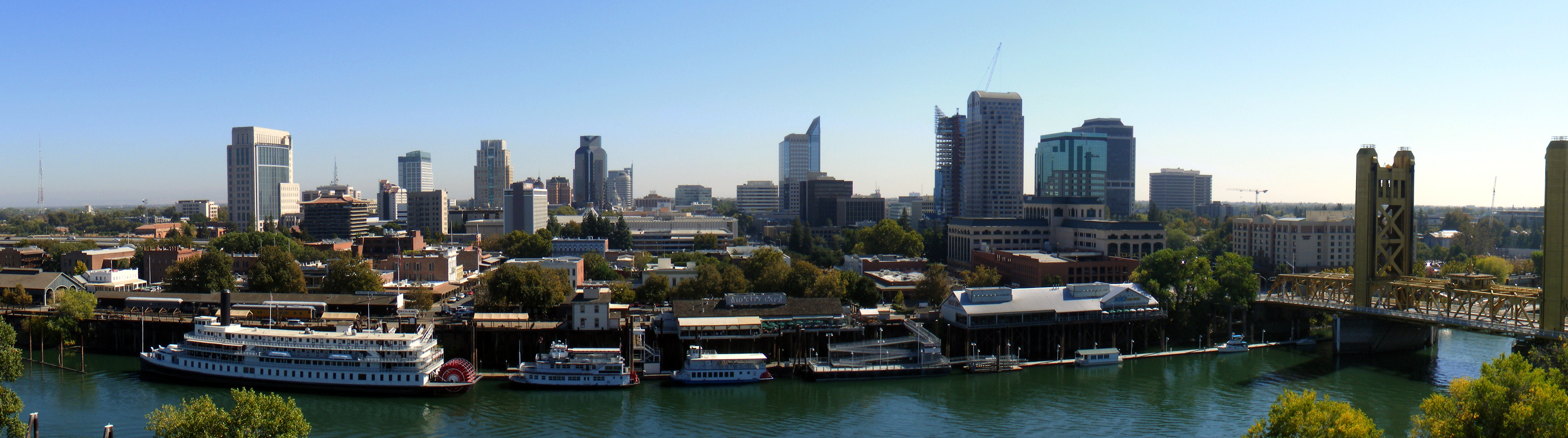
Downtown, looking east from West Sacramento

== Major features ==
Included within downtown is the California State Capitol building, the house of the California state government. The major retail and entertainment area is known as the Downtown Commons (DOCO), which includes Macy's, the Sawyer Hotel, Golden 1 Center (home of the Sacramento Kings of the National Basketball Association), and a wide variety of dining establishments and retail shops. The recently renovated and expanded Sacramento City Hall is also located downtown. The Sacramento Convention Center Complex is a major events venue downtown. The recently renovated Cathedral of the Blessed Sacrament located at 11th and K Streets. It is the largest historical cathedral west of the Sacramento River. Homeless Haven in the River District has a large homeless population.

== Pedestrian malls ==
K Street, the city's former main shopping, dining, and entertainment street, was closed to all automobile traffic in 1969 as it was converted into a pedestrian mall. 42 years later on November 12, 2011, K Street was reopened to automobile traffic, but only for four blocks between 8th and 12th Streets. It remains off limits to vehicles between 7th and 8th Streets, 12th to 13th Streets, and the alignment that runs through the present-day Downtown Commons. In November 2012, the K Street Mall was rebranded as "The Kay", and now functions as a shopping area.

Two half-block long pedestrian malls still exist in downtown, on 11th Street between J-K Alley and The Kay, and from The Kay to K-L Alley.

== Transportation ==
The Sacramento Regional Transit provides light rail and bus service through downtown. Interstate 5 separates Old Sacramento State Historic Park from the western edge of downtown. 15th and 16th Streets borders the eastern edge of downtown on a pair of one-way surface streets, both of which were formerly part of California State Route 160. The historic Sacramento Valley Amtrak Station is located just north of Downtown Commons, and is serviced by Amtrak Capitol Corridor and three other routes, in addition to being the western terminus of the Gold Line of RT's light rail. The return of streetcars to downtown is currently being evaluated in a joint effort by both Sacramento and West Sacramento. Interstate 80 Business (Capital City Freeway), California State Route 99 and U.S. Route 50 all converge into the downtown area, while Interstate 80 bypasses downtown to the north.

== Theaters ==
Near the convention center are the Crest Theatre at 10th and K Streets, and an IMAX theater at 13th and K Streets. Downtown Commons also has a large Century Theatres multiplex cinema. The Sacramento Community Center Theatre is located on 13th and L Streets, and has regular performances by Broadway Sacramento, Sacramento Philharmonic Orchestra, the Sacramento Opera, and The Sacramento Ballet. The UC Davis Health Pavilion (known as the Wells Fargo Pavilion from 2003 to 2021 and Music Circus prior to 2003), located on 14th and H Streets, provides a unique "theater in the round" live theater and musical experience. The historic Memorial Auditorium, at 16th and J Streets, holds many performances from comedy acts, traveling bands, and speakers. The Assembly Music Hall, located at 10th and K Streets, is a 200-seat venue, offering musical comedies in an upscale setting with table service.

== Notable residents ==
- Jim Beall - California State Senator
- Jerry Brown - Former Governor of California had a unit in the Elliott Building
- Edward Hernandez - California State Senator
- Henry Stern - California State Senator
