= Sacramento Valley Electric Railroad =

Electric interurban railway in the U.S. state of California

The Sacramento Valley Electric Railroad, later known as the Dixon Branch, was a short-lived electric interurban railway in the U.S. state of California. It began operation on October 10, 1914, and ran for 11.8 miles (19.0 km) between Dixon and Rio Junction (or Dixon Junction); it ran from a point on the main line known as Olcott (or Dixon Junction), that was located in Solano County between Sacramento and Rio Vista Junction. The line was run by the Oakland, Antioch, & Eastern Railway, and was abandoned on August 9, 1917, after decreasing revenue.

== History ==
The railway was incorporated on May 4, 1912, by Melville Dozier Jr. to construct a railway line between Redding and Rio Junction (The Oakland, Antioch, & Eastern Railway interchange), via Dixon, Woodland, Marysville, Colusa, Hamilton City, and Red Bluff. Construction began somewhere around 1913 after surveying was completed between Red Bluff and Rio Junction for the Sacramento Valley West Side Electric Railway, who later reorganized into the Sacramento Valley Electric Railroad after failed attempts to encourage investment. Originally, the line would have interchanged with the Vallejo & Northern (who intended to build a line between Napa and Sacramento) at Dixon. Equipment and tracks was provided by the Oakland, Antioch, & Eastern Railway, who held a large share in the Sacramento Valley Electric Railroad's shares.

Of the planned 193-mile-long (311 km) route, only 11.8 miles (19.0 km) were built between Rio Junction (later renamed Olcott) and Dixon. The Sacramento Valley Electric Railroad leased the service to the Oakland, Antioch, & Eastern Railway, and gave forth portions of their monthly revenue to the other line. The railway began service on October 10, 1914, with the first official train being led by company officials. It was originally intended by its planner, Melville Dozier, to be operated as Vallejo and Northern and would run up the west side of the Sacramento Vallejo from Dixon Junction, through Dixon and then continue north to Woodland and terminate in Marysville. Only the track portion from Dixon Junction to Dixon was ever built. From the start, the line was unprofitable as it traversed flat unpopulated land. Between March 1 and June 8, 1915, there were only 56 passengers recorded who actually traveled the line. Operating expenses were quite high, while revenue was very low.

The Oakland, Antioch, & Eastern Railway applied to the Railroad Commission to abandon the line on July 23, 1917; permission was granted to abandon the line in the same month. It last ran on August 9, before it was torn up and partially salvaged by the Tidewater Southern Railway for its electrified line.

The station agent at Dixon regularly had to send mail reminding Oakland, Antioch, & Eastern officials to pay him, as the company often avoided this due to the unprofitable nature of the line.

== See also ==
- Northern Electric Railway-Marysville and Colusa Branch
