= 12th & I station =

12th & I
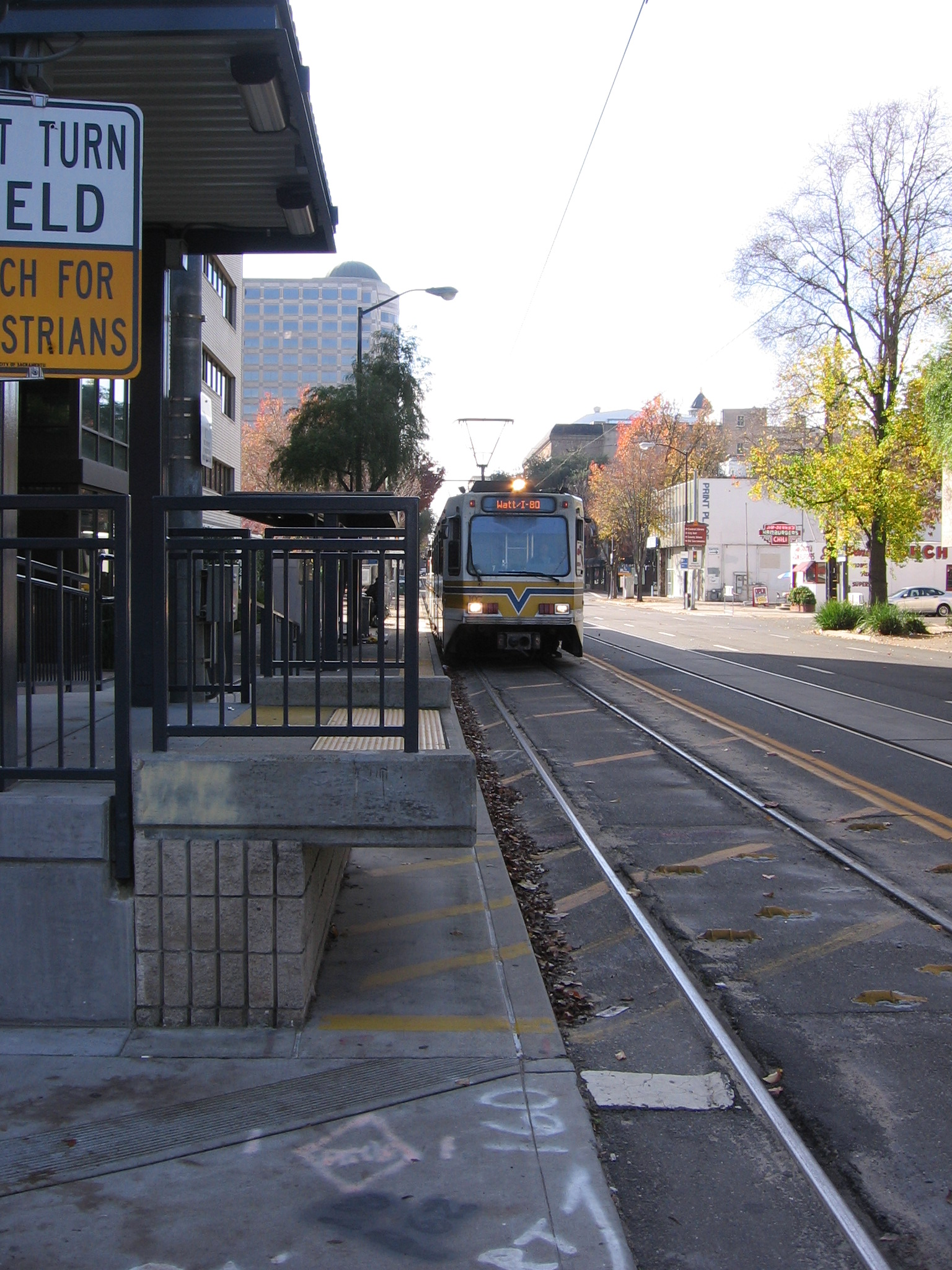
- 12th & I station platform with northbound train approaching

General information
- Location: 12th Street at I Street; Sacramento, California; United States
- Coordinates: 38°34′53″N 121°29′24″W
- Owner: Sacramento Regional Transit District
- Platforms: 1 side platform
- Tracks: 2
- Connections: Sacramento Regional Transit: 129, E10, E11, E12, E13, E14, E15, E16, E17, E18; Roseville Transit: 1, 2, 3, 4, 5, 6, 7, 8, 9, 10, 11; South County Transit: Galt – Sacramento Commuter Express

Construction
- Structure type: At-grade
- Accessible: Northbound only

History
- Opened: March 12, 1987

Services
Preceding station	SacRT	Following station
Alkali Flat/La Valentina toward Watt/I-80	Blue Line	11th & K Cathedral Square One-way operation
Alkali Flat/La Valentina toward Watt/I-80	Blue Line	10th & K Cathedral Square toward Cosumnes River College
Location

12th & I station is an at-grade light rail station on the Blue Line of the SacRT light rail system operated by the Sacramento Regional Transit District. The station is located alongside 12th Street at its intersection with I Street, after which the station is named, in the city of Sacramento, California.

Due to the tracks running in both directions on a one-way thoroughfare (12th Street is one-way southbound), wheelchair users can only access northbound trains from the adjacent curbside platform.

The stops are located adjacent to the former Sacramento Union Traction Depot, where the Sacramento Northern Railway interchanged with Central California Traction Company interurban services.
