= Lafayette–Moraga Regional Trail =

Rail trail in California

The Lafayette–Moraga Regional Trail is a 7.65-mile (12.31 km) pedestrian, bicycle, and equestrian path which runs between the cities of Lafayette and Moraga in Contra Costa county, California. It was one of the first rail trails to be built in California.

== Route ==
The trail begins at the Olympic Boulevard staging area in Lafayette. Most of the trail is parallel to St. Mary's Road. It can be accessed from the Lafayette BART station, which is less than a mile from where the trail meets 3rd Street and Moraga Boulevard.

The trail is one part of the Lamorinda Trail Loop. The trail makes a connection to the Briones to Las Trampas Regional Trail via 3rd Street in Lafayette.

It passes through the Moraga Commons park in Moraga and near the Lafayette Community Park in Lafayette. It runs past several schools, Saint Mary's College and Joaquin Moraga Intermediate School in Moraga, and Lafayette Elementary School in Lafayette.

The trail ends at the Valle Vista staging area in Moraga, which is on EBMUD land. An $10 EBMUD trail use permit is required to hike in this area. The Valle Vista staging area connects to multiple EBMUD hiking trails, the 2.9-mile (4.7 km) Redwood Trail (connecting to the East Ridge trail in Redwood Regional Park), and the 6.2-mile (10.0 km) Rocky Ridge Trail.

The trail is maintained by the East Bay Regional Park District. It is a wheelchair accessible paved trail.

== History ==
The Lafayette-Moraga trail was built on the Sacramento Northern Railway corridor which was once used to carry redwood lumber from Oakland to Sacramento. The corridor was first used by mule trains, and then by steam trains. The corridor then passed into a utility easement, before being converted into a paved multi-use recreational trail with the cooperation of local communities and utility districts.

=== January 2016 closure ===
A portion of the trail near the Valle Vista staging area has been closed since January 2016, due to a mudslide where Canyon Bridge crosses Moraga Creek. The closure is beyond downtown Moraga, and the main part of the trail between Lafayette and Moraga is still open. However, it is no longer possible to use the trail to reach the Valle Vista staging area in Moraga. The neighboring Canyon Road Bridge was closed in April 2017 but was reopened in November 2017, and it should be possible to reach the Valle Vista staging area via Canyon Road.
