= Hotel Stockton =

- U.S. National Register of Historic Places
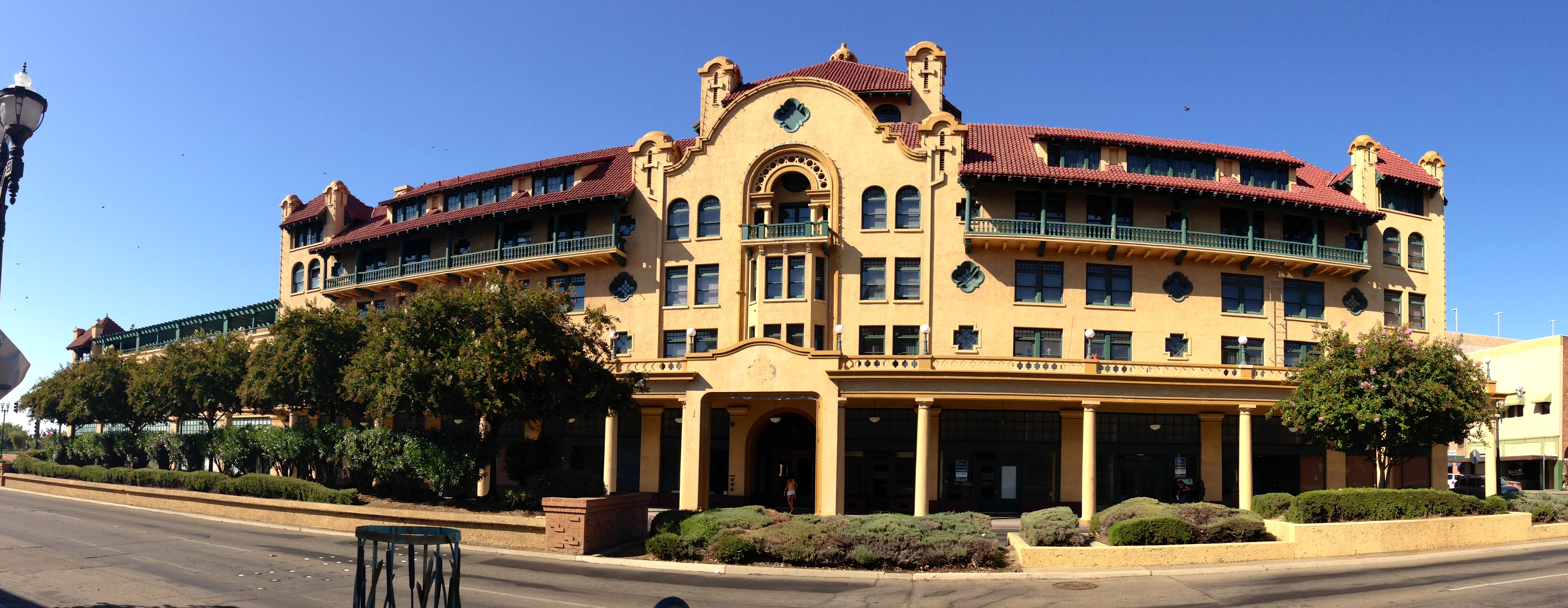
- Hotel Stockton in 2012

- Location within California Location within the United States
- Location: 133 E. Weber Ave., Stockton, California
- Coordinates: 37°57′15″N 121°17′18″W
- Area: 0.7 acres (0.28 ha)
- Built: 1910
- Architect: Brown, Edgar B.
- Architectural style: Mission/spanish Revival
- NRHP reference No.: 81000174
- Added to NRHP: April 1, 1981

The Hotel Stockton is a Mission Revival Style building located at 133 E. Weber Avenue in Stockton, California. The hotel, which opened in 1910, was designed as a grand hotel with 252 rooms and became popular among visitors to Stockton, especially traveling entertainers. It served as an interchange for the interurban lines which emanated from Stockton: the Central California Traction Company and the Tidewater Southern Railway. In 1912, the City of Stockton moved its City Hall into the hotel, where it remained until 1926. The building's role in local government ultimately outlasted its role as a hotel; when the hotel closed for business in 1960, the county courthouse relocated to the building for the next four years while a new courthouse was built. The building served yet another branch of government in 1976, when San Joaquin County purchased the building as office space for its Public Administration Department.

The Hotel Stockton was added to the National Register of Historic Places on April 1, 1981.

Preceding station	Central California Traction Company	Following station
Aurora Street toward Sacramento	Main Line	Terminus
Terminus	Stockton - Mineral Baths	Mineral Baths Terminus
Preceding station	Western Pacific Railroad	Following station
Terminus	Tidewater Southern Railway main line	Washington Street toward Modesto

== See also ==
- Stockton waterfront near the Hotel
