= Northern Electric Railway—Marysville and Colusa Branch =

Railway branch

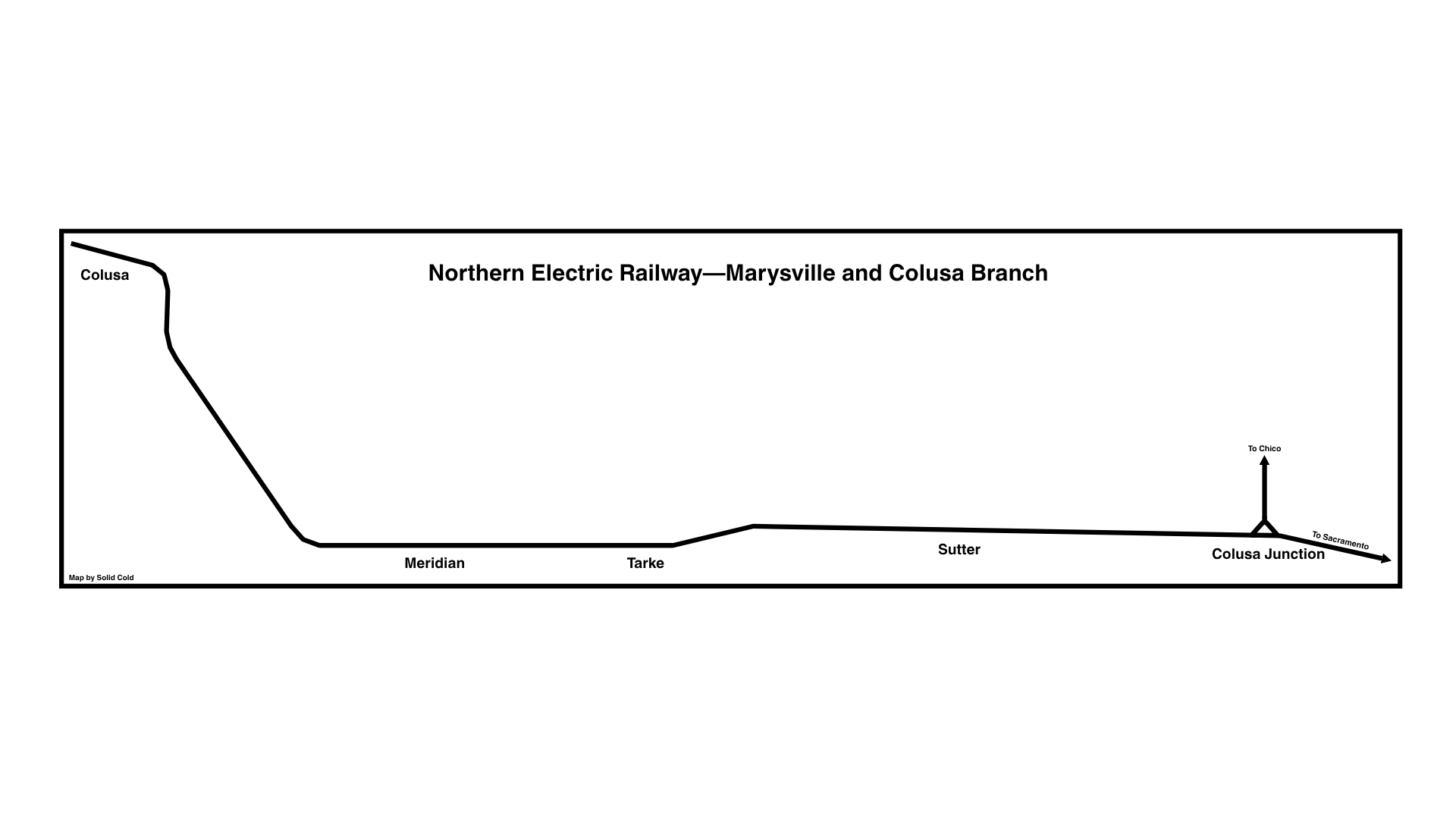
A diagram of the line.

The Northern Electric Railway—Marysville and Colusa Branch was an interurban branch railroad in California, which ran from a junction with the Northern Electric Railway mainline (later the Chico Branch) near Yuba City (Colusa Junction) then west for 22.39 miles (36.03 km) to Colusa. The company was incorporated on June 6, 1910. Construction of the branch commenced in December 1911 and was completed on June 13, 1913. The Northern Electric Railway—Marysville and Colusa Branch operated under lease to the Northern Electric Railway.

On June 30, 1918, the Northern Electric Railway was sold to the Sacramento Northern Railroad, which would later become the Sacramento Northern Railway. Passenger service along the Colusa Branch ended on October 31, 1940.

This line not be confused with the Colusa and Lake Railroad line which ran between Colusa and Colusa Junction, present day Lurline Avenue. This Colusa Junction is west of Colusa at Old Highway 99 and Lurline Avenue.

== Route ==
- Colusa Junction (connection with Northern Electric's Chico-Sacramento mainline)
- Sutter
- Tarke
- Meridian
- Colusa

The line branched west from Yuba City and ran through Sutter where it would head slightly southwest towards Tarke, crossing the Butte Slough lowlands over a large trestle. The line would then arrive in Meridian on an elevated embankment through the town. This is also where the line would cross the Sacramento River, passing over on a bridge shared with Highway 20. The line would then head northwest and arrive in Colusa. The line in Colusa ran along Market Street and terminated at a balloon track at the corner of Market and 13th street.

== Abandonment ==
The track between Tarke and Colusa was abandoned prior to 1974, due to this the unique bridge in Meridian was replaced with a road only swing bridge. The branch was later known as the Tarke Branch. Abandonment of the Tarke Branch was applied for in the early 1980s by Sacramento Northern's parent, Western Pacific Railroad. The track was eventually abandoned between Sutter and Tarke, constituting the demolition of the trestle. In 1985 the former SN mainline between Live Oak and Colusa Junction was shut down by Western Pacific's successor, the Union Pacific Railroad. This meant the only connection the branch had to the National rail network was via the bridge over the Feather River into Marysville, which connected to the former WP mainline. The UP filed to abandon the line from Sutter to Harter Road in Yuba City in 1994 but the request was denied for a year. In 1996 UP filed again for abandonment and this time it was approved for. After this the last customer on the line was the Harter Tomato Company. On April 20, 2004, the UP filed to abandon the remaining 3.39 miles of the line (now known as the Yuba City Industrial Lead) between Harter Road and the connection to the mainline. UP cited a lack of traffic as a reason for the abandonment as only a single carload had been handled the year before. The abandonment was approved and the line was soon ripped up. The bridge over the Feather River remained however, along with the berm that brought the tracks down to street level. The berm would be leveled in 2018 due to a highway widening project.

== Remnants and current usage ==
Traces of the right of way can be seen in multiple places, portions of the roadbed east of the grade crossing on Acacia Avenue in Sutter have been converted to a mixed-use bicycle/walking trail, while the rest of the right of way within Yuba City still has ballast. At Colusa Junction the footprint of the former wye can clearly be seen between Redding Avenue and Tierra Buena Road. In Tarke an abutment for the former trestle is still standing and further west in Meridian, Highway 20 utilizes the old elevated grade after a realignment in 1977. The rest of the line to Colusa is visible in parts but large sections have been redeveloped or encroached upon by nearby farms. Two depots on the line still stand, Close Lumber in Sutter utilizes the old depot left behind by the SN as an office, while the former depot in Meridian is now a private residence. Two boxcars are also landlocked on the line, one is located in Sutter and the other is in Tarke, both are missing their trucks and are most likely being utilized by local industries for storage.

== See also ==
- Sacramento Northern Railway
- Dixon Branch
