= Key System Mole =

Former rail and ferry pier on the San Francisco Bay

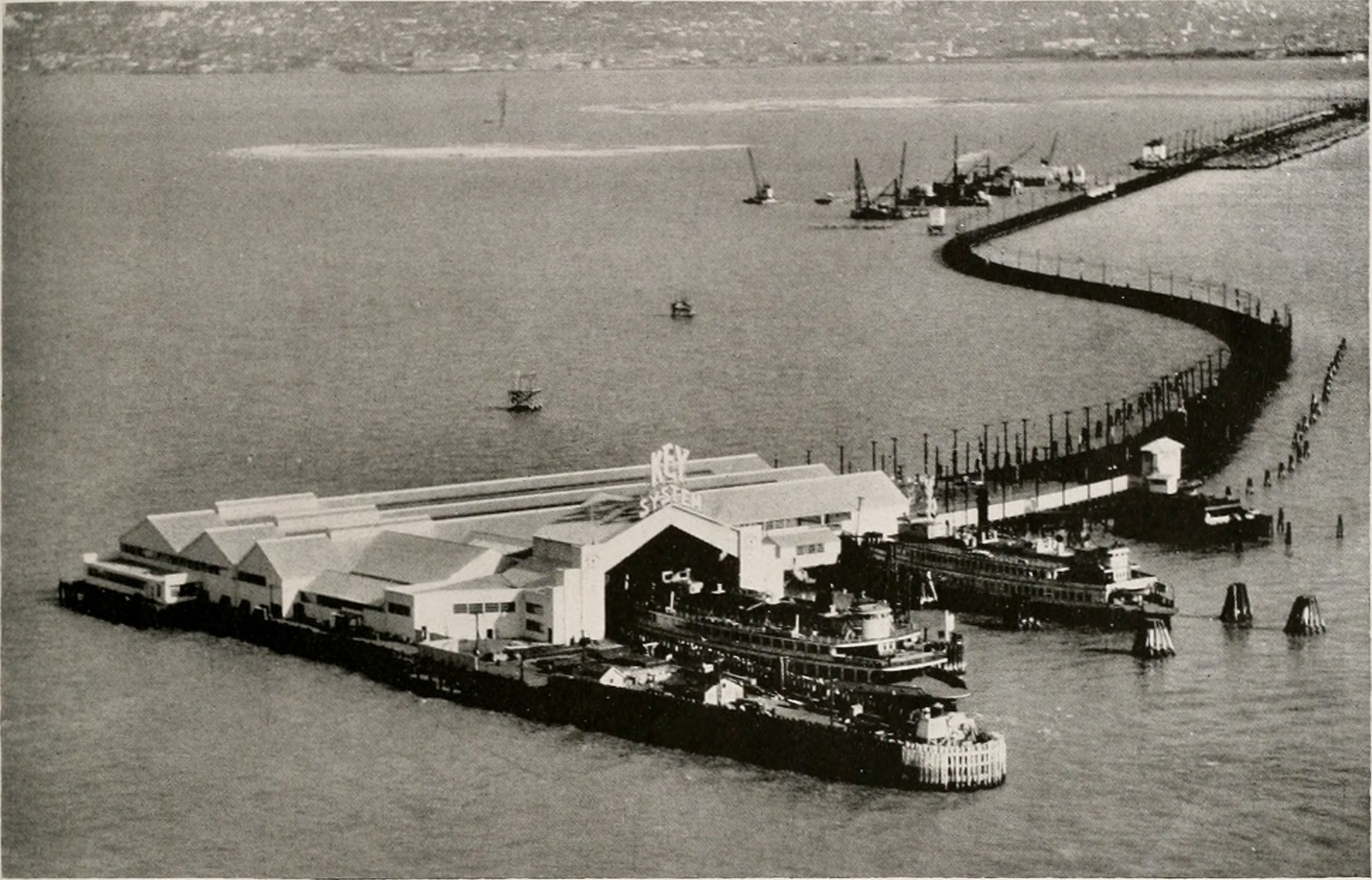
- The Mole in 1933, recently rebuilt after a fire

General information
- Location: Oakland, California
- Coordinates: 37.8155°N 122.3451°W
- Elevation: Sea level
- Owner: Key System
- Operator: Key System; Sacramento Northern Railway
- Tracks: 9

Construction
- Architect: Walter J. Mathews (first Ferry Terminal)
- Architectural style: Medieval

Other information
- Status: Partially demolished

History
- Opened: October 26, 1903
- Closed: October 29, 1939
- Rebuilt: 1908–1916, 1933
- Electrified: Overhead line, 600 V DC

Services
Preceding station	Key System	Following station
Terminus	A	Hollis Street toward Oak & 12th
Terminus	B	Hollis Street toward Underhill
Terminus	C	Hollis Street toward Oakland Avenue
Terminus	E	Hollis Street toward Claremont
Terminus	F	Hollis Street toward Alcatraz Avenue
Terminus	H	Hollis Street toward Monterey & Colusa
San Francisco Ferry Building Terminus	Connection to San Francisco via Ferry	Terminus
Preceding station	Sacramento Northern Railway	Following station
Terminus	Main Line	Oakland toward Chico
Location

The Key System Mole was an interurban train and ferry pier on the San Francisco Bay. It served as an interchange point in the East Bay for Key System passengers traveling to and from San Francisco. Opened to passengers in 1903, the facility was upgraded several times until 1933 when it was partially destroyed by a fire. All train service ended in 1939, and segments of the structure were partially reused in construction of the San Francisco–Oakland Bay Bridge.

== History ==
=== Opening, popularity, and expansion ===
The troubled California and Nevada Railroad had begun construction of a ferry pier in Oakland, but its plans were never realized. Francis Marion "Borax" Smith purchased the railroad in order to gain access to its right of way and waterfront operations, as well as use the abandoned pier as a starting point for his own passenger mole.

Transbay service began on October 26, 1903. The original station building was designed by Walter J. Mathews and featured three tracks with one ferry slip. Switches were initially operated track-side until February 20, 1905 when a tower was installed.

As demand for the service greatly exceeded expectations, the terminal was enlarged several times beginning very shortly after opening. The number of track ends had expanded to six by July 1907 with two more being readied for use. The hasty building methods employed during the initial construction were also becoming apparent at this time. The original approach trestle was built with supports very far apart and potentially reused part of the original California and Nevada Railroad structure; this was replaced with landfill in 1908. By 1916, most of the trestle bridge had been replaced with causeway, except a 3,800-foot (1,200 m) section connecting to the ferry terminal. The rebuilt approach to the ferry terminal was designed to allow for construction of a loop at a future time. Three ferry slips were operating by the 1920s.

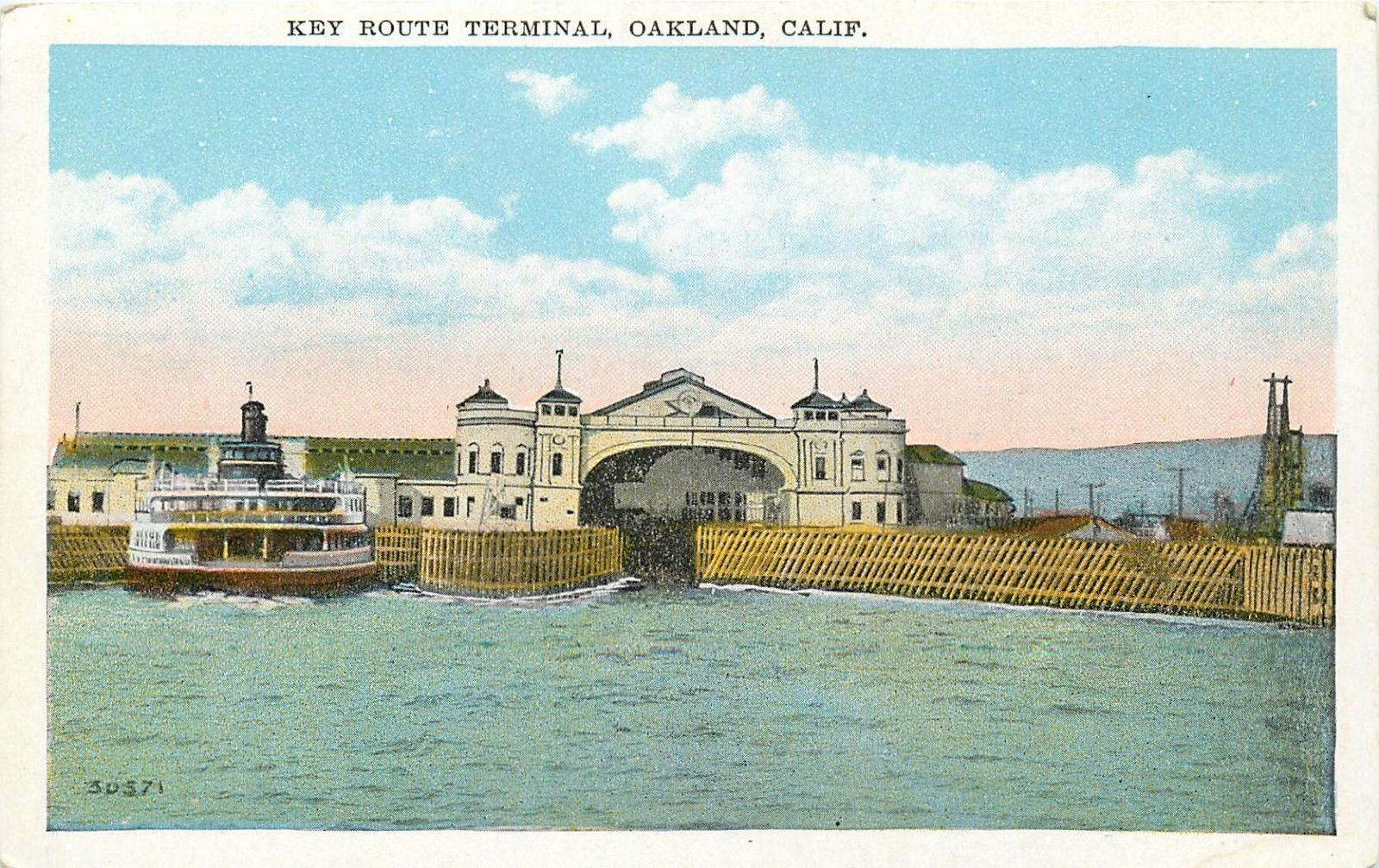
Postcard featuring the ferry slips at the terminal building, c. 1915–1930

The Oakland, Antioch & Eastern Railway began running interurban cars from Sacramento to the mole starting in September 1913. This railway would go on to be consolidated into the Sacramento Northern Railway, offering services as far north as Chico and Oroville.

On December 4, 1924, one train collided with a stationary train at 40 miles per hour (64 km/h), killing six people and injuring 45 more.

The Key System expanded their maintenance facility along the causeway in 1930 with the construction of the Bridge Yard building.

=== Destruction and rebuild before bridge service ===
In May 1933, an explosion and the ensuing fire destroyed the station building, 500 yards (460 m) of pier, the ferry Peralta, and 14 cars. The cause of the fire remains a mystery. The Key System received a $1.1-million insurance settlement for the disaster. (Note: $27.4 million in 2025 adjusted for inflation) With bridge construction looming, the pier and station were rebuilt as cheaply as possible to maintain service. A temporary steel structure served as the new station building. The line and station were rebuilt slightly to the south to accommodate bridge construction.

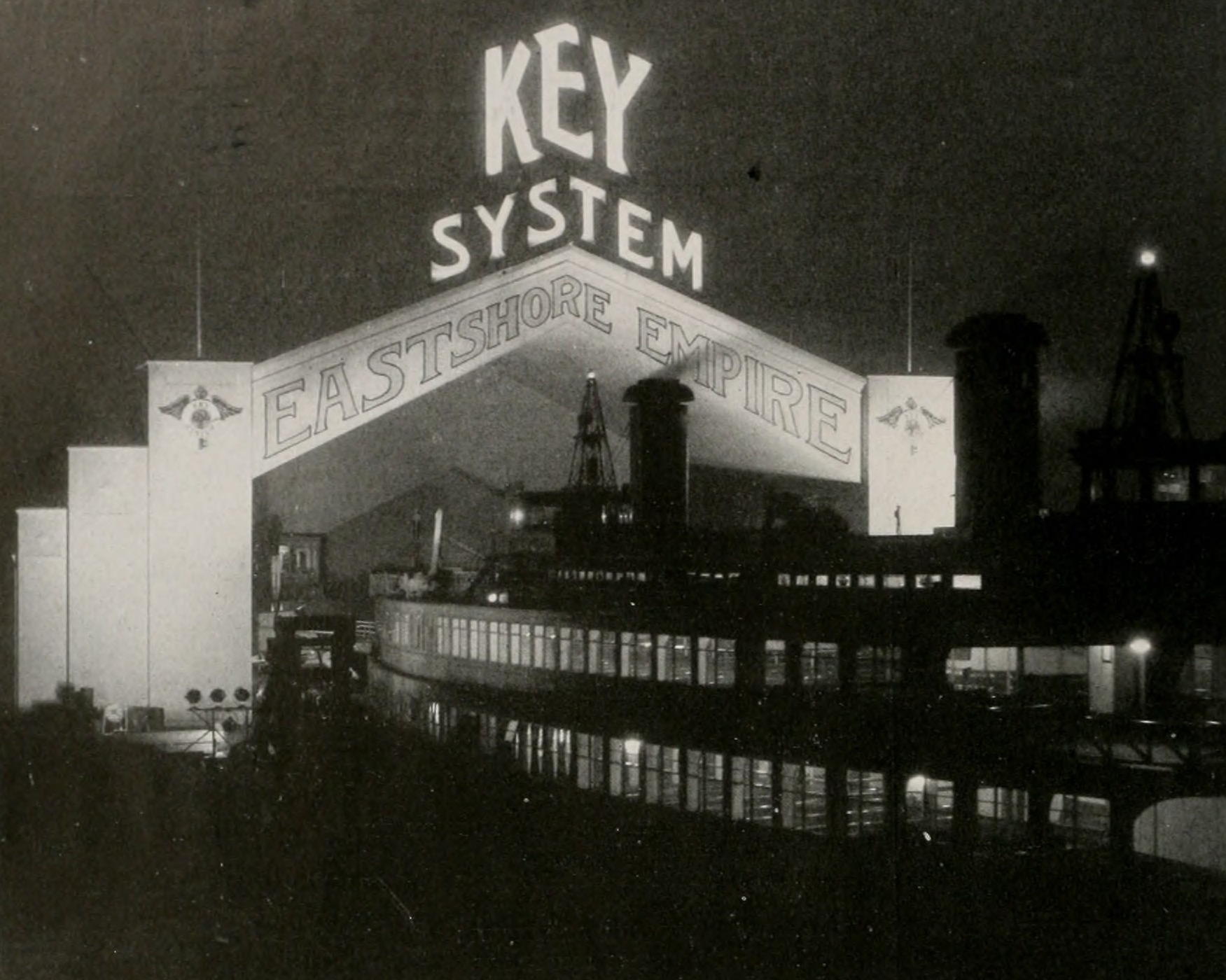
An evening view of a ferry arriving at the terminal, 1933

Initial concepts to build a bridge between Oakland and San Francisco included a design to extend the Key System Mole to San Francisco. Final plans for the San Francisco–Oakland Bay Bridge included building the Oakland approach adjacent to the mole. After the fire, the California Toll Bridge Authority filed to condemn and acquire part of the causeway as well as the property of the former terminal. Transbay service was transferred to the bridge on January 15, 1939, though Key System cars and ferries continued running to serve the Golden Gate International Exposition until the season's end on October 29. (Ferry service from the East Bay was not resumed for the 1940 season, with buses providing transportation to the East Bay that year.)

=== Eventual fate ===
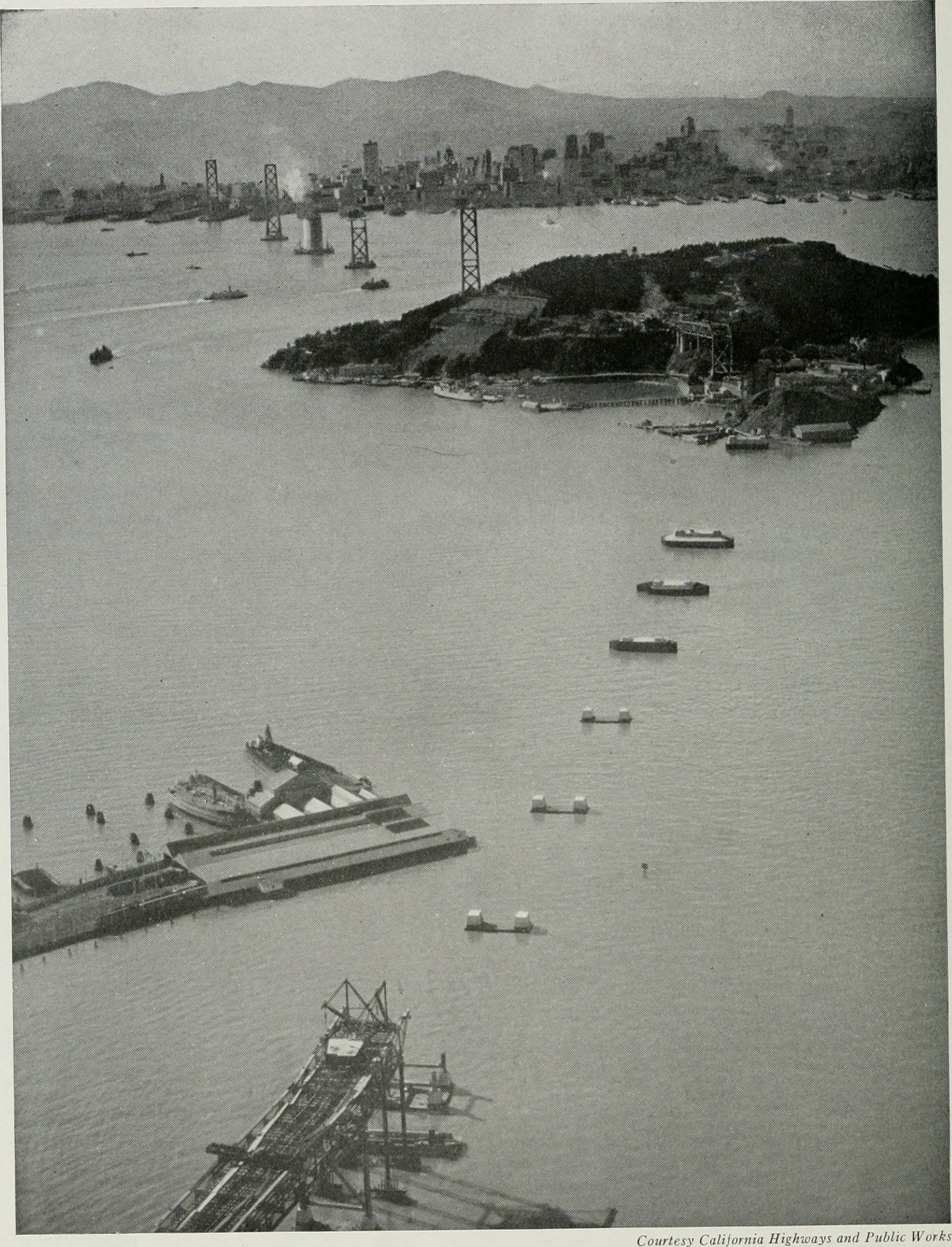
The San Francisco–Oakland Bay Bridge under construction adjacent to the Mole in 1934.

The Mole was almost entirely dismantled over the following decades. The steel structure which served as the station building after 1933 was sold and moved to Oakland, where it served as part of a steel company's processing plant into the 1980s. About 600,000 board feet (1,400 m^{3}) of timber was salvaged from the pier for reuse in construction of the Shipyard Railway after America's entry into World War II. Portions of the causeway exist as landfill approaching the Bay Bridge. The Bridge Yard building was restored by the California Department of Transportation in the late 2010s and serves as an events space. The Union Pacific (former Southern Pacific) underpass is utilized as limited roadway access to the East Bay Municipal Utility District Oakland Wastewater Treatment Plant.

== Design ==
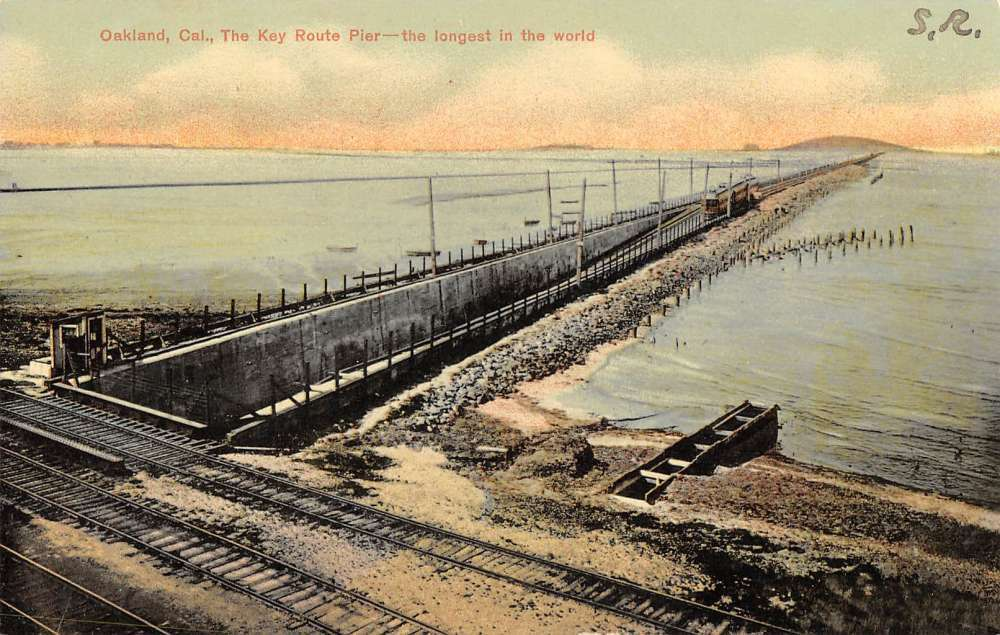
The Mole as seen from the Key System's underpass of the Southern Pacific mainline c. 1907–1915. While this underpass still exists, land reclamation has moved the bayshore further west.

The original wooden trestle extended 17,000 feet (5,200 m) into the Bay. After being rebuilt between 1906 and 1916, the trestle segment had been shortened to 3,800 feet (1,200 m), the rest being built up with landfill to become a causeway.

The first passenger depot was designed in a medieval style by architect Walter J. Mathews, with Howard C. Holmes serving as consulting engineer. One particularly good feature of the building was that it provided for each boat to run under a shed, which covered about a third of the boat, and thus kept embarking and disembarking passengers from being exposed to inclement weather. The trains, approaching the building, ran from the open track into a three-track train shed, with trussed roof, 65 feet (20 m) wide and 358 feet 6 inches (109.27 m) long. The embarking passengers passed from the trains into waiting rooms at each side of the lower deck apron and wait there until the boat was unloaded before being allowed to pass onto it. At the outer sides of the two waiting rooms were inclines leading to aprons that connected with the upper deck of the boat. One of these was used for loading, the other for unloading. In the boat shed were located the hydraulic accumulator and pumps which operated the aprons. Rooms were provided in the building for sleeping quarters of the boat crews, for the superintendent's office, and repair shop.

The Mole's precarious length and distinctively-shaped ferry slips were the inspiration for the "Key System" moniker; W. F. Kelly, the railroad's first manager, believed their depiction on maps resembled the shaft and teeth of a key. (Note: e.g. see Image:Altschlü2 f1024 hdr sw var2m text.jpg)
