= Sacramento Northern Railway =

Former electric railway in California

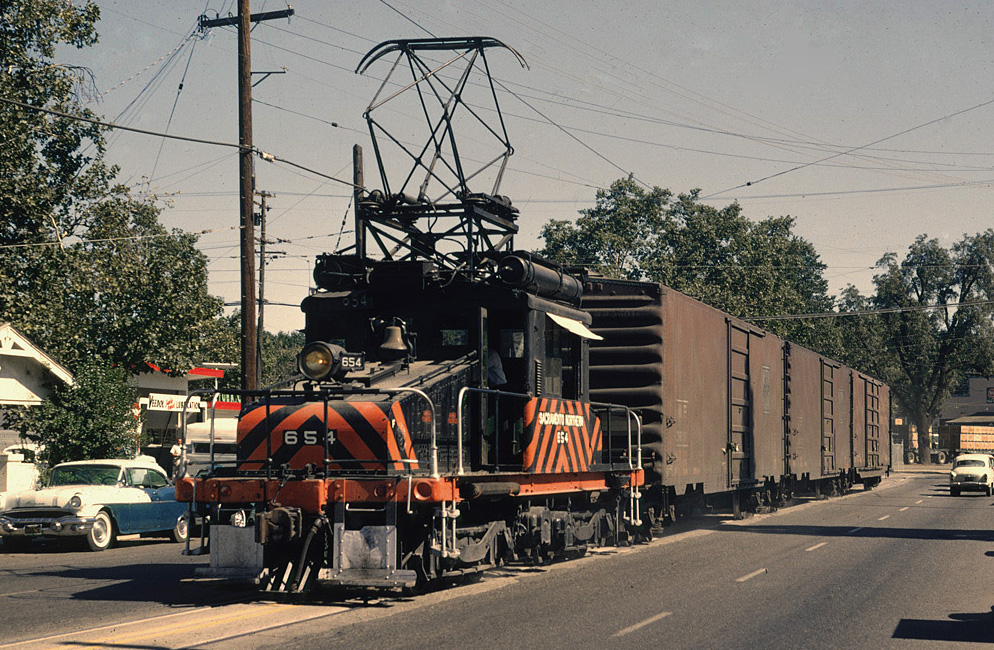
- A GE Steeplecab street-running in Yuba City, California in 1964

Overview
- Headquarters: Marysville, California
- Reporting mark: SN
- Locale: Central and Northern California
- Dates of operation: 1918–1983
- Predecessor: Northern Electric Railway
- Successor: Western Pacific Railroad

Technical
- Track gauge: 4 ft 8 1/2 in (1,435 mm) standard gauge
- Electrification: See electrification below.

The Sacramento Northern Railway (reporting mark SN) was a 183-mile (295 km) electric interurban railway that connected Chico in northern California with Oakland via the state capital, Sacramento. In its operation it ran directly on the streets of Oakland, Sacramento, Yuba City, Chico, and Woodland. This involved multiple car trains making sharp turns at street corners and obeying traffic signals. Once in open country, SN's passenger trains ran at fairly fast speeds. With its shorter route and lower fares, the SN provided strong competition to the Southern Pacific and Western Pacific Railroad for passenger business and freight business between Oakland and Sacramento. North of Sacramento, both passenger and freight business was less due to the small town agricultural nature of the region and competition from the paralleling Southern Pacific Railroad.

The SN had been two separate interurban companies connecting at Sacramento until 1925. The Oakland, Antioch, and Eastern Railway was a catenary wire powered line that ran from Oakland through a tunnel in the Oakland hills to Moraga, Walnut Creek, Concord, Pittsburg, to Sacramento. It was renamed the San Francisco–Sacramento Railroad briefly. The Northern Electric Railway was a third rail powered line that ran from Sacramento north through Marysville and Yuba City to Chico. It was renamed the Sacramento Northern Railroad in 1914. In 1928, the two lines combined to become the Sacramento Northern Railway under control of the Western Pacific Railroad which operated it as a separate entity. An extensive multiple-car passenger service operated from Oakland to Chico until 1941 including providing dining car service on some trains. Passenger traffic was heaviest from Sacramento to Oakland. Freight operation using electric locomotives continued into the 1960s.

== History ==
=== Vallejo and Northern Railroad ===
The Vallejo and Northern Railroad was a proposed 58.15-mile (93.58 km) interurban railway line between Vallejo and Woodland, California. The company was incorporated on November 9, 1906, promoted by the same person who put forward the Dixon Branch. Terminal sites were purchased in Fairfield, Suisun, Vacaville, and Vallejo, California. Additionally, the railroad also began planning an extension from Woodland to Sacramento, going on to acquire franchise rights for running on Sacramento streets and purchasing property in Woodland. Despite the swift property acquisition, construction had not commenced, reportedly a result of the Panic of 1907. The company was merged into the Sacramento Northern Railway predecessor Northern Electric Railway in 1909 after Northern Electric floated $10 million ($358 million in 2025 adjusted for inflation) worth of bonds in Amsterdam. A single tram lettered Vallejo & Northern # 1 operated in downtown Sacramento from November 15, 1911 until 1914. Construction of what would become the Sacramento Northern Vaca Valley Line began in 1913; and line opened for service on May 16, 1914. Northern Electric combination cars numbered 103, 104, and 22 offered passenger service over this isolated branch until passenger service was abandoned in 1926. Motor #701 pulled carloads of freight transferred from barges and shallow-draft steamboats at Suisun. The line was connected to Sacramento Northern's main line via a new branch between Vacaville and Creed in 1930. Western Pacific Railroad proposed extending the Willotta branch of their Sacramento Northern subsidiary through Jamison Canyon to connect with the Petaluma and Santa Rosa Railroad (P&SR) as late as 1932, but the Great Depression and Northwestern Pacific Railroad purchase of the P&SR prevented such expansion. The connecting line through Cordero was relocated during construction of Travis Air Force Base in 1942, and diesel locomotives replaced electric operation in 1947.

=== Northern Electric Railway ===
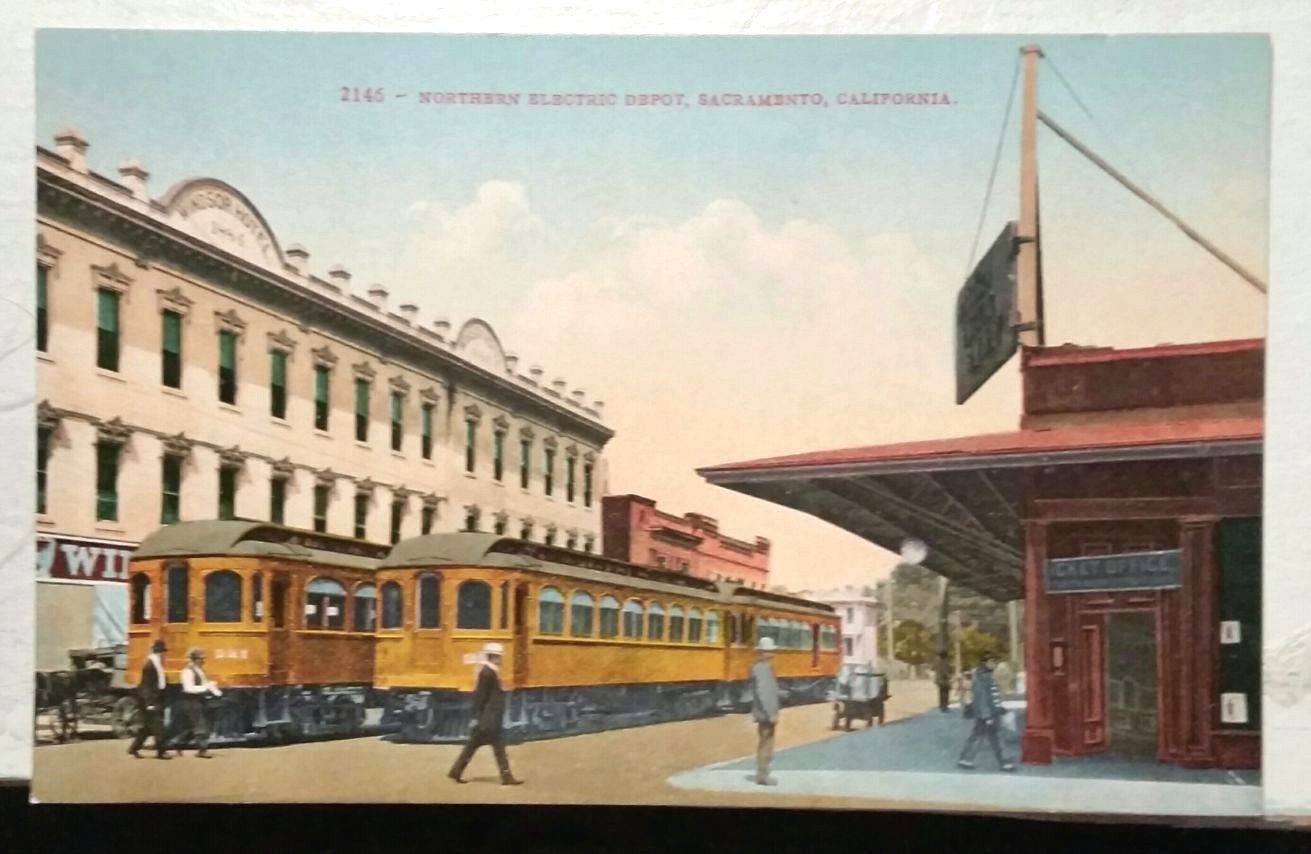
Postcard depicting the Northern Electric Railway depot in Sacramento, c. 1915

The original, 93-mile (150 km) route connected Chico with Sacramento. The line began as the Chico Electric Railway (CERY), in operation beginning in 1905. The company had acquired two horse-powered street railways in Chico and Marysville, which were rebuilt for electrification. CERY was sold in 1906, after only a few months of operation, to the newly-formed Northern Electric Railway (NER). Northern Electric extended service to Oroville on April 25 of that year, continuing on through Marysville to Sacramento, beginning full service on September 1, 1907. A branch from Chico to Hamilton which crossed the Sacramento River via pontoon bridge was completed a few months later.

The company initially sought to expand. The Woodland Branch began service on July 4, 1912, with an intent to continue the line to the Bay Area. The Marysville and Colusa Branch started less than a year later, which was part of a planned expansion into the Sacramento Valley's west wide. At this time, the company additionally opened the isolated Willota–Suisun–Vacaville branch, intending it as part of the eventual route to connect at Woodland. As a stopgap, passengers in Sacramento could transfer to California Transportation Company riverboats in Sacramento to continue on to San Francisco. The NER went into bankruptcy in 1914, and was reorganized into a new corporation named the Sacramento Northern Railroad (SNRR).

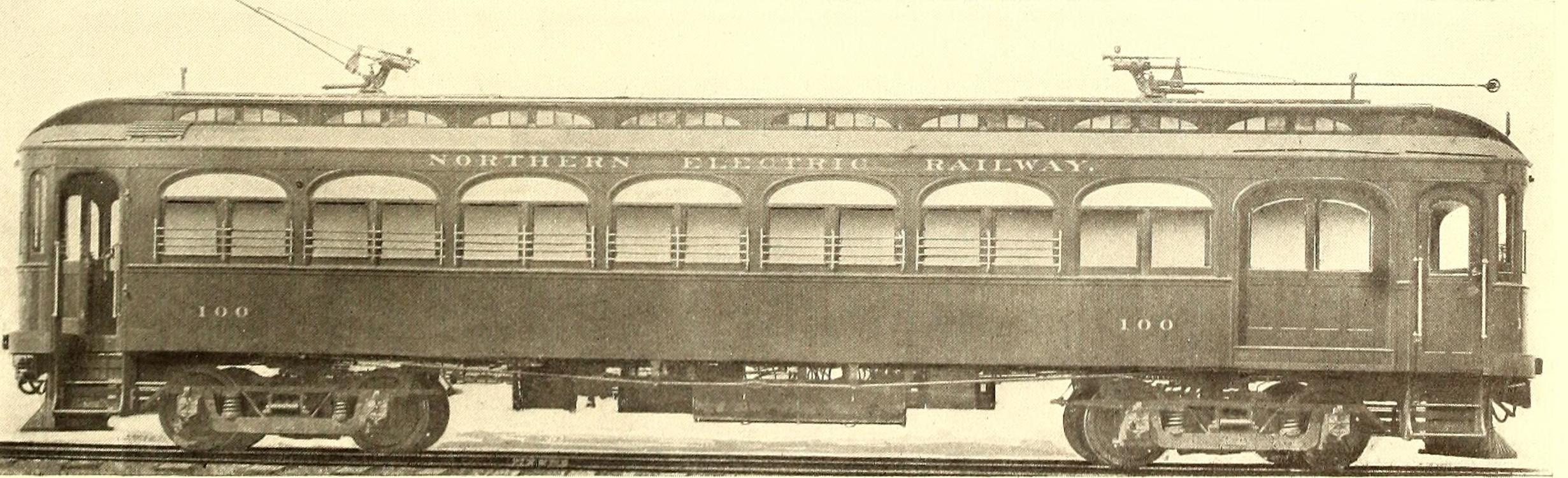
Northern Electric Railway car 100

=== Oakland, Antioch and Eastern Railway ===
The Southern Division began as the Oakland and Antioch Railway, which opened its line between Bay Point and Walnut Creek in 1910, extending to Lafayette the following year. While a bridge was planned to cross Suisun Bay, this never materialized; construction began around 1912 but ceased the following year. A wooden ferry, Bridget, was built to temporarily move trains between West Pittsburg and Chipps Island. This was done simultaneously to major expansion, with a new line run across the Sacramento Delta, trackage agreements with the Key System to their transbay ferry terminal in Oakland, and a new 3,500-foot (1,100 m) tunnel through the Oakland Hills. Regular service between Bay Point and San Francisco began on April 7, 1913. Bridget was destroyed by a fire in May 1914 — OAE rented tugs and barges until a new ferry was built. Her replacement, Ramon, was put into service by the end of the year. Full service between Oakland and Sacramento commenced on September 3, 1914. The Oakland, Antioch and Eastern Railway, as it had become known in 1912, entered receivership in 1920 and was reorganized as the San Francisco–Sacramento Railroad.

=== Consolidation ===
In 1925, the WP created a "new" Sacramento Northern Railway (SNRy), in order to group the growing collection of their interurban railroad holdings. Thus, the Sacramento Northern Railway was created from two distinct interurban railroads. Western Pacific purchased the San Francisco–Sacramento Railroad in 1922 and proceeded to acquire the stock of the NER in 1927; they consolidated operations the following year. By retaining the Sacramento Northern Railway as a subsidiary rather than just absorbing it into the Western Pacific Railroad, the WP earned more income by interchanging freight with a separate Sacramento Northern Railroad due to extra fees earned from shipper-customers by interchanging freight from one railroad (itself) to another (the Sacramento Northern). Western Pacific also owned regional sister electric railroads, the Tidewater Southern Railway (TS) (Stockton to Modesto) and the Central California Traction Company (CCT) (Stockton to downtown Sacramento). The CCT used the same downtown Sacramento terminal and ran directly on Sacramento streets.

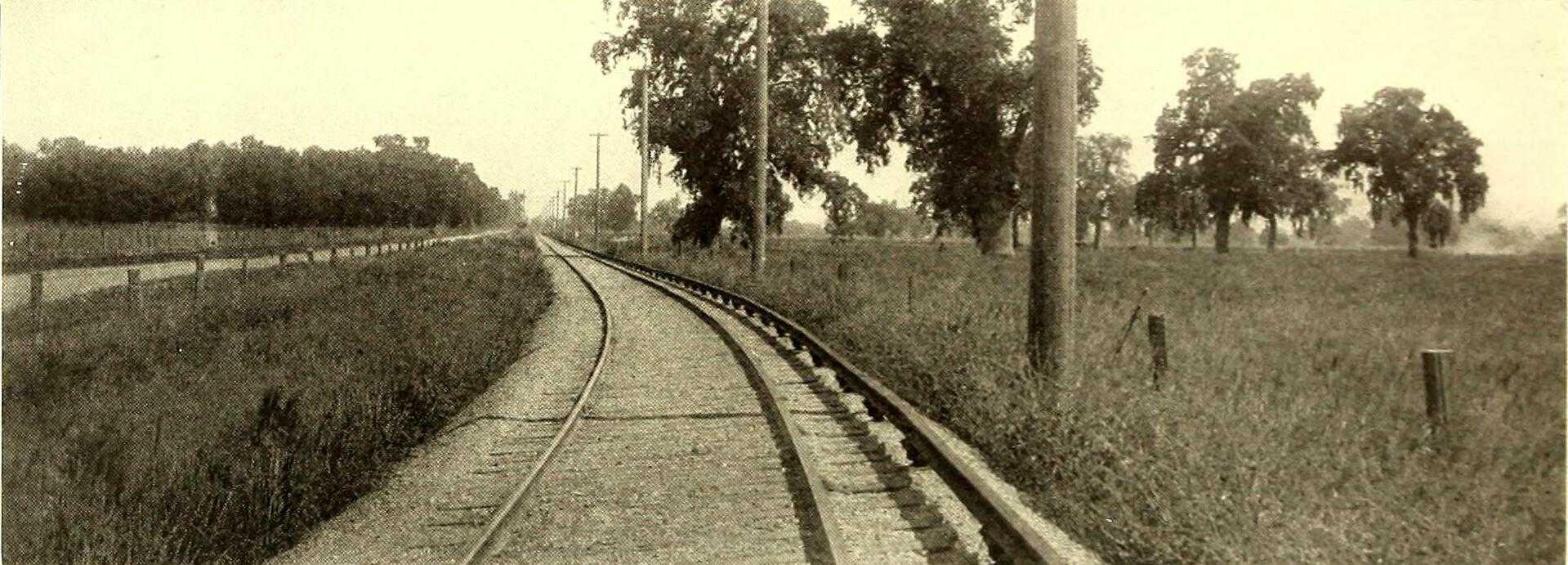
Northern Electric Railway right of way with third rail power, 1909

The two divisions used different voltages as well as different methods of current collection, thus only some powered equipment could traverse the entire Chico to Oakland route. When in Oakland, SN used Key System electric power. Some equipment carried a third rail shoe, a trolley pole, and a pantograph. The differing electrical systems, third rail for the North End and trolley wire for the South End, were retained. Cars from the higher-voltage southern division could operate over the whole line, but those in the northern division were relegated to that territory.

Sacramento Northern also continued to operate streetcar services in many of its host cities. A line in Sacramento to Swanston ran between 1914 and 1932, largely subsidized by a local developer.

The combined main line extended for 183 miles (295 km) between San Francisco and Chico. At the southern end the SNRy shared track, electric propulsion power, and facilities of the East Bay's expansive Key System commuter lines. At first this used the Key System Mole in West Oakland. Then, beginning in 1939, trains began running on the tracked lower deck of the San Francisco–Oakland Bay Bridge into the Transbay Terminal in San Francisco.

==== Scheduled service ====
At 183 miles (295 km), the railroad's Comet and Meteor services between San Francisco and Chico were the longest interurban lines in North America. It was built and operated to first-class railroad standards, such as providing dining and parlor car service and operated at speeds up to 60 miles per hour (97 km/h). Rail service to Oroville ended in 1938 after the bridge into the town center washed out. In June 1939 the mainline runs were cut back to three weekday trains from Chico to San Francisco, one from Sacramento to San Francisco, and three from Concord to San Francisco. The fastest train was scheduled at 5 hours 43 minutes from Chico to San Francisco, and 2 hours 48 minutes Sacramento to San Francisco.

==== Financial issues ====
As with most interurban railroads in the US, the SN's return on initial investment was lower and its annual operating costs were higher than had been projected at conception. Interurbans, like most railroads, were very labor-intensive, particularly with the labor costs of maintaining motorized rolling stock and repairing electrical systems. Passenger business was less than initially projected and became increasingly unprofitable, even after SN reached downtown San Francisco via the new San Francisco–Oakland Bay Bridge in 1939. Passenger service south from Sacramento to Pittsburg ended in August 1940, and Chico runs ceased at the end of October. In January 1941, SN operated two weekday trains from Pittsburg to San Francisco and two Concord trains. Interurban passenger service totally ended on July 1, 1941. Afterwards, SN transitioned to become a shortline freight-hauling railroad. Its freight business and its relationship with the adjacent Western Pacific Railroad was the lifeblood of the railroad, keeping it in profit long after passenger service had ceased. Although it had a somewhat shorter route from Oakland to Pittsburg/Antioch in competing with the Santa Fe and Southern Pacific steam railroads, its route through the Oakland hills was steep (4%) and curvy by railroad standards plus it had on-street operation in Oakland. Freight trains usually had just a few cars on those grades with locomotives ("juice jacks") at both ends of the train. From Sacramento north to Chico, the SN competed with the Southern Pacific Railroad and, up to 1922, with the Western Pacific from Marysville south. It traversed a low density population rural farm country from Chico which contained only Marysville and Yuba City as major towns before reaching Sacramento. Thus, passenger business north of Sacramento was light and could not be expected to increase. The SN had branches to Vacaville and Dixon, Woodland, Colusa, and Oroville.

==== Business decline ====
The railway suffered from statewide business decline due to the Great Depression plus the increasing automobile use on improved roads. Interurban service ended in 1941. Streetcar service in Chico continued as a condition of letting the railroad operate freight trains on city streets. Freight service continued and was heavy during World War II. The city of Chico paid for an extension to the Chico Municipal Airport as a new Army Air Corps training base was installed there, though this line was only used for freight. After the war, streetcar service had precariously fallen off, and the company was allowed to discontinue its passenger operations in Chico after December 15, 1947.

The 1951 Lisbon Trestle Collapse, in which crewmen were injured but no lives were lost, required a costly rebuild of the long causeway trestle north of the Suisun Bay. The aging train ferry, Ramon, was removed from service in 1954 after failing a Coast Guard inspection. As a result, most traffic ceased on the main line south of Sacramento. Western Pacific arranged for trackage rights to close the gaps between Sacramento and Pittsburg. In 1956 SN reported 45 million ton-miles (65.7 million tonne-km) of revenue freight; at the end of the year it operated 349 miles (562 km) of road and 452 miles (727 km) of track. Operating revenue that year was $2.2 million (equivalent to $26.1 million in 2025), but in that year ICC included SN among the Class Is.

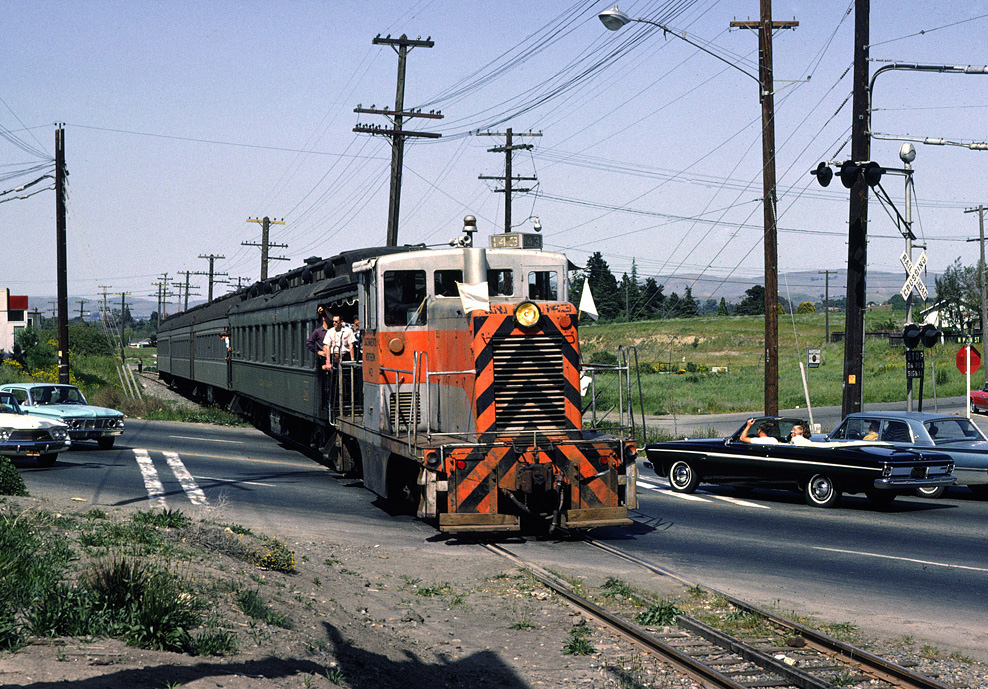
SN 143 leads an excursion train, April 1964

==== Reducing electrification ====
The SN received its first diesel locomotives in 1941 and this began its process of de-electrification. All electric operation ceased in 1965 at Yuba City after which the railway operated as a dieselized freight subsidiary of the Western Pacific. Trackage was abandoned over the years, especially that which duplicated routes on other railroads. The SN name ceased to exist with the WP's acquisition by the Union Pacific in 1983.

==== Present day segments ====
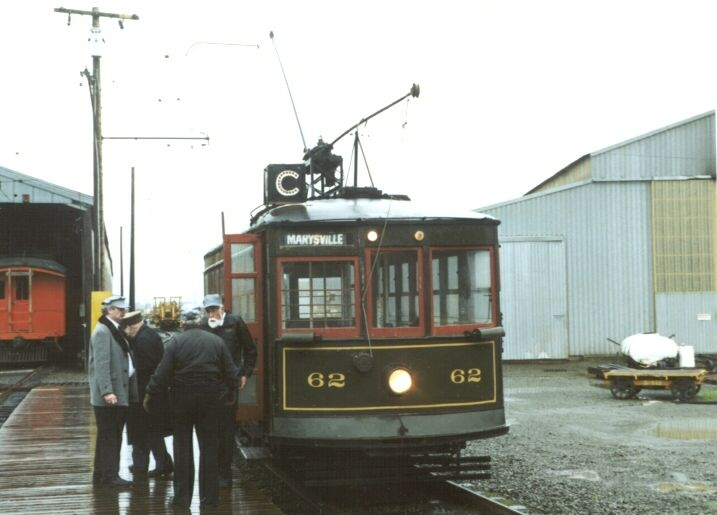
Sacramento Northern Birney car 62 at the Western Railway Museum, Rio Vista, California

A 22-mile (35 km) segment of the SN line in Solano County is owned, operated, and electrified by the Western Railway Museum as a heritage railway. Much of the SN's former equipment is part of the museum's permanent collection.

Segments of the Woodland Branch continue to see limited freight service as well as excursion trips and railbike hires operated as the RiverFox Train. Some of the right of way in Concord and Walnut Creek were reactivated in the 1970s for use by Bay Area Rapid Transit. The streetcar line north of Sacramento to Swanston was also reactivated for the SacRT light rail service in the 1980s.

Segments of the right of way in Butte County, Contra Costa County (the Lafayette-Moraga Regional Trail), Solano County, and Sacramento County have been converted to rail trails.

== Route ==
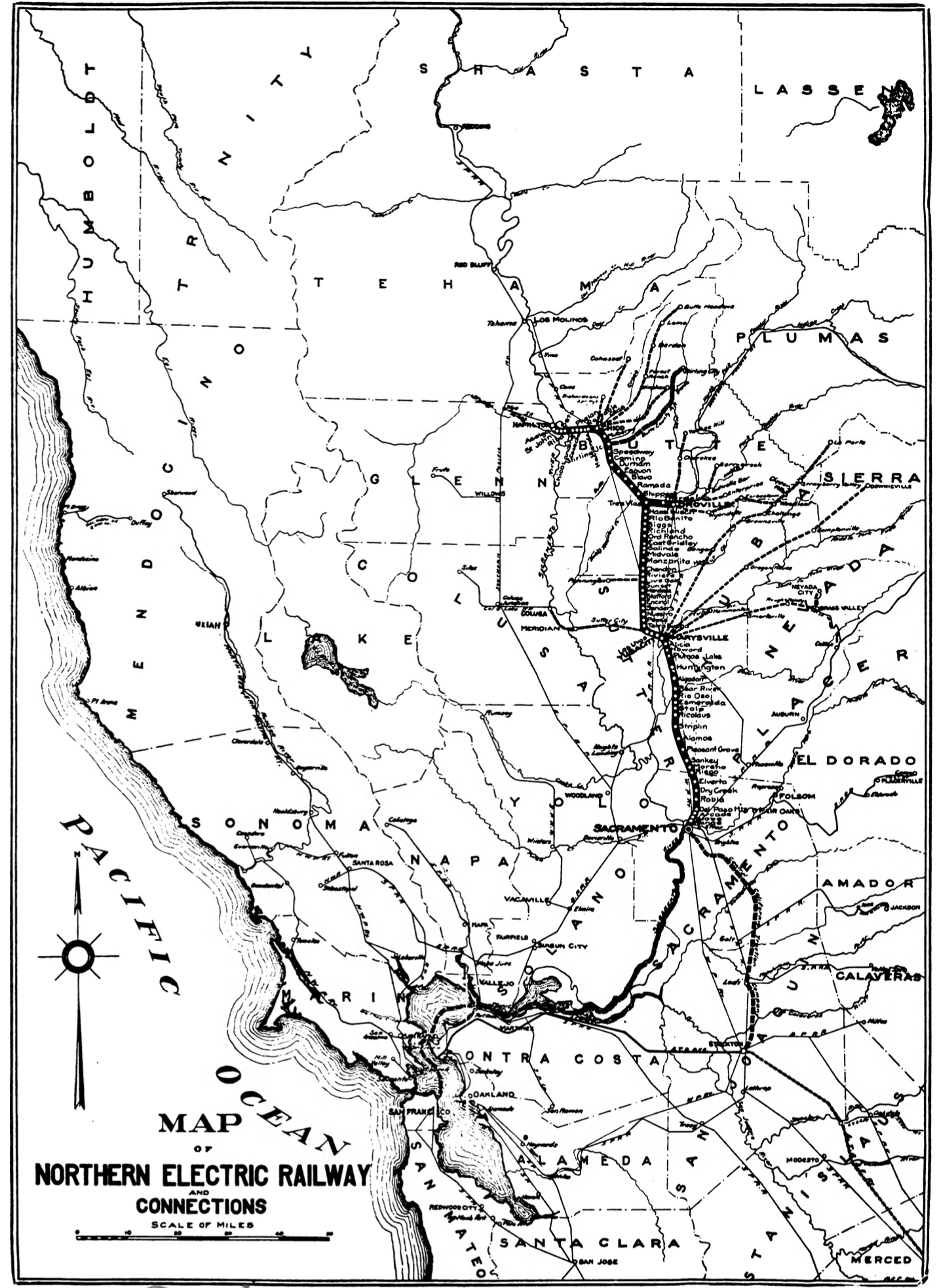
Map of Northern Electric Railway Connections c. 1912

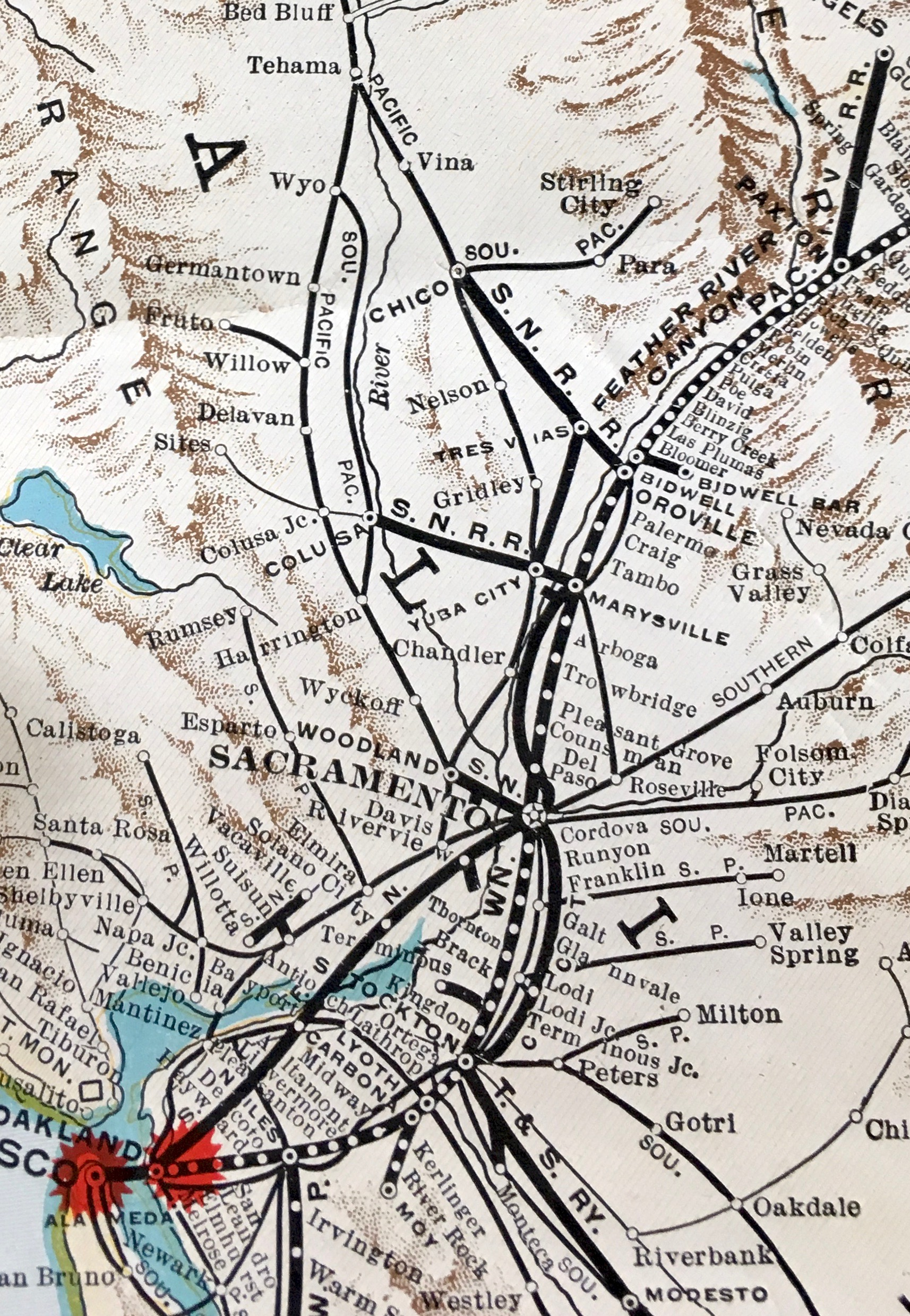
Sacramento Northern Railway in 1931

=== Oakland to Sacramento ===
In June 1911, SN's predecessor, the Oakland and Antioch, purchased a parcel of land from the Realty Syndicate (associated with the Key System) for its planned terminal yard at 40th Street and Shafter Avenue in Oakland. Construction of the facility began immediately in conjunction with the laying of tracks from the site northward along Shafter Avenue toward the hills.

Although the compact yard at 40th and Shafter was the end of its right-of-way, SN trains continued west along 40th Street on the tracks of the Key System and on to the Key System's "mole". In later years, the trains ran over the San Francisco–Oakland Bay Bridge which was built near the site of the Key mole, to San Francisco's downtown Transbay Terminal, connecting by way of the Key's tracks on Yerba Buena Avenue and 40th Street. This service ended with the railroad's passenger service in 1941, but freight interchange with the Key System continued until that system's demise.

The main line ran on single track north up the center of Shafter Avenue in a residential area, passing Emerson Elementary School at 49th Street. At the end of Shafter, the track crossed College Avenue next to Claremont Junior High School and started a long curving 4% grade into the Oakland hills in the Rockridge district of Oakland. It then crossed the Temescal Canyon inlet of Lake Temescal via a bridge. During the preparations for the Broadway (Caldecott) Tunnel project, this inlet was filled in and the Sacramento Northern tracks re-routed along the top of a new high embankment above the lake, buttressed by a massive retaining wall that still exists today.

From Lake Temescal, the tracks ran southeast through the Montclair district of Oakland. It crossed into Montclair over a trestle at Moraga Avenue and Thornhill Drive, then ran along a high berm between Montclair Recreation Center and Montclair Elementary School, before crossing Mountain Blvd and Snake Road via trestle. High above the northwest side of Shepherd Canyon, the line headed east, then made a sharp turn northeast as it passed through a major cut in the hill. It then climbed up Shepherd Canyon to a station called "Havens" at Paso Robles Drive, named for real estate developer Frank C. Havens, one-time partner of the Key System's "Borax" Smith who was trying to encourage sales in Shepherd Canyon.

At Havens, below Saroni Drive, the line entered a short ravine leading to the entrance of a one mile long single-track tunnel under the Oakland Hills. The tunnel itself is still intact but is sealed at both ends. In 1994, home developers filled in the approach ravine and tunnel mouth and constructed residential homes on this fill and on top of the tunnel. The upper foot of the top of the tunnel portal could be observed in the back yard of one of the new homes. A home further northeast behind the first was constructed on top of the unlined tunnel, and by altering drainage in the area caused the tunnel below the home to slowly subside. The home shifted and dropped and had to be removed.

The SN track exited the tunnel into Contra Costa County at Pinehurst Road near Huckleberry Botanic Regional Preserve, and immediately curved over a bridge over Pinehurst Road to run southeastward through Redwood Canyon. The railroad designated a station just outside the tunnel portal as "Eastport." The tunnel portal is no longer visible, largely as a result of a landslide which occurred during the El Niño rains of the early 1980s.

The right of way ran along an extant fire trail near the spot where Pinehurst Road makes a sharp u-turn. This fire trail was previously known as Winding Way on some maps, and was originally an old 19th century logging road built by Hiram Thorn, for bringing redwood logs out of the Moraga Redwoods and to his mill, and then over the mountain into Oakland. Even earlier, the route up the canyon to what is now Huckleberry preserve was a cattle trail for the Spanish and Mexican ranchers, en route to a landing at the mouth of Temescal Creek on San Francisco Bay.

At the sharp curve at Eastport, the tracks immediately crossed over Pinehurst road on a bridge. The right-of-way then headed down Redwood Canyon on a ledge (still apparent today) just above Pinehurst Road, progressing southeast past the small community of Canyon. The line then turned north to Moraga, past St Mary's, and thence northeasterly through Lafayette, Saranap, and the valley past Walnut Creek and to Concord and Pittsburg. Some of the right of way through Contra Costa County is now used by the BART system to Concord.

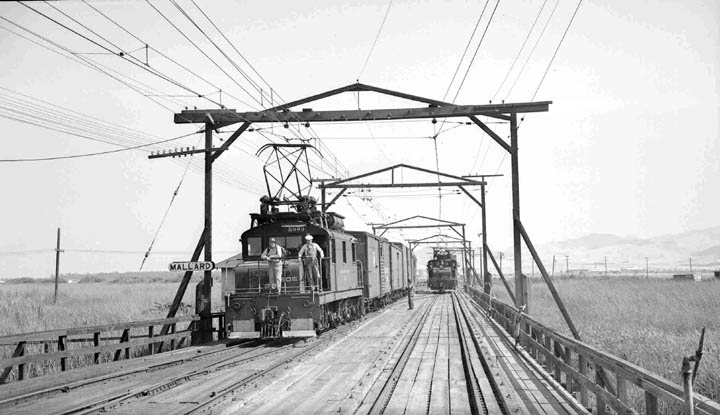
Tracks at Mallard, c. 1948

At Pittsburg, the tracks ran parallel, adjacent, and south of the Santa Fe and the Southern Pacific main lines, then dropped down, turned north sharply and went under the SF and SP through an underpass to almost immediately reach the SN ferry landing on Suisun Bay. (This track layout and underpass are still shown on a 2009 Google website map of Pittsburg.) The Pittsburg side ferry landing and depot was called "Mallard" by the SN. There a ferry boat (the Ramon) carried an entire passenger train across to a north side landing near Suisun called "Chipps" on Chipps Island.

From here the line proceeded north across an extensive marshland (including Chipps Island and Van Sickle Island) on a long trestle. After the trestle, the tracks continued north through farmland past Montezuma, Rio Vista Junction, and Creed, where there was a branch west to Vacaville and Travis Air Force Base. (The Western Railway Museum is on this right of way). In 1913 a spur was built that connected Rio Vista Junction to the town of Dixon to the north, but it was unprofitable and was abandoned after a year or two.

Past Creed, the line continued to Dozier and Yolano before crossing the four-mile-long Lisbon trestle into West Sacramento. This trestle collapsed in July 1951 as a steeple cab-powered freight train of steel plate for Pittsburg was crossing it. At West Sacramento, just west of the Tower Bridge, the line to Woodland left the southbound main line and headed west.

Past West Sacramento, the line entered the city of Sacramento by way of the "M" Street Bridge (1911), and later by way of its replacement (1935), the Tower Bridge, which is still in use. The SN progressed through downtown streets onto I Street to reach the substantial columned two-story brick and stone Union Traction Depot ("Union Terminal") on I Street between 11th and 12th. Union Terminal, also used by Central California Traction trains to Stockton in the early years, is now gone after use in the 1950s–1960s as a grocery store. Downtown Sacramento streets, particularly east and south of the Tower Bridge, carried many SN and Central California Traction tracks.

==== Line section abandonments ====
Freight service from Oakland to Lafayette ceased on March 1, 1957. Overhead wire and tracks were removed and the Shepherd Canyon tunnel sealed. The former roadbed from St Mary's College through Lafayette was converted to the popular Lafayette–Moraga Regional Trail. The following year, freight service only extended from Walnut Creek to Sacramento.

The ferry Ramon was removed from service in 1954, so SN, through parent Western Pacific, had to obtain trackage rights on the Santa Fe from Stockton to Pittsburg where SN trains could reach SN tracks and freight shippers in Pittsburg and Concord. When the Union Pacific absorbed Western Pacific/SN it obtained further trackage rights on the Santa Fe which extended to Port Chicago where SN had a small yard. Thus, Pittsburg trackage was removed in the early 1990s.

=== Sacramento to Chico ===
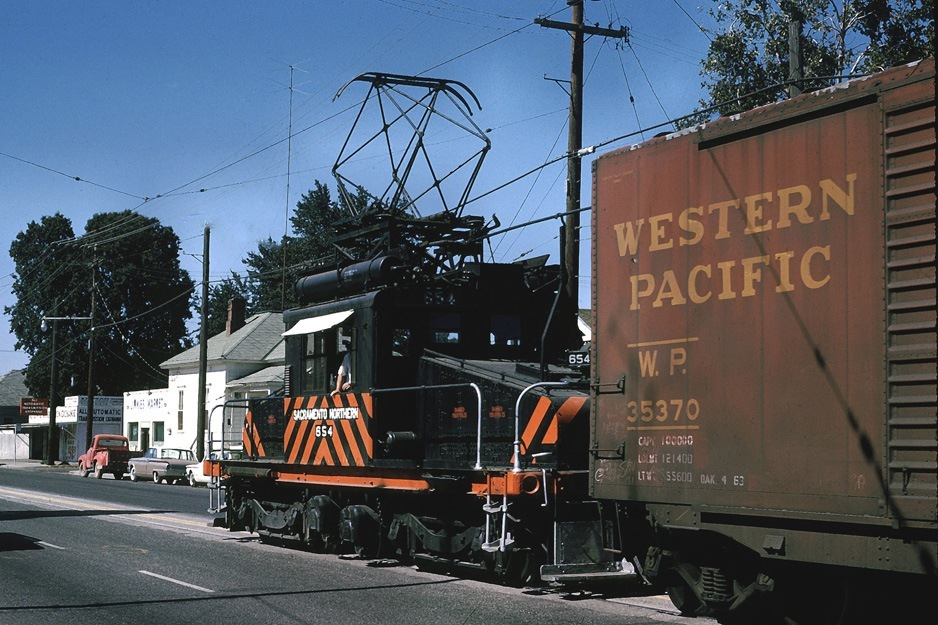
Sacramento Northern electric locomotive #654 hauling a train on Bridge Street in Yuba City

From the Sacramento depot at present day Terminal Way, the SN's "North End" ran to a Northern Electric-built truss bridge crossing the American River and then on to Rio Linda, to East Nicolaus, then to Marysville where it crossed the Feather River into adjacent Yuba City, split off the branch to Colusa, then went on to Live Oak, split off the branch to Oroville, then to Gridley and to Chico where it terminated. In Chico there were yards and primary shops.

=== Woodland Branch ===
The electrified Woodland branch line left the Oakland bound main line at West Sacramento and ran 16 miles (26 km) straight west toward Woodland (known as the Yolo Shortline RR until 2003 and now known as the Sierra Northern Railway). The track proceeds across a very long elevated wood viaduct-bridge over the wide Yolo flood plain to enter Woodland and go down Main Street to the Woodland Opera House where the interurban cars turned around. Today SERA terminates shortly before East Street several blocks east of the Opera House. The Woodland terminal was a unique Mission-style structure and was recently reconstructed. The Sacramento bound interurban cars exited the terminal onto Main Street through a unique archway in the station wall. An additional branch operated on Second Street via tracks owned by the Sacramento and Woodland Railroad.

=== In Sacramento ===
The SN entered Sacramento from the north crossing the American River on a through truss bridge. It then proceeded on private right of way between 18th and 19th streets to D street where it turned west in the middle of D to 15th Street then south on 15th to I street where it turned west on I to the city's interurban Union Terminal and interurban car storage yard bounded by H, I, 11th and 12th streets. Trains turned into the terminal leaving the street. It then proceeded west on I to 8th, then turned south to M Street, then west on M over the Sacramento River to West Sacramento. From there it turned south on a direct line to Rio Vista and the delta river crossing on the SN ferry at Chipps.

=== Marysville and Colusa Branch ===
The branch to Colusa was built by a nominally independent company and leased by the Sacramento Northern. Passenger services operated between 1913 and 1940. From Colusa Junction, east of Yuba City, the line runs almost directly west through Tarke and Meridian, alongside and north of the Colusa Highway, California State Route 20. It crossed the Sacramento River on a narrow combined rail and vehicle bridge before turning northwest and running to Market Street in Colusa. In 1992 this track and unusual Meridian bridge were still in use and provided the SN with a Southern Pacific-Union Pacific interchange at Colusa.

=== Danville Branch ===
This line branched from the southern division south of Walnut Creek at Saranap, running south and paralleling the Southern Pacific's San Ramon Branch Line. It opened to Danville on March 2, 1914, extending to Diablo Park a few months later in June. Service was provided by a single car, numbered 1051. The route proved unprofitable and service ended in 1924.

=== Vaca Valley Line ===
Northern Electric acquired the failed Vallejo and Northern Railroad in 1909 and proceeded to construct a route between Vacaville and Willota with a branch to Fairfield and Suisun. Passenger service ran between the line's opening in 1914 and 1926. Like other lines built by the Northern Electric, electricity was provided via third rail. Initially isolated from the rest of the system, a new connection was built from the main line at Creed to Vacaville Junction in 1930. That connection would be severed with the commissioning of Fairfield–Suisun Army Air Base, which was built directly on the route of the railway and adjacent lands. A new connector was built to the north, bypassing the base. These lines largely operated in their own right of way except in Fairfield.

=== Dixon Branch ===
A branch line to Dixon operated less than three years between 1914 and 1917. It was built by the Sacramento Valley Electric Railroad and operated by the Oakland, Antioch and Eastern. It ran due south from Dixon to Olcott.

=== Hamilton City Branch ===
An early branch of the Northern Electric ran between Chico and Hamilton City, primarily to move sugar beets to the sugar processing plant in the latter city. It opened to passenger service on September 13, 1907. The line crossed the Sacramento River on a pontoon bridge. Sacramento Northern would go on to acquire the Shasta Southern Railway in 1909; the company had built a short line between Hamilton City and Monroeville.

=== Freight branches ===
The railroad additionally operated two long lines exclusively for freight. One ran into the farmlands around Clarksburg and another connected the main line to the formerly isolated Vacaville line. The latter was rebuilt further north when Fairfield–Suisun Army Air Base was installed.

== Terminals and stations ==
Sacramento's first interurban terminal (for the Northern Electric Railway's line from Chico and Yuba City) was at Eighth and J Streets. Sacramento's two other interurban lines, the San Francisco–Sacramento and the Central California Traction (to Stockton) had separate terminals. Pressure from Sacramento to stop loading multiple-car interurban trains on city streets led to construction of a terminal for all three in 1925. This produced the impressive two-story columned brick Union Traction Terminal along I Street between 11th and 12th Streets, near the current SacRT light rail 12th & I station. Trains left I street to circle behind the terminal to one of four tracks for passenger loading. The station burned internally 1972 and was removed around 2000.

The SN mission style terminal in Woodland was unusual in that the interurban cars from Sacramento went through an arch in the station's wall to reach a rail yard in the rear. The terminal was adjacent to the Woodland Opera House.

The Oakland terminal was a very compact yard and buildings at 40th and Shafter with a wye connecting to the Key System tracks along 40th. While trains utilized Key System trackage for the final few miles of passenger service in Oakland, SN bypassed all intermediate stops and ran direct to the San Francisco terminal. Initially, trains terminated at the Key System Mole, where passengers could transfer to ferries to San Francisco. Trains to the San Francisco Transbay Terminal lasted over two years at the end of interurban service.

== Technical information ==
=== Electrification ===
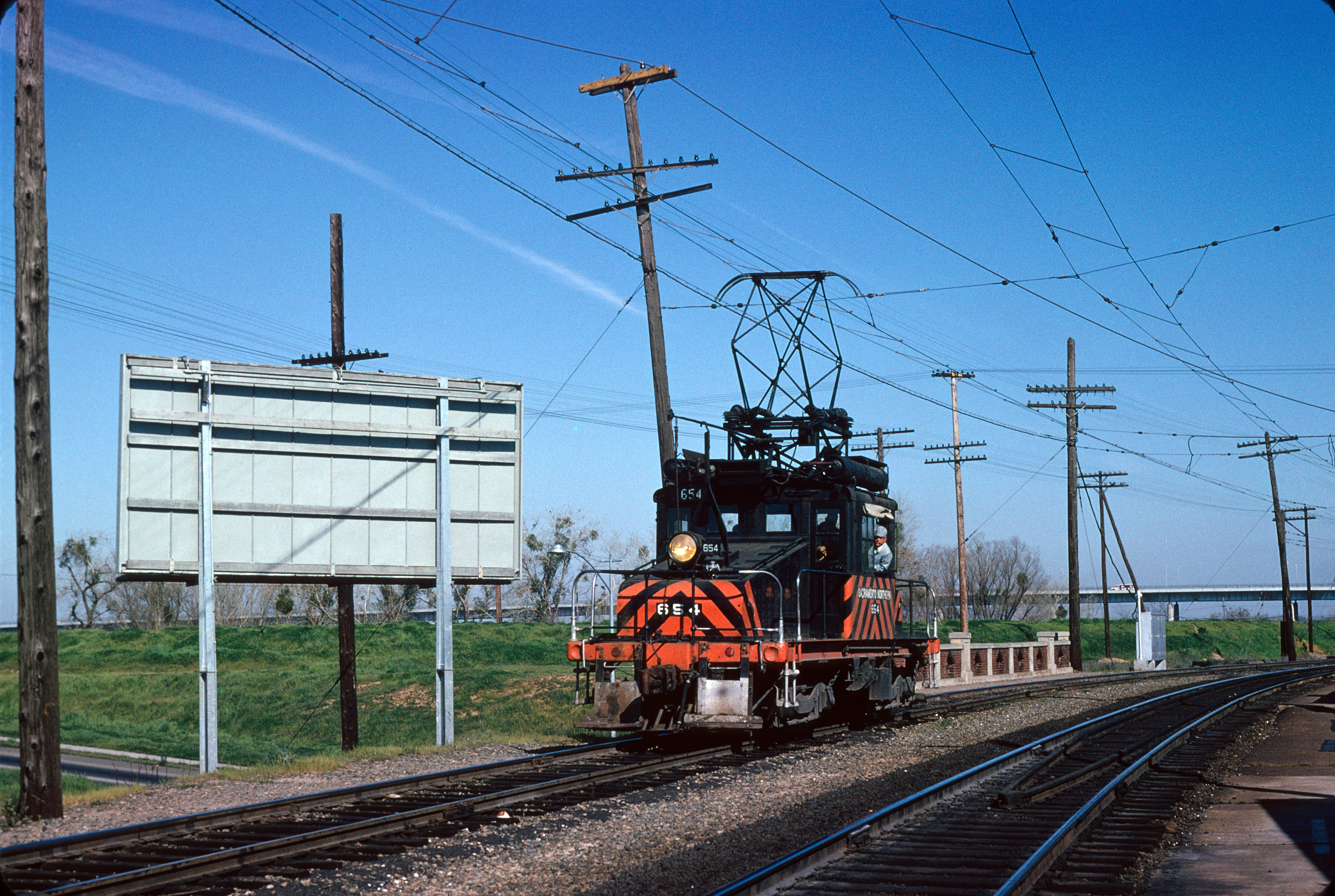
SN 654 on an electrified segment of the Western Pacific main line at Marysville in March 1965

Because of its history as separate railways as well as the interconnection with the Key System, SN cars had to operate under a number of different electrical standards. The North End was electrified at 600 volts DC, the nationwide standard trolley and interurban voltage at the time of construction. Trolley wire and trolley poles were used only in urban areas. In the open country, the line used a solid, uncovered top-contact third rail. Cars built originally for the North End could not operate south of Sacramento. The South End (former OA&E, Oakland, Antioch, and Eastern) was electrified largely at 1,200 volts DC until 1936, after which it operated at 1,500 volts, with areas of 600 volts in Oakland and Sacramento.

The interurban cars had to use a pantograph rather than the trolley pole on Key System rails (electrified at 600 volts) and over the Bay Bridge (electrified at 1,200 volts for the Southern Pacific); the Key System used a covered top-contact third rail over the bridge. Because of the Key System's third rail, cars that could traverse the whole system had to have their third rail shoes removed, since the top-contact shoes would have fouled the Key System rail's cover. They were normally added or removed in Sacramento. Such all-line capable cars were switchable between 600 V and 1,200 V operation; they could also operate at half power at the 1,200 V setting on 600 V overhead.

The SN's south end high-quality electrification used catenary rather than a single trolley wire, leading to the eventual exclusive use of pantographs rather than trolley poles south of Sacramento. Catenary allows the vertical supporting poles to be spaced farther apart than if a single suspended trolley wire is used, plus it is better for pantograph operation at speed due to stability (The South Shore line uses pantographs with a single trolley wire in Michigan City streets but has catenary for high speed operation elsewhere).

=== Cars and trains ===
Sacramento Northern offered dining service aboard parlor-observation cars Bidwell, Sacramento, Moraga and Alabama. The Alabama had been built in 1905 as the private car of Pacific Electric Railway owner Henry E. Huntington and was purchased by the SN. This car operated on the Sacramento Northern from 1921 until destroyed in 1931 by a fire caused by a short circuit in its coffeemaker. Sacramento Northern name trains operating between Oakland, Sacramento and Chico included the Comet, Meteor, Sacramento Valley Limited and Steamer Special

=== Suisun Bay crossing and ferry ===
==== Planned bridge ====
The Oakland, Antioch and Eastern needed to cross Suisun Bay, and chose to do so between West Pittsburg and Chipps Island, a gap of 2,600 feet (790 m). The bay saw heavy shipping traffic and thus a high-level drawbridge with long approaches was required. Construction began in 1912; the estimated price tag was $1.5 million ($50 million in 2025 adjusted for inflation) and construction time was estimated as two and a half years. This would have delayed the opening of the railway, and so an alternative plan of a ferry service was implemented as a temporary measure. Construction of the bridge stopped in May 1913 after construction of the pier on the Contra Costa County side, because of a shortage of funds due to uncertainties brought on by World War I. The railway, not meeting revenue expectations, never did restart construction, and the "temporary" ferry service became the permanent method of traversing the waterway.

==== Car ferry service ====
The railway was one of only two interurbans to operate a car ferry, and was the longer and more ambitious of the two. The first ferry constructed, the 186-foot (57 m) Bridgit (a pun on "Bridge It") was constructed of wood in San Francisco and launched in July 1913. It was destroyed by fire on May 17, 1914.

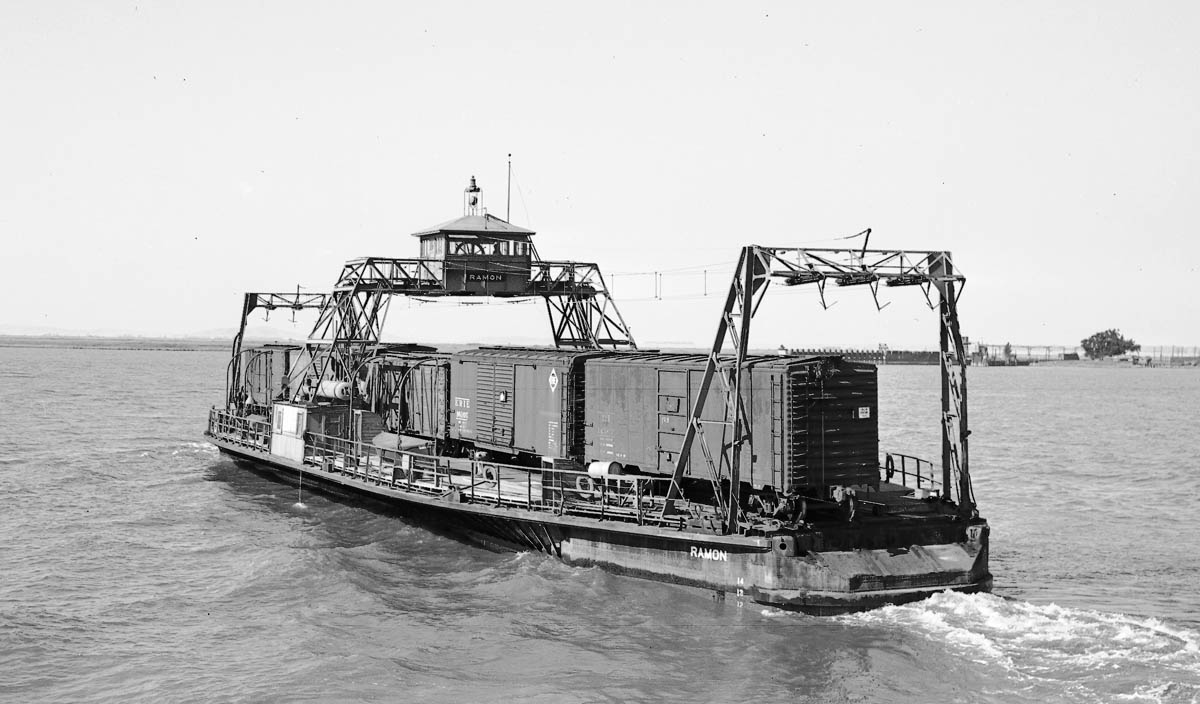
Ramon, 1947

After unsuccessful experiments with an unpowered barge, the railroad rented car floats from other railroads in the area and commissioned a new, steel ferry from the Lanteri Shipyard in nearby Pittsburg. The Ramon was constructed entirely from flat steel plate to save time, and had no curved surfaces on its hull. It was double ended with a central, raised bridge in the typical carfloat style. Power was by a 600 horsepower (450 kW) distillate engine, one of the largest constructed, which was insufficient to counteract high winds and currents in the bay.

Three tracks were installed on the deck, all long enough to carry three passenger cars or five freight cars. All three could not be used at the same time; the central track overlapped the other two, and either the single central track or the two outside tracks could be used, depending on load. All tracks were equipped with powered trolley wire.

The Ramon was retired in 1954 after a Coast Guard inspection determined that the hull plating was no longer in a safe condition, and it was scrapped locally.

=== Bridges and viaducts ===
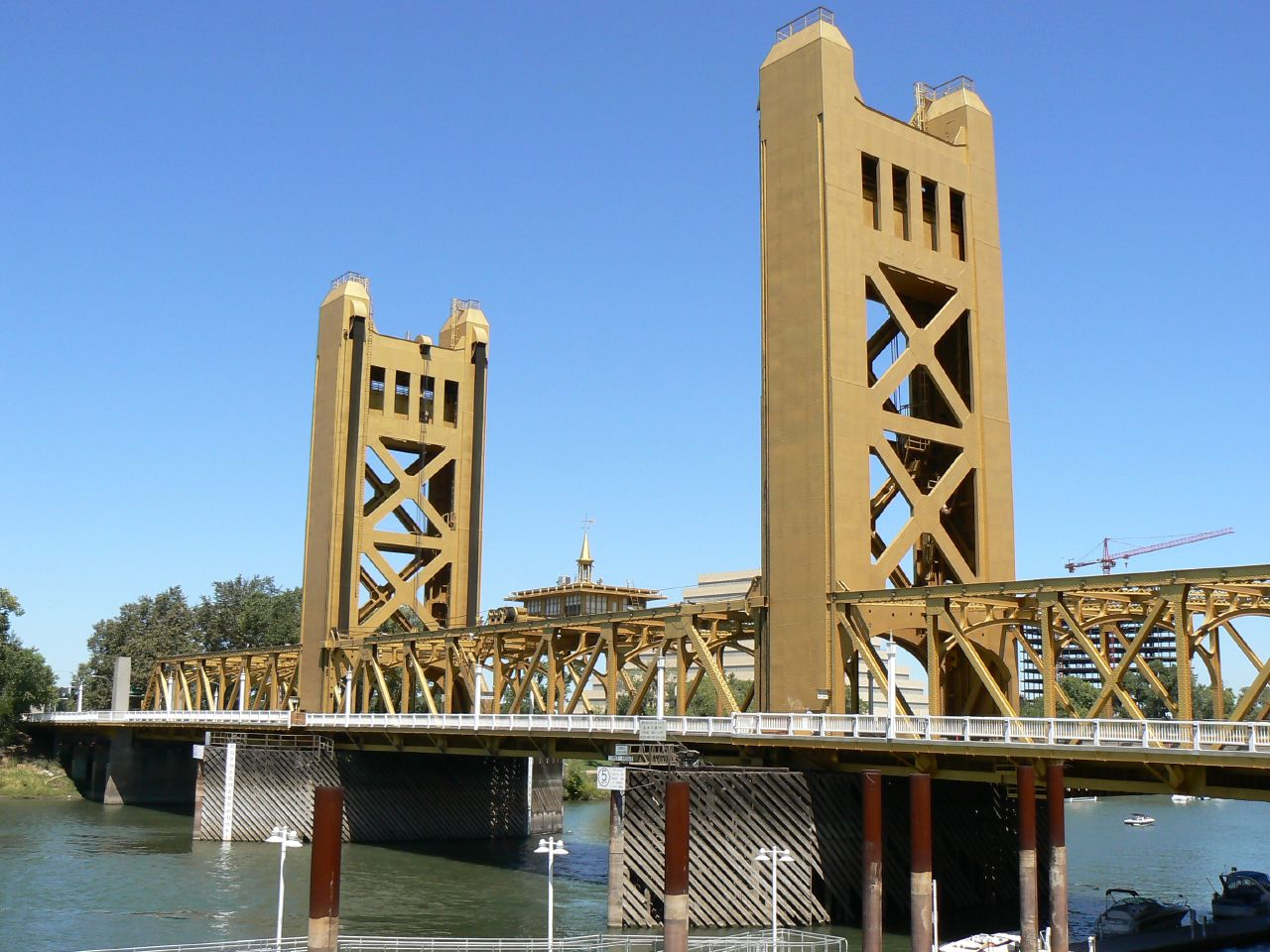
The Tower Bridge in Sacramento was built as the route of the Sacramento Northern, replacing the earlier M Street swing bridge.

The SN had two very long wood piling viaducts that crossed the Yolo flood plain. The Lisbon trestle near Rio Vista was built by the OAE as part of the main line on the north side of Suisun Bay; a 4,000-foot (1,200 m) section collapsed into the flood plain in 1951, with the replacement only in service a few years before abandonment. The Yolo causeway is an 11,000-foot (3,400 m) trestle built by the Northern Electric as part of their extension to Woodland.

The M Street Bridge between Sacramento and West Sacramento was built in 1911 by the Northern Electric. It was a center-bearing swing bridge truss bridge. By the 1930s, the bridge was experiencing increased congestion from both road and marine traffic and a replacement was planned by the State, County, and railroad. The Tower Bridge opened in 1935, replacing the span with a vertical lift bridge. It was added to the National Register of Historic Places in 1982.

California State Route 20 crossed the Sacramento River at Meridian on a bridge also carrying the Sacramento Northern's line to Colusa. The tracks were in the center of the bridge and the two highway lanes were on the sides. It was replaced in 1977.

== See also ==
- List of California street railroads
- History of rail transportation in California
