= Sacramento Union Traction Depot =

Railway station

Coordinates: 38.5815°N 121.4908°W

The Sacramento Union Traction Depot was an interurban union railway station in Sacramento, California. Its building and tracks were situated on a parcel bordered by H, I, 11th and 12th Streets. Opened in 1925, it consolidated operations of several of the area's local electric railways in one location, offering simplified interchanges for passengers. The Depot was built by the predecessors of the Sacramento Northern Railway as well as the Central California Traction Company. Passenger train services ceased 1940, but the building remained in use for freight operations dispatching. The building was largely destroyed in a fire.

The Depot opened on September 20, 1925, as the new Sacramento terminal of the Sacramento Northern and the San Francisco–San Francisco Railroad (both later amalgamated under the same corporation). Central California Traction began service here the following March, having previously terminated at the corner of 8th and L Streets. After passenger service ended, a market opened in the station building.

== Operations ==
Large terminals were rare among interurban-style transit services — Sacramento was exceptional in this regard. The station was built as a loop, allowing cars to enter from both directions on I Street and resume running in either direction as well.

SN cars arriving from Oakland and continuing north had their third rail shoes added here (as the third rail on the Bridge Railway was incompatible with the top-contact system used on the Northern district).

Preceding station	Sacramento Northern Railway	Following station
3rd Street & M Street toward Transbay Terminal	Main Line	Rio Linda toward Chico
3rd Street & M Street toward Woodland	Woodland Branch	Terminus
Preceding station	Central California Traction Company	Following station
Terminus	Main Line	Eighth and X Streets toward Stockton
