= Tidewater Southern Railway =

Overview
- Headquarters: Stockton, California
- Reporting mark: TS
- Locale: Central California
- Dates of operation: 1910–1987
- Successor: Union Pacific

Technical
- Track gauge: 4 ft 8 1/2 in (1,435 mm) standard gauge
- Electrification: Overhead line, 1,200 V DC
- Length: 85 mi (137 km)

The Tidewater Southern Railway was a short line railroad in Central California in the United States. For most of its history, it was a subsidiary of the Western Pacific Railroad. It was originally built as an interurban system, connecting to the Central California Traction Company, Western Pacific Railroad, Southern Pacific Railroad and Atchison, Topeka and Santa Fe Railway in Stockton, California. Its mainline went southeast from Stockton to Escalon, California and thence to Modesto, California before splitting into two branches ending at the towns of Turlock and Hilmar. Until the mid-1930s, there were plans to extend the line to Fresno and even toward the Los Angeles area. Today, much of the line is still operated by the Union Pacific Railroad. Of all the former interurban railroads in California, the former Tidewater Southern retains the highest percentage of still operating trackage.

== History ==
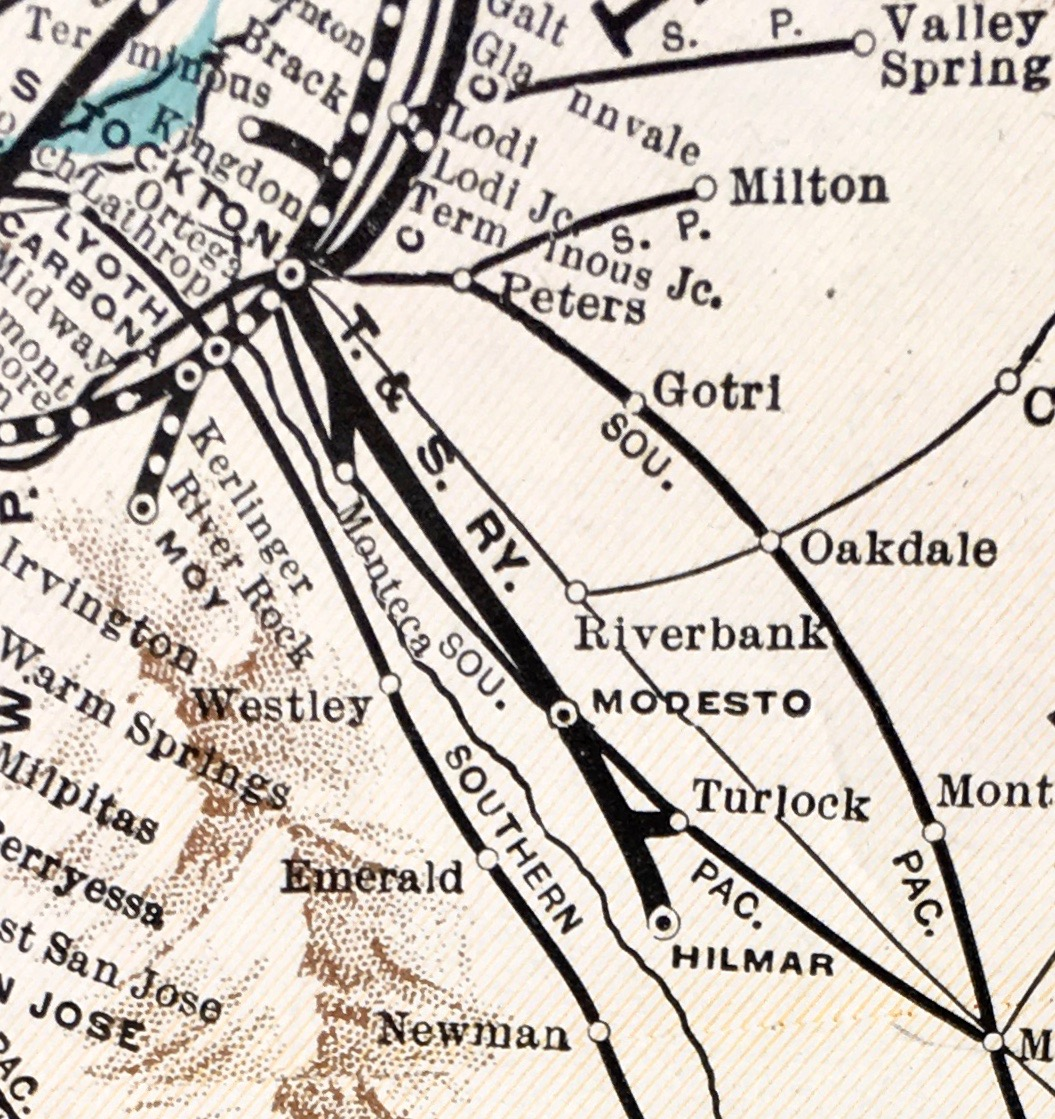
T&S RY route in 1931

The railway was incorporated in 1910; construction from Stockton began in 1911 and service to Modesto began in 1912 with steam locomotive-hauled passenger service. Electrification, using a 1,200 VDC overhead system, was completed in 1913, and regular electric car service began on a 2-hour schedule. In addition to passenger service, the railway operated extensive freight service in the area.

In 1916, the railway was extended to Turlock, California, and in 1917 to Hilmar, California. The lines to Turlock and Hilmar split at a junction known as Hatch, California. This portion was never electrified and never operated passenger service, being purely for freight. Also in 1917, a new mainline was built into Stockton; the previous line ran to the east of the WP and SP lines and partially used Central California Traction Company trackage. A freight-only branch to Manteca, California was constructed in 1918. While many references list this branch as being unelectrified, evidence from the TS mechanical department and the Western Pacific's accounting files show that the line did in fact have overhead wire and was operating with electric locomotives.

Most of the stock of the railway was purchased by the Western Pacific Railroad in 1917, but the WP began influencing TS actions as early as 1913. The railroad was operated as a subsidiary thereafter.

Passenger service was abandoned in 1932 and the railway operated solely as a freight line, with the exception of offering passenger carriage in the line's cabooses. This situation lasted until the 1960s, with the parent company reportedly having forgotten to formally abandon the passenger tariff. The electrification was dismantled after this point except in Modesto, where a city ordinance prohibited the operation of steam locomotives. The railway therefore retained 2.1 miles (3.4 km) of electrification within Modesto, and the railway's two steeplecab electric locomotives. Outside Modesto, all freight traffic was now steam hauled. Additional steam locomotives were borrowed from the Western Pacific when needed. In 1940, a former Sierra Railroad steam engine was acquired.

Busy traffic during World War II increased the Tidewater Southern's traffic hugely, and locomotives were borrowed from other roads to handle it, including two Sacramento Northern Railway box motors, several steam locomotives and a number of WP diesel locomotives, the first on the system.

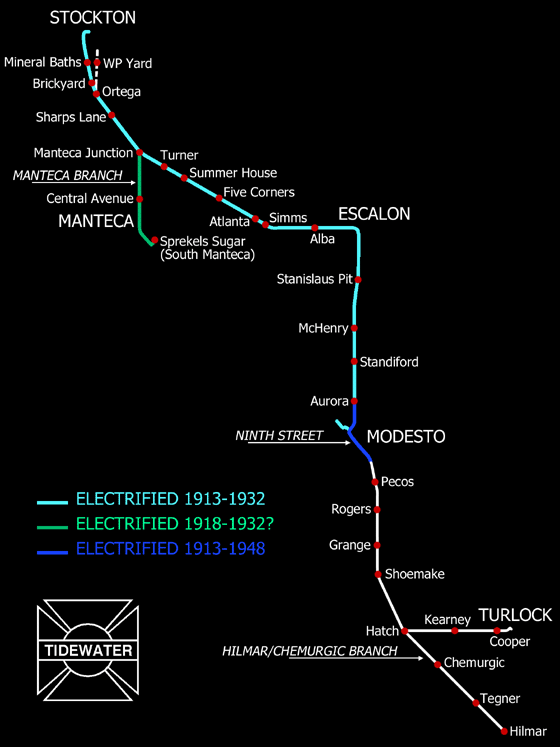
Map of the Tidewater Southern Railway, showing electrified sections

After the war, the acquisition of more diesel locomotives led to the rapid retirement of the railway's electric locomotives and one of the steam locomotives, although steam traction was retained until several bridges were upgraded in the late 1950s to bear the weight of diesel locomotives. TS steamer 132 was the last in operation, probably performing the last revenue steam work on the Western Pacific system in October 1953. Starting in the mid-1950s, the line also added a small fleet of modern freight cars, some of which survived until the early 1980s.

From the late 1960s, the system's independence began to decline as it became increasingly operated by Western Pacific locomotives and crews, until it became a "paper railroad", nominally a separate corporation but invisibly so in actual operation. Its traffic, however, continued to expand. The construction of several grain silos near Turlock, used to supply animal feed, eventually required long unit trains to bring in the volume of Midwestern grain required to fill them. By the late 1970s, these trains were the main traffic on the line and led to much anger from the city of Modesto, where the mainline occupied the middle of Ninth Street, the major north-south roadway. The last locomotives and cabooses lettered for the TS were retired in late 1976.

While the WP purchased most of the road's stock in 1917, it did not acquire complete control until some time in the 1960s. A small amount of the common stock (around 4%) was owned by private individuals and the road sent letters to them annually reporting on the company's state and finances. The end for the Tidewater Southern as a company came in 1983 when the Union Pacific absorbed the railway's parent Western Pacific Railroad. Final merger into the UP occurred in 1986, when the TS corporate structure was abolished.

Since 1983, the remaining portions of the Tidewater Southern have been the Tidewater Subdivision of the Union Pacific. In 2001, the line on Modesto's Ninth Street was abandoned, severing the railroad in the middle. The Turlock-bound grain trains now bypass the north end of the railroad and enter former TS rails just south of Modesto. The north end is still served by one train 3-4 times a week. The branch to Manteca was abandoned in the early 1990s.

== Equipment ==
The Tidewater Southern only ever owned three interurban electric passenger cars; all were built by the Jewett Car Company in 1912 and bought new. This roster was unusual in that all were combine cars, each having a freight section. The Tidewater was one of the few interurbans to never roster a "pure" electric passenger car. When extra capacity was needed, passenger trailers were borrowed from the Central California Traction Company.

It also owned two steeplecab electric freight locomotives: one was a stock General Electric model, while the other was built by the Central California Traction Company from an old flatcar.

Old newspaper reports and company records indicate that Jewett also built an express motor, but no photos of it have come to light publicly.

The road rostered three steam locomotives, with one only being used in the earliest days of the line.

Small General Electric diesel switchers replaced the steam and electric locomotives. These were later displaced by larger locomotive made by the American Locomotive Company. Western Pacific locomotives took over all operations by the mid-1970s.

== Locomotive roster ==
Builder	Type	Locomotive Numbers	Built	Years of service	Notes
Central Pacific Railroad	2-6-2T	1 (first 1)	1882	1912–1917	Used in construction and earliest operations.
Rome Locomotive Works	4-6-0	1 (second 1)	1891	1918–1946	Former Denver and Rio Grande Railroad, former Western Pacific.
Baldwin Locomotive Works	2-6-2	132 (renumbered from 32)	1923	1940–1953	Last revenue steam locomotive on Western Pacific system.
Central Cal Traction	steeplecab electric	100	1912	1914–1948	Built from a flatcar.
General Electric	steeplecab electric	106	1921	1921–1948	Sold to Sacramento Northern Railway, retired and scrapped 1957.
General Electric	44 ton	135 (renumbered 735)	1946	1946–1967	Donated to Feather River Rail Society by A&K Railroad Materials in 2008.
General Electric	70 ton	141 (renumbered 741)	1948	1948–1964	
General Electric	70 ton	142 (renumbered 742)	1948	1948–1967	
General Electric	70 ton	743	1953	1953–1968	Currently owned by Dakota Southern Railway.
American Locomotive Company	S2	744 (first 744)	1949	1967–1969	Ex-Missouri Pacific Railroad. Traded to Western Pacific Railroad for second 744.
American Locomotive Company	S2	744 (second 744)	1943	1969–1970	Ex-Western Pacific.
American Locomotive Company	S2	745 (first 745)	1943	1967–1970	Ex-Missouri Pacific. Traded to Western Pacific for second 745.
American Locomotive Company	S2	745 (second 745)	1943	1970–1976	Ex-Western Pacific. Last locomotive owned by the railroad.
American Locomotive Company	RS1	746	1949	1970–1976	Ex-Spokane International Railway. Retired and sold to Central California Traction Company.
American Locomotive Company	RS1	747	1949	1970–1975	Ex-Spokane International. Retired and scrapped.

When traffic was heavy, steam engines and later diesels were borrowed from the Western Pacific Railroad. Electric freight motors were also borrowed from time to time from sister roads Sacramento Northern Railroad and Central California Traction until the electrification was abandoned. The TS never owned or operated a maintenance facility for its locomotives and cars. All work on the interurban cars and electric locomotives was performed by the CCT at their shops in Stockton. Repairs on TS steam and diesel locomotives, as well as freight cars and cabooses, were performed by the Western Pacific.

In the 1950s, the railroad built up a sizable fleet of freight cars, mostly insulated boxcars. One series of 25 cars wore a unique herald of a "Cornucopia" and bore the legend "Serving California's Heartland". This herald was one of the most colorful and complex ever used by an American railroad and is still remembered today. One of these cars is preserved at the Western Pacific Railroad Museum and its heralds has been restored, although they have been skillfully hand-painted, rather than being decals as in the original paint scheme.

== Preservation and survivors ==
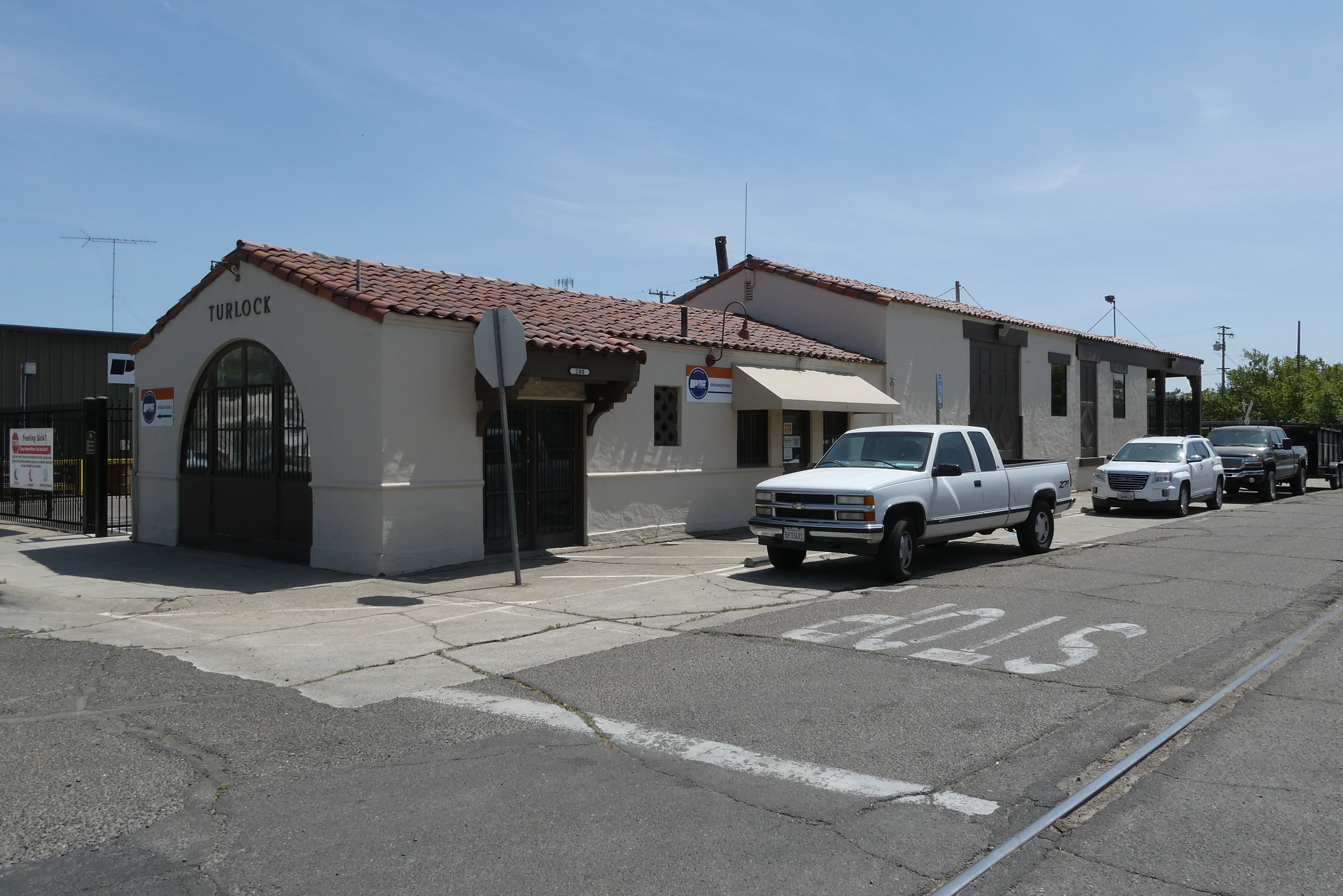
The former Turlock freight depot

TS interurban car 200 is stored indoors, unrestored, at the Western Railway Museum. Two of the famous Cornucopia freight cars are preserved at the Western Pacific Railroad Museum at Portola, along with a former Western Pacific bunk car. This car, TS 0565-H, was used as the depot in Escalon for many years after a fire destroyed the original station. Caboose 305 is preserved in Modesto and will eventually be placed on the former right of way in the northern section of the city, which has now been turned into a linear park.

Several other pieces of equipment also survive:

- Interurban car 202 is built into part of a barn on private property near Turlock.
- Caboose 307 is a private residence in Oakland.
- Caboose 308 is privately owned and fully restored in Modesto.
- A boxcar sits in an industrial yard in Beckwourth, California.
- Locomotive 735 sits derelict in Kansas City, Missouri.
- Locomotive 743 is stored out of service in South Dakota.
- Locomotive 746 is privately owned and derelict in Willits, California.

The only remaining depot building is the freight depot in Turlock. The Hotel Stockton, which had interurban offices and waiting area on its first floor, also survives.
