= List of people from Sacramento, California =

This is a list of notable people from the U.S. city of Sacramento, California.

== Artists ==
=== Acting, television and filmmaking ===
- Daniel Truhitte (born 1943), actor best known for playing Rolfe Gruber in The Sound of Music
- Odessa A'zion – actress
- Max Baer, Jr. – actor, director, The Beverly Hillbillies
- Adrienne Barbeau (born and raised) – actress
- Barbi Benton (raised) – model, Playboy Playmate
- Amanda Blake (resident) – actress, Gunsmoke
- Matt Braly (born and raised) – creator of Amphibia
- Scott Brazil (born and raised) – producer, Hill Street Blues, The Shield
- LeVar Burton (raised) – actor, Star Trek: The Next Generation
- Timothy Busfield (resident) – actor, producer, director
- Jessica Chastain (raised) – Oscar-winning actress
- Ray Collins – actor, Citizen Kane, Perry Mason
- Ann Doran – actress in Rebel Without A Cause
- Channing Dungey (born and raised) – producer, president of ABC Entertainment Group
- Merrin Dungey (born and raised) – actress
- Sam Elliott (born) – Golden Globe and Emmy-nominated actor
- Holly Fields – voice actress in Shrek franchise
- Jack Gallagher (resident) – comedian
- Virginia Gardner (born) – actress
- Greta Gerwig – Academy Award-nominated actress and filmmaker
- Mark Goodson (born) – television producer
- Ryan Guzman (raised) – actor
- Colin Hanks (born and raised) – actor
- Henry Hathaway (born) – Oscar-nominated director
- Gabrielle Haugh (born and raised) – actress
- Ian Hecox – comedian of Smosh
- Daniel Humbarger (resident) – stand-up comedian
- Jabbawockeez – dance crew (members Phil Tayag, Joe Larot and Kevin Brewer)
- Sam J. Jones – actor, Flash Gordon, Ted
- Chris Kelly (born and raised) – writer, director, producer
- Marlene Kos – video artist
- Brie Larson – Oscar-winning actress
- Larry Linville (raised) – actor on M*A*S*H
- Mr. Lobo – television personality, horror host
- Eric Lynch (resident) – member of the Wack Pack
- Randolph Mantooth (born) – actor
- Pat Morita (former resident) – Oscar-nominated actor
- Eddie Murphy – Oscar-nominated actor and comedian
- Anthony Padilla – comedian of Smosh
- Brian Posehn (born and raised) – comedian
- Keith Powers (born and raised) – actor
- Kelly Pryce – stand-up comedian
- Molly Ringwald (born and raised in greater area) – actress, jazz singer
- Scott Schwartz – actor
- Sab Shimono (born and raised) – actor
- Samantha Smith – actress, Supernatural
- Betsy Sodaro – actress, comedian
- Brenda Song (raised) – actress
- Eric Sheffer Stevens – actor
- Johnny Taylor, Jr. – stand-up comedian
- Timothy Thatcher – professional wrestler
- Danielle Moné Truitt – actress
- Mia Tyler – actress
- Mills Watson – actor
- Kimberly Weinberger (born and raised) – actress, Hemet, or the Landlady Don't Drink Tea
- Bob Wilkins – television personality
- Victor Wong (resident) – actor
- John Lloyd Young (born) – Tony-winning actor
- Waleed Zuaiter (born) – actor and producer

=== Broadcasting and journalism ===
- Mark S. Allen (resident) – television personality
- Stan Atkinson (resident) – television journalist
- Herb Caen – newspaper columnist
- Morton Downey Jr. – radio-television personality
- Bob Fouts – sportscaster
- John Gibson – media host
- Johnny Hyde – disc jockey, host of The Gear Show during the British Invasion
- Don Imus (career originated) – radio personality
- Mitchell Landsberg (born) – journalist
- Rush Limbaugh (career originated, former resident) – radio personality
- Lisa Ling – television personality
- Joan Lunden (attended CSUS, career originated) – television personality
- Rene Syler (raised, CSUS graduate) – host of The Early Show

=== Music ===
- !!! – band
- Lynn Anderson – country singer
- Anton Barbeau – singer-songwriter
- Blackalicious (originated) – hip-hop duo
- Brent Bourgeois – singer-songwriter
- Creed Bratton – actor, most famous as himself on The Office, original lead guitarist of The Grassroots
- Robert Brookins – member of Earth, Wind & Fire
- Brotha Lynch Hung – rapper
- C-Bo – rapper
- Cake – alternative rock band
- Geoffrey Carter – composer, musician, producer, and engineer
- Cause & Effect – electronica/synthpop band
- Craig Chaquico – Jefferson Starship guitarist
- Cimorelli – sibling pop group
- Club Nouveau – R&B group
- Doris Coley – singer with The Shirelles
- Johnny Colla – musician
- The Cramps – band
- Mark Curry – singer, songwriter
- Dance Gavin Dance – rock band
- Nataly Dawn – singer-songerwriter and half of the musical duo Pomplamoose
- David de Berry – composer
- Death Grips – experimental hip–hop group
- Dedekind Cut – experimental music artist
- Deftones – alternative metal band
- Vince DiFiore – trumpet, keyboard player for Cake
- DRS – hip hop/R&B
- El Hefe – guitarist for NOFX
- Endeverafter – band
- Far – band
- Frank French – drummer
- Suzi Gardner – founder of the band L7
- Kevin Gilbert – singer-songwriter
- Margaret Glaspy – singer-songwriter
- Jackie Greene – singer-songwriter, blues guitarist
- Lee Greenwood – country music artist
- Groovie Ghoulies – punk rock band
- Michael Hedges – guitarist
- Hella – band
- Hippie Sabotage – electronic duo
- David Hodo – singer in Village People
- Hoods – hardcore band
- James House – country music artist, songwriter
- Hobo Johnson – singer, rapper
- Daniel Johnston – singer-songwriter
- Dick Jurgens – swing music bandleader from the 30s & 40s
- King Never – progressive rock band
- Mary Love – R&B singer
- Richard Maloof – musician
- Mandisa – singer
- Marvaless – rapper
- Scott Mathews – record producer, percussionist
- Tim McCord – musician
- John McCrea – singer, guitar player for Cake
- Rose Melberg – musician
- Middle Class Rut – punk band
- Victoria Monet – singer
- Mozzy – rapper
- Gabe Nelson – bassist for Cake
- Oleander – alternative rock band
- OMB Peezy – rapper
- Charlie Peacock – singer, songwriter, record producer
- Gregory Porter – jazz singer
- Rufus Reid – jazz bassist, educator, and composer
- Cynthia Robinson – trumpeter and vocalist for Sly and the Family Stone
- Michael Roe – singer
- Sage The Gemini – rapper
- Saweetie – rapper
- Timothy B. Schmit – bassist and vocalist for the country/rock bands Poco and the Eagles
- Kevin Seconds – musician
- Kevin Sharp – country music singer
- Dawn Silva – singer
- Ruth Slenczynska – pianist and last living student of Sergei Rachmaninoff
- Jimmy Smith – jazz legend dubbed "King of the Hammond B–3 Organ"
- Spiral Starecase
- Steel Breeze – rock band
- Will Swan – guitarist
- T-Nutty – rapper
- Tesla – rock band
- Tycho – electronic musician
- Michael Urbano – drummer
- Jeff Watson – musician
- Chelsea Wolfe – singer-songwriter
- X-Raided – rapper
- Mary Youngblood – flutist

=== Writing ===
- Ann Bannon – pulp fiction author
- Deborah Blum – Pulitzer Prize-winning journalist and author
- Dale Brown – adventure–suspense novelist
- Jim Burke – English teacher and author of books on teaching
- Herb Caen – legendary and longtime columnist for the San Francisco Chronicle
- Biba Caggiano – cookbook author, restaurateur
- Raymond Carver – short–story writer, lived in Sacramento, set several works there
- John D. Cox – author of general–audience books about weather, storms, meteorology
- Pete Dexter (resident) – novelist, journalist
- Joan Didion (born and raised) – author, journalist, screenwriter
- William Everson – aka Brother Antoninus, poet
- Eric Hansen – travel writer
- Richard Hellesen – playwright
- Bob Devin Jones – playwright
- Karen Kijewski – mystery novelist
- Philip Levine – poet
- Dale Maharidge – Pulitzer Prize-winning author
- Jose Montoya – Chicano poet, Sacramento Poet Laureate
- Reneau Z. Peurifoy – author of self–help books
- Richard Rodriguez – essayist
- Dennis Schmitz – Sacramento Poet Laureate
- Nicholas Sparks (former resident) – novelist
- Lincoln Steffens – investigative journalist, muckraker
- Spencer Stone – Air Force veteran, co-author The 15:17 to Paris
- Anthony Swofford – novelist and Marine veteran
- William T. Vollmann – National Book Award-winning author and journalist

=== Other ===
- Robert Dawson – photographer
- Richard Staples Dodge – illustrator
- Ray Kaiser Eames – designer
- Harry Fonseca – artist
- David Garibaldi (resident) – performance artist
- Ralph Goings – artist
- Rudolf Hess – German Expressionist painter and art critic
- Gregory Kondos – artist
- Peter Wayne Lewis – artist
- Tim Ocel – opera and theater director
- May O'Donnell – modern dancer
- Mel Ramos – artist
- Nia Sanchez – 2014 Miss USA
- Dominic Sandoval – dancer
- Fritz Scholder – Native American artist
- Wayne Thiebaud – artist, professor
- Adrian Tomine – cartoonist, illustrator

== Athletes ==
=== Baseball ===
==== Active ====
- Daniel Descalso – infielder for Chicago Cubs
- Andy Fox – third baseman and hitting coach for Jackson Generals
- Preston Guilmet – pitcher for Toronto Blue Jays
- David Hernandez – pitcher for Tecolotes de los Dos Laredos
- Rhys Hoskins – first baseman for the Milwaukee Brewers
- J.P. Howell – pitcher for San Rafael Pacifics
- Aaron Judge – outfielder for New York Yankees
- Nathan Lukes – outfielder for Toronto Blue Jays
- Manny Parra – pitcher for Leones de Yucatán
- Max Stassi – catcher for Chicago White Sox
- Rowdy Tellez – first baseman/DH, Atlanta Braves
- Logan Webb – pitcher for San Francisco Giants

==== Inactive ====
- Dusty Baker – outfielder, three-time manager of the year
- Jim Barr – pitcher for San Francisco Giants and Los Angeles Angels
- Cuno Barragan – catcher for Chicago Cubs
- Jeff Blauser – shortstop, 1995 World Series champion
- Dan Boitano – pitcher with four MLB teams
- Chris Bosio – pitcher with Milwaukee Brewers and Seattle Mariners
- Larry Bowa – shortstop, five-time All-Star, manager, Philadelphia Phillies coach
- John Bowker – outfielder and first baseman
- Dallas Braden – pitcher, Oakland Athletics perfect game on May 9, 2010
- Bobby Clark – outfielder, California Angels, Milwaukee Brewers
- Royce Clayton – infielder for 11 MLB teams
- Doug Davis – pitcher
- Jermaine Dye – right fielder, MVP of 2005 World Series
- Bob Elliott – infielder and outfielder, seven-time All-Star and manager
- Bob Forsch – pitcher, 1982 World Series champion
- Ken Forsch – pitcher, two-time All-Star
- Stan Hack – infielder, five-time All-Star
- Doug Henry – pitcher for five teams
- Steve Holm – catcher
- Jay Hughes – pitcher for Los Angeles Dodgers
- Joe Inglett – infielder
- Dion James – outfielder
- Geoff Jenkins – outfielder with Milwaukee Brewers
- Nick Johnson – MLB infielder
- Nippy Jones – Milwaukee Braves pinch hitter involved in “the shoe polish incident” in the 1957 World Series
- Spider Jorgensen – Brooklyn Dodgers, NY Giants scout
- Brandon League – pitcher for Los Angeles Dodgers
- Derrek Lee – infielder, 2003 World Series champion
- Randy Lerch – pitcher for four teams
- Brad Lidge – pitcher, 2008 World Series champion
- Mike Lincoln – pitcher
- Jerry Manuel – infielder, manager of New York Mets and Chicago White Sox, TV analyst
- Mike Marjama – catcher
- Buck Martinez – catcher, manager and sportscaster
- Ryan Mattheus – pitcher
- Mark McLemore – pitcher for Houston Astros
- John McNamara – manager
- Marc Newfield – outfielder for Seattle Mariners, San Diego Padres, and Milwaukee Brewers
- Rowland Office – outfielder
- Darren Oliver – pitcher
- Dustin Pedroia – second baseman for Boston Red Sox
- Geno Petralli – catcher
- Jeremy Powell – pitcher
- Jerry Royster – third baseman, manager of Las Vegas 51s
- Dick Ruthven – pitcher, 1980 World Series champion
- F.P. Santangelo – player, sportscaster
- Steve Sax – All–Star second baseman, two-time World Series champion
- Bud Stewart – outfielder
- Mike Thomas – pitcher
- Greg Vaughn – All–Star outfielder
- Randy Veres – pitcher for five teams
- Fernando Viña – infielder for five teams
- John Vukovich – infielder for three teams; manager of Chicago Cubs and Philadelphia Phillies
- Matt Walbeck – catcher
- Wally Westlake – utility player, National League All-Star
- Tim Wheeler (born 1988) – professional baseball player; 2011Texas League home run champion.
- Vance Worley – pitcher
- Charlie Zink – pitcher for Boston Red Sox

=== Basketball ===
- David Ancrum (born 1958) – basketball shooting guard, top scorer in the 1994 Israel Basketball Premier League
- Ryan Anderson – Miami Heat forward
- Matt Barnes – former NBA forward
- Keita Bates-Diop – NBA small forward with Brooklyn Nets
- Ruthie Bolton – former WNBA guard
- Bill Cartwright – NBA center who played for three teams and won three championships
- Omri Casspi – Israeli NBA forward
- Marquese Chriss – NBA power forward
- David Cooke – one–year NBA forward with the Sacramento Kings
- James Donaldson – British-American former NBA center
- Jim Eakins – former NBA/ABA center
- Darnell Hillman – former NBA and ABA forward
- Mel Hutchins – former NBA forward
- Ike Iroegbu (born 1995) – American-born Nigerian basketball player for Hapoel Galil Elyon of the Israeli Basketball Premier League
- Bobby Jackson – former NBA guard, coach of Stockton Kings
- Kevin Johnson – NBA guard for Phoenix Suns, mayor of Sacramento
- Joel Jones – Puerto Rican national basketball team
- Jim Loscutoff – former NBA forward
- Rich Manning – former NBA forward
- Jared McCain (born 2004) – Oklahoma City Thunder guard
- DeMarcus Nelson – former NBA and Duke guard, attended Sheldon High School
- René Rougeau (born 1986) – basketball forward for Maccabi Haifa of the Israeli Basketball Premier League
- Michael Stewart – former NBA center who played for five teams
- Don Verlin – men's basketball coach at the University of Idaho
- Jaylen Wells (born 2003) – Memphis Grizzlies small forward and shooting guard
- D. J. Wilson – Milwaukee Bucks forward

=== Boxing ===
- Max Baer – former world heavyweight boxing champion
- Diego Corrales – former world lightweight and junior lightweight boxing champion
- Loreto Garza – super lightweight world champion
- Willie Jorrin – former Super Bantamweight champion
- Juan Lazcano – light welterweight boxer
- Tony Lopez – former world super featherweight and lightweight boxing champion
- Pete Ranzany – welterweight boxer

=== Football ===
==== Active (NFL) ====
- Arik Armstead – defensive end for Jacksonville Jaguars
- Clancy Barone – tight ends coach for San Diego Chargers
- Ian Book – quarterback for Philadelphia Eagles
- Ross Dwelley – tight end for San Francisco 49ers
- Jordan Kunaszyk – linebacker for Cleveland Brownsch for Green Bay Packers
- Terrance Mitchell – backup cornerback for Chicago Bears
- Shaq Thompson – linebacker for Carolina Panthers
- Leonard Williams – defensive lineman for Seattle Seahawks

==== Arena Football League and Canadian Football League ====
- Dek Bake – defensive tackle for Saskatchewan Roughriders
- Marko Cavka – offensive lineman for Hamilton Tiger-Cats
- Bobby Dawson – defensive back in Canadian Football League
- Eddie Elder – defensive back for Ottawa Redblacks
- Aaron Garcia – quarterback for New York Dragons
- Etu Molden – wide receiver/defensive back for Chicago Rush
- Ricky Ray – quarterback for Toronto Argonauts
- Charles Roberts – running back for BC Lions
- Isaiah Ross – offensive lineman for Nashville Kats
- Damen Wheeler – defensive back for Los Angeles Avengers

==== Inactive ====
- Robert Awalt – tight end
- Justin Bannan – defensive tackle for Baltimore Ravens
- Matt Bouza – wide receiver for San Francisco 49ers and Indianapolis Colts
- Jim Breech – placekicker for Oakland Raiders and Cincinnati Bengals
- Lance Briggs – linebacker for Chicago Bears, seven-time Pro Bowl selection
- Tedy Bruschi – linebacker, won three Super Bowls with New England Patriots
- Dan Bunz – linebacker won two Super Bowls with San Francisco 49ers
- Donald Butler – linebacker for San Diego Chargers
- Giovanni Carmazzi – quarterback, third–round draft pick by San Francisco 49ers
- Rae Carruth – NFL wide receiver found guilty of conspiracy to murder girlfriend
- Kevin Clark – Denver Broncos cornerback, appeared in two Super Bowls
- Erik Coleman – safety for Atlanta Falcons
- Rick Cunningham – lineman
- Ralph DeLoach – football player
- Don Doll – Pro Bowl defensive back
- Daniel Fells – tight end for Tampa Bay Buccaneers
- Mike Flanagan – center for Houston Texans
- Malcolm Floyd – wide receiver for Houston/Tennessee Oilers and St. Louis Rams
- Malcom Floyd – backup wide receiver for San Diego Chargers
- Scott Galbraith – tight end
- Leland Glass – wide receiver
- Harold Green – running back
- Rodney Hannah – tight end for Dallas Cowboys
- Spencer Havner – linebacker for Green Bay Packers
- Gary Hoffman – defensive back
- Adam Jennings – wide receiver for Detroit Lions
- Charles Mann – defensive tackle for Washington Redskins
- Trevor Matich – lineman
- Marcus McCauley – defensive back for Minnesota Vikings
- Bill Munson – quarterback
- Darrin Nelson – running back
- Ken O'Brien – quarterback for New York Jets and Philadelphia Eagles
- Chris Oldham – defensive back
- J. T. O'Sullivan – quarterback for Cincinnati Bengals
- Mike Patterson – defensive tackle for the Philadelphia Eagles
- Lonie Paxton – long snapper for New England Patriots
- James Phelan – player, coach in College Football Hall of Fame
- Eason Ramson – tight end
- Tom Rehder – lineman for Super Bowl champion New York Giants
- Ricky Reynolds – defensive tackle
- Don Rogers – safety for Cleveland Browns
- Reggie Rogers – defensive end for Detroit Lions
- Ken Rose – linebacker
- Adrian Ross – linebacker for Cincinnati Bengals and Pittsburgh Steelers
- Ephraim Salaam – offensive tackle for Houston Texans
- Jason Sehorn – cornerback for New York Giants and St. Louis Rams
- Onterrio Smith – running back for Minnesota Vikings and CFL's Winnipeg Blue Bombers
- Donté Stallworth – wide receiver for Cleveland Browns
- Shane Steichen – head coach of Indianapolis Colts
- Sammie Stroughter – wide receiver for Tampa Bay Buccaneers
- Syd'Quan Thompson – cornerback
- Alex Van Dyke – wide receiver for New York Jets and Philadelphia Eagles, two-time All-American in college
- C. J. Wallace – safety for Seattle Seahawks
- Seneca Wallace – quarterback for Cleveland Browns
- Paris Warren – wide receiver for Tampa Bay Buccaneers
- Austin Wentworth – guard for Minnesota Vikings
- Gerald Willhite – running back for Denver Broncos
- D. J. Williams – linebacker for Denver Broncos

=== Golf ===
- Brad Bell – PGA Tour and European Tour golfer
- Cameron Champ – PGA Tour golfer
- Natalie Gulbis – LPGA golfer
- Brian Henninger – PGA Tour golfer
- Tom Johnson – PGA Tour golfer
- Spencer Levin – PGA Tour golfer
- Bob Lunn – PGA Tour golfer
- Scott McCarron – PGA Tour golfer
- Kevin Sutherland – PGA Tour golfer
- Nick Watney – PGA Tour golfer

=== Martial arts ===
- Urijah Faber – professional mixed martial arts fighter in the UFC and former WEC featherweight champion
- Tyson Griffin – professional mixed martial arts fighter in the UFC
- James Irvin – professional mixed martial arts fighter in the UFC
- Chad Mendes – professional mixed martial arts fighter in the UFC
- Scott Smith – professional mixed martial arts fighter in the UFC
- David Terrell – professional mixed martial arts fighter in the UFC
- Christian Wellisch – professional mixed martial arts fighter in the UFC

=== Olympians ===
- Evelyn Ashford – five–time track medalist in 100–meter and 4 × 100 m relay at five Olympic Games
- Ruthie Bolton – women's basketball 1996 and 2000 Olympic gold medalist
- Ben Nighthorse Campbell – captain of the judo team at 1964 Summer Olympics
- Kim Conley – distance runner at 2012 and 2016 Summer Olympics
- Malachi Davis – ran in 400–meter and 4x100-meter relay at 2000 Summer Olympics for the United Kingdom
- Gabriel Gardner – opposite hitter for U.S. volleyball team at 2008 Summer Olympics
- Kate Grace – mid-distance runner at 2016 Summer Olympics
- Eric Heiden – five-time gold medalist speed skater
- Sheila Hudson – finished 10th in triple jump at 1996 Summer Olympics
- Tommy Kono – three–time medalist in weightlifting, 1952, 1956, 1960
- Brian Lewis – gold medalist in 4x100–meter relay at 2000 Summer Olympics
- Lauren McFall – bronze medalist as part of the synchronized swimming team at 2004 Summer Olympics
- Debbie Meyer – three–time Olympic gold medalist swimmer at 1968 Summer Olympics
- Derek Miles – finished seventh in pole vault at 2004 Summer Olympics
- Billy Mills – gold medalist, track, in the 10,000 meters at the 1964 Tokyo Summer Olympics
- Jamie Nieto – finished fourth in high jump at 2004 Summer Olympics
- Leonard "Harvey" Nitz – 1984 cycling silver and bronze medalist, four-time Olympian
- Roger "Jack" Parker – bronze medalist in decathlon at 1936 Berlin Olympics
- Susan Pedersen – swimming gold medalist in 1968 Summer Olympics
- Miguel Ángel Ponce – gold medal winner, soccer, 2012 Summer Olympics
- Vladimir Sabich – finished fifth in the slalom at 1968 Winter Olympics
- Summer Sanders – gold medalist swimmer at 1992 Summer Olympics and broadcaster
- George Schroth – swimmer, bronze medalist in 1924 Olympics
- Mark Spitz – seven-time gold medalist swimmer
- George Stanich – bronze medalist in high jump at 1948 Summer Olympics
- Michael Stember – middle-distance runner at 2000 Summer Olympics
- Chloe Sutton – member of 2008 Summer Olympics U.S. women's swim team
- Casey Weathers – member of 2008 Summer Olympics United States baseball team
- Mary Whipple – silver medalist in women's eight rowing at 2004 Summer Olympics

=== Soccer ===
- Miguel Aguilar – defender
- Sebastian Anderson – defender
- Fidel Barajas – forward
- Chad Bartlomé – forward
- Shaft Brewer Jr. – defender/forward
- Quincy Butler – forward
- Sean Michael Callahan – midfielder
- Drake Callender – goalkeeper
- Julian Chavez – midfielder
- D. J. Countess – goalkeeper
- Steve Cronin – goalkeeper
- Kevin Goldthwaite – defender
- Taylor Graham – defender
- Ryan Hollingshead – midfielder/defender
- Patrick Ianni – defender and Olympian
- Adam Jahn – forward/midfielder
- Amobi Okugo – midfielder
- Miguel Ángel Ponce – defender
- Tommy Thompson – forward
- Mark White – goalkeeper

=== Other ===
- Marcus Arroyo – head coach for UNLV Rebels football
- Randall Bal – member of the U.S. men's swim team
- Cameron Beaubier – motorcycle racer
- Shadrack Kiptoo Biwott – marathoner
- Jeremy Buendia – four-time Olympia men's physique champion
- Scott Burnett – darts player
- Sally Edwards – triathlete
- Jacob Fatu – professional wrestler
- Patty Fendick – WTA Tour tennis Stanford Cardinal player
- Vic Grimes – professional wrestler
- Joey Hand – racer, American Le Mans Series and Grand–Am
- Alex Honnold – big wall free solo climber
- Kyle Larson – professional racer, NASCAR driver
- Alycia Moulton – WTA Tour tennis Stanford Cardinal player
- Scott Pruett – racer (NASCAR, Champ Car, IMSA GT, Trans Am and Grand–Am)
- Kort Schubert – former national team member and blindside flanker for USA Rugby
- Blaine Scully – former fullback and national team captain of USA Rugby
- Solo Sikoa – professional wrestler
- Louis Stanfill – national team member and blindside flanker for USA Rugby
- Delano Thomas – member of the United States men's volleyball team
- Sam Warburg – tennis player

== Business ==
- Scott Boras – sports agent, former minor league baseball player
- Charles Frederick Crocker – vice president of Southern Pacific Transportation Company
- George Crocker – vice president of Southern Pacific Transportation Company
- William Henry Crocker – president of Crocker National Bank
- Mark Hopkins Jr. – co-founder of Central Pacific Railroad
- Sherwood Johnson – founder of Shakey's pizza restaurant
- Charles R. Schwab (born) – founder of Charles Schwab Corporation
- David Emerson Root – director, Sacramento Occupational Medical Group
- Russ Solomon – founder of Tower Records
- Leland Stanford – co-founder of Central Pacific Railroad, founder of Stanford University, governor
- Angelo Tsakopoulos – real estate developer

== Government and civics ==
- Xavier Becerra – attorney general of California and former U.S. secretary of Health and Human Services
- John Bigler – governor of California, Ambassador to Chile
- Rob Bonta -- attorney general of California
- Betsy Butler – member of the California State Assembly
- Ward Connerly – founder of American Civil Rights Institute
- Edwin B. Crocker – California Supreme Court justice, founder of Crocker Art Museum
- Roger Dickinson – California state assemblyman
- Tani Cantil-Sakauye – chief justice of California
- Grove L. Johnson – U.S. representative
- Hiram Johnson – governor of California, U.S. senator
- J. Neely Johnson – governor of California
- Dave Jones – California insurance commissioner
- Charles West Kendall – U.S. representative
- Anthony Kennedy – U.S. Supreme Court justice
- Bill Kennemer – Oregon state senator
- Eleni Kounalakis – lieutenant governor of California
- Herman "Ace" Lawson – Sacramento city councilman, pilot with the Tuskegee Airmen
- Goodwin Liu – California Supreme Court justice
- Doris Matsui – member of the U.S. House of Representatives
- Robert Matsui – member of the U.S. House of Representatives
- Kevin McCarty – former member of California State Assembly, mayor of Sacramento
- Jim McClarin – member of the New Hampshire House of Representatives
- Austin Quinn-Davidson – mayor of Anchorage, Alaska
- Joe Serna Jr. – professor, former mayor of Sacramento
- Darrell Steinberg – former mayor of Sacramento, former state senator

== Military ==
- John F. Madden, U.S. Army brigadier general
- William B. Rochester, paymaster-general of the United States Army
- Jerry Shriver, U.S. Army special forces and MACV-SOG soldier

== Academics and science ==
- Richard O. Buckius – professor, COO of the National Science Foundation
- Frederick W. Hatch – physician, educator, medical pioneer in Sacramento
- Christina Hulbe – Antarctic researcher, glaciologist
- Harvey Itano – biochemist, medical researcher at Caltech, UC San Diego
- Stuart Kauffman (born 1939), theoretical biologist, and complex systems analyst
- Bennet Omalu – forensic pathologist, professor at UC Davis School of Medicine
- Michelle Rhee – teacher, education administrator
- Mary Tsukamoto – educator, cultural historian, and civil rights activist
- Cornel West – philosopher, professor, author
- David J. Wineland – physicist, 2012 Nobel laureate

== Crime ==
- Michael Avenatti – convicted of wire fraud and aggravated identity theft
- Paul Bilzerian – financier convicted of securities fraud
- Richard Chase – serial killer, cannibal, necrophile, and mass murderer
- Joseph James DeAngelo – serial killer and serial rapist known as the Golden State Killer
- Gerald and Charlene Gallego – serial killers
- Warren Jeffs – former church president and convicted sex offender
- Roger Kibbe – serial killer
- Rodney King – victim of police brutality whose attack helped spark the 1992 Los Angeles riots
- Theresa Knorr – child murderer and torturer
- Hunter Moore – created revenge porn website Is Anyone Up?
- Dorothea Puente – serial killer known for burying boarders in backyard
- Morris Solomon Jr. – serial killer
- Nikolay Soltys – spree killer of six family members
