= Cosumnes Oaks High School =

Location
- 8350 Lotz Parkway; Elk Grove Unified School District; Elk Grove, Sacramento County, California 95757; United States
- 38°23′55.51″N 121°23′48.72″W

Information
- Type: Public
- Established: 2009
- School district: Elk Grove Unified School District
- Principal: Zachary Cheney
- Teaching staff: 97.20 (FTE)
- Grades: 9 - 12
- Enrollment: 2,151 (2023-2024)
- Student to teacher ratio: 22.13
- Color
- Song: Alma Mater
- Mascot: The Wolfpack
- Feeder schools: Elizabeth Pinkerton Middle School
- Website: cohs.egusd.net

Cosumnes Oaks High School (pronounced kuh-sum-ness), or COHS, is a preparatory four-year public high school in Elk Grove, California. It is the youngest high school of the Elk Grove Unified School District, opening in 2009 with the Class of 2012 being its first class of graduating seniors. In 2012 Cosumnes Oaks was officially accredited by the Western Association of Schools and Colleges (WASC).

The school is named after Cosumnes River and the many oak trees in the area, creating a strong link between the school and the Cosumnes River Preserve. The school serves students in the south-central end of Elk Grove and several communities near Cosumnes River Preserve and Stone Lakes National Wildlife Refuge.

== On campus ==
Cosumnes Oaks is built using the same blueprint as Franklin High School, Monterey Trail High School & Pleasant Grove High School.

== Stadium ==
The Cosumnes Oaks-Franklin Community Stadium is a multi-use outdoor stadium used by Cosumnes Oaks High School during their home games. It used as the home stadium for the Franklin and Cosumnes Oaks football teams as well as the Cosumnes Oaks soccer teams. The stadium is also shared by Franklin High School.

== Sexual abuse crisis ==
Cosumnes Oaks Geography teacher Monte Antonio Reed, who was also a freshman football and basketball coach, was convicted of child sexual abuse of three Cosumnes Oaks students, a 15 year old student who was enrolled in his honors class and her younger sister and cousin. The abuse happened in 2016 and 2017. The teacher was convicted of two counts of sexual intercourse with a minor under 16 years of age, three counts of oral copulation of a person under 16, one count of anal penetration by a foreign object on a person under 16, two counts of molestation of a person under 18, and two counts of lewd act upon a child. He was sentenced to nine years in prison in September 2019. The case was one of a number of cases of sexual abuse of students by Elk Grove Unified teachers and resulted in accusations that the district did not take students seriously and did not have proper training and policies to prevent sexual abuse of students.

== Controversy ==
In 2016, Cosumnes Oaks was in the news after school officials had an African-American student removed from his graduation ceremony by Sacramento County Sheriff's Department officers because he refused to take off a kente cloth representing his Ghanaian heritage. The student also stated in another article that he knew he was breaking the rules by wearing the cloth since the cloth was not approved by the district. Only items issued or approved by the district were allowed to be worn during the graduation ceremony.

== Notable alumni ==
- Oluwafemi Oladejo, NFL linebacker for the Tennessee Titans
