= Klayton Adams =

American football coach (born 1983)

Dallas Cowboys
- Title: Offensive coordinator

Personal information
- Born: February 13, 1983 (age 43); Sacramento, California, U.S.
- Listed height: 5 ft 11 in (1.80 m)
- Listed weight: 293 lb (133 kg)

Career information
- Position: Offensive lineman
- High school: Sheldon (Vineyard, California)
- College: Boise State

Career history
- Boise State (2005–2006) Graduate assistant; Western Washington (2007–2008) Run game coordinator & offensive line coach; Sacramento State (2009-2010); Offensive tackles coach & tight ends coach (2009); Offensive line coach (2010); San Jose State (2011–2012) Tight ends coach; Colorado (2013–2018); Running backs coach & tight ends coach (2013-2015); Offensive line coach (2016-2017); Co-offensive coordinator & offensive line coach (2018); Indianapolis Colts (2019–2022); Assistant offensive line coach (2019-2020); Tight ends coach (2021-2022); Arizona Cardinals (2023–2024) Offensive line coach; Dallas Cowboys (2025–present) Offensive coordinator

Awards and highlights
- As player: All–WAC Second Team (2004)
- Coaching profile at Pro Football Reference

Klayton Adams (born February 13, 1983) is an American professional football coach who is the offensive coordinator for the Dallas Cowboys of the National Football League (NFL). He previously served as an assistant coach for the Arizona Cardinals, at the University of Colorado Boulder, San Jose State University, Sacramento State University, Western Washington University, Boise State University, and Indianapolis Colts.

== Early life ==
Adams was born February 13, 1983 in Sacramento, California and attended Sheldon High School in Vineyard, California where he lettered in football, wrestling and track and field.

== Playing career ==
Adams initially played junior college football at American River College near his hometown Sacramento and initially wanted to convert to linebacker but was persuaded not to by his coach. He proceeded to walk-on at Boise State where he was named a second team All-WAC selection his senior year as an offensive lineman.

== Coaching career ==
=== Boise State ===
Upon the conclusion of his playing career at Boise State, Adams began his coaching career at his alma mater as graduate assistant in 2005. He went on to coach at Western Washington as the run game coordinator and offensive line coach until the football program was shut down in 2008. He also had stints coaching at Sacramento State and San Jose State.

==== Colorado ====
Following the hire of San Jose State head coach Mike MacIntyre as the head coach at Colorado, Adams joined his coaching staff as the running backs and tight ends coach. He was shifted to offensive line coach in 2016, and later added the title of co-offensive coordinator ahead of the 2018 season.

==== Indianapolis Colts ====
Initially taking a position at Wyoming as their offensive line coach, Adams left to become the assistant offensive line coach for the Indianapolis Colts in 2019. After initially joining the Arizona State coaching staff in 2021, Adams opted to return to the Colts as their tight ends coach.

==== Arizona Cardinals ====
The Cardinals hired Adams as their offensive line coach on February 20, 2023. Adams had originally accepted a coaching position with the Stanford Cardinal, but chose instead to accept an offer from the Arizona Cardinals to become their offensive line coach.

At the conclusion of the 2023 season, the Cardinals finished 4th in total rushing yards with 2365 and also finished 4th in yards per game with 139.1 amongst all teams.

For the 2024 season, the Cardinals finished in the top 10 for both total rushing yards and yards per game. Also during the 2024 season, the Cardinals were the 5th best team at pass protection having allowed only 30 sacks.

==== Dallas Cowboys ====
The Dallas Cowboys hired Adams as offensive coordinator on January 31, 2025, to replace Brian Schottenheimer, who was promoted to head coach.
