= Alex Cook (American football) =

American football player (born 1999)

Profile
- Position: Safety

Personal information
- Born: May 21, 1999 (age 27); Sacramento, California, U.S.
- Listed height: 6 ft 0 in (1.83 m)
- Listed weight: 195 lb (88 kg)

Career information
- High school: Sheldon (Vineyard, California)
- College: Washington (2017–2022)
- NFL draft: 2023: undrafted

Career history
- New York Giants (2023)*; Carolina Panthers (2023–2024); New York Giants (2024)*; Chicago Bears (2025)*; Birmingham Stallions (2026); Los Angeles Rams (2026)*
- * Offseason or practice squad member only

Awards and highlights
- Second-team All-Pac-12 (2022)

Career NFL statistics as of 2024
- Total tackles: 11
- Stats at Pro Football Reference

Alex Cook (born May 21, 1999) is an American professional football safety. He played college football for the Washington Huskies and was signed as an undrafted free agent by the New York Giants in 2023.

== Early life ==
Alex Cook was born on May 21, 1999, in Sacramento, California. Cook attended Sheldon High School in Elk Grove, California, a suburb of Sacramento. He played both offense and defense for the Sheldon High School football team.

== College career ==
Rated as the 220th-best prospect in the nation, Cook chose to attend the University of Washington and play football there. In 2017, Cook redshirted and thus did not play the entire year. The next year, Cook played in twelve games and started one as a wide receiver. Cook changed his position during his redshirt sophomore year, becoming a defensive back and playing in all thirteen games for Washington. In 2020, due to the COVID-19 pandemic, the season for Washington was shortened, and thus Cook only started three out of all four games. Cook then started nine out of the eleven games he played in his redshirt senior year. Because of the shortened season due to the COVID-19 pandemic, Cook was allowed to play one more season for Washington. In this season, Cook started in all thirteen games and was named to the All-Pac-12 Conference Second team.

== Professional career ==
Pre-draft measurables
Height	Weight	Arm length	Hand span	Wingspan	40-yard dash	10-yard split	20-yard split	20-yard shuttle	Three-cone drill	Vertical jump	Broad jump	Bench press
6 ft 0 1/4 in (1.84 m)	195 lb (88 kg)	30 3/8 in (0.77 m)	9 1/2 in (0.24 m)	6 ft 3 3/8 in (1.91 m)	4.71 s	1.64 s	2.71 s	4.19 s	6.98 s	32.5 in (0.83 m)	9 ft 11 in (3.02 m)	10 reps
All values from Pro Day

=== New York Giants (first stint) ===
After going undrafted in the 2023 NFL draft, Cook was signed as an undrafted free agent by the New York Giants. Cook did not make the active roster for the Giants but was signed to their practice squad.

=== Carolina Panthers ===
On October 17, 2023, the Carolina Panthers signed Cook to their active roster off the Giants' practice squad.

On August 27, 2024, Cook was waived by the Panthers and re-signed to the practice squad. He was released on December 3.

=== New York Giants (second stint) ===
On December 26, 2024, Cook was signed to the New York Giants' practice squad.

=== Chicago Bears ===
On January 22, 2025, Cook signed a reserve/future contract with the Chicago Bears. He was waived on August 25.

=== Birmingham Stallions ===
On January 14, 2026, Cook was selected by the Birmingham Stallions of the United Football League (UFL).

=== Los Angeles Rams ===
On July 27, 2026, Cook signed with the Los Angeles Rams. He was waived by the Rams on August 29.
