= Darin Johnson =

American basketball player (born 1995)

Kadrina Karud
- Position: Shooting guard

Personal information
- Born: January 21, 1995 (age 31) Sacramento, California
- Listed height: 6 ft 6 in (1.98 m)
- Listed weight: 191 lb (87 kg)

Career information
- High school: Franklin (Elk Grove, California); Sheldon (Sacramento, California)
- College: Washington (2013–2015); Cal State Northridge (2016–2017)
- NBA draft: 2018: undrafted
- Playing career: 2017–present

Career history
- 2017–2018: Delaware 87ers
- 2019: Rayos de Hermosillo
- 2019–2020: Maree Basketball Club
- Stats at Basketball Reference

Darin Eugene Johnson (born January 21, 1995) is an American basketball player who last played for the Maree Basketball Club, a professional basketball team in Ireland.

== High school and college career ==
Johnson played at Franklin High School in Elk Grove, California, and Sheldon High School in Sacramento, California, where he was a four star prospect before enrolling at the University of Washington in 2013. He averaged 5.9 points and 1.6 rebounds as a freshman and 4.4 points as well as 1.6 boards per contest his sophomore year. After two years with the Huskies, Johnson transferred to Cal State Northridge. Coach Reggie Theus said, "Darin has a very quick step, is strong, gets to the rim quickly, is a good mid-range shooter and his style of play will fit in perfectly at CSUN." He had sat out the 2015–16 season and made his debut for the Matadors in 2016–17, appearing in 30 contests as a junior, producing 13.8 points, 3.7 rebounds and 1.7 assists a game.

Johnson opted to forgo his remaining college eligibility and turned pro at the conclusion of the 2016–17 campaign, entering the 2017 NBA draft. He was invited to attend a pre-draft workout with the Sacramento Kings. He was one of two players to withdraw from the draft and not return to college.

== Professional career ==
Johnson was selected by the Delaware 87ers with the 12th pick in the 2017 NBA G League Draft. In his first season he averaged 6.2 points, 1.9 rebounds and 0.7 assists per game. Johnson was signed by the Philadelphia 76ers on October 12, 2018. He was waived the next day. Johnson was added to the Delaware Blue Coats training camp roster.

Johnson signed with Rayos de Hermosillo in Mexico for the 2019 CIBACOPA season. He joined Maree Basketball Club of the Irish Super League in September 2019. Johnson was named to the All-Star Third Team.
