= Elk Grove Unified School District =

School district in southern Sacramento County, California, United States

Coordinates: 38.4131°N 121.3716°W

Address
- 9510 Elk Grove-Florin Road Elk Grove, California, 95624; United States

District information
- Type: Public
- Grades: K–12
- Established: 1959
- Superintendent: David E. Reilly
- Budget: $1.15 billion
- NCES District ID: 0612330

Students and staff
- Students: 63,157 (2020–2021)
- Teachers: 2,722.23 (FTE)
- Staff: 3,043.64 (FTE)
- Student–teacher ratio: 23.2:1

Other information
- Website: www.egusd.net

The Elk Grove Unified School District is a school district in southern Sacramento County, California, United States.

The Elk Grove Unified School District is the fifth largest school district in California and the largest in northern California.

Located in southern Sacramento County, the district covers 320 square miles (830 km^{2}). For the 2007–08 school year, the district served more than 61,000 students. More than 80 languages and dialects are spoken by over 63,000 Elk Grove Unified students.

The district has 69 schools: 44 elementary schools, 9 middle schools, 9 high schools, seven alternative education schools: three continuation schools, an adult school, a special education school, a charter school, and an online academy.

The district is governed by a publicly elected seven-member Board of Education, each of whom serves a four-year term.The Board of Education also includes an appointed preferential voting student board member.

== Boundary ==
The district serves all of Elk Grove, Florin, Franklin, Rancho Murieta and Vineyard, most of Wilton and sections of Mather, Parkway, Rancho Cordova and Sacramento.

== History ==
Today the Elk Grove Unified School District's boundaries cover 320 square miles (830 km^{2}), stretching almost from the Sacramento River to the foothills of Amador County.

The district is the result of the unification of smaller districts that date back to the 19th century.

The elementary school district known as "Elk Grove" was formed in 1866 and is one of the oldest in the state of California. The Elk Grove Union High School District followed almost 30 years later opening in 1892.

The unification of the Elk Grove district took place in 1959 under the leadership of County Superintendent T.R. Smedberg, a former superintendent of Elk Grove Union High School District. The elementary districts that unified with the high school district included: Elk Grove, Sierra-Enterprise, Franklin, Cosumnes, Dillard, Florin, and Pleasant Grove.

Elk Grove Unified has only had seven superintendents in its 67-year history.

- 1959 to 1968 – George Kibby
- 1969 to 1983 – Glenn Houde
- 1983 to 1995 – Robert L. Trigg
- 1995 to 2004 – David W. Gordon
- 2004 to 2014 – Steven M. Ladd
- 2014 to 2025 – Christopher R. Hoffman
- 2026 to present – David E. Reilly

== Schools ==
=== High schools ===
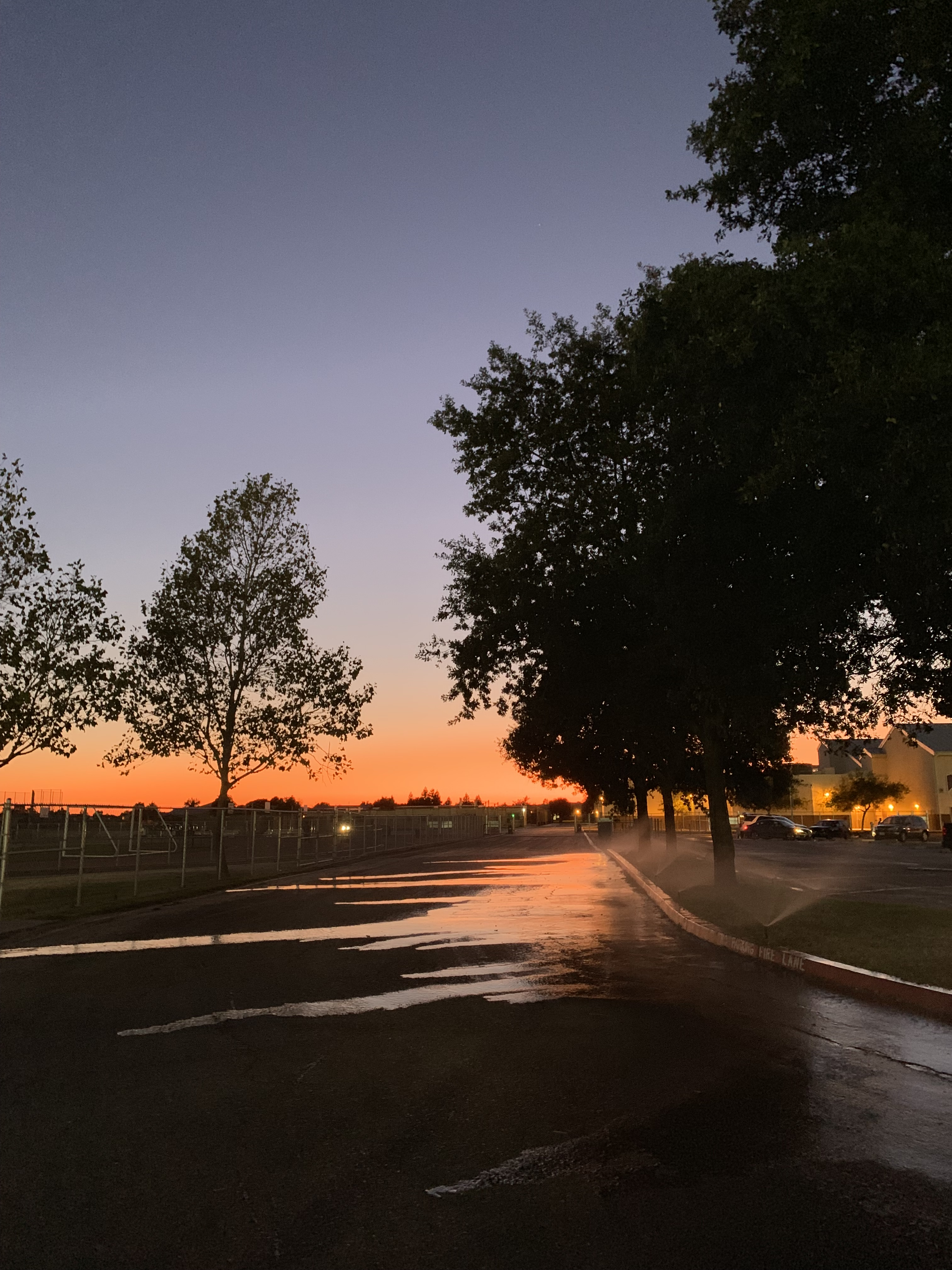
Franklin High School

- Elk Grove High School (est. 1893) (Stadium)
- Valley High School (est. 1977)
- Florin High School (est. 1989)
- Laguna Creek High School (est. 1994)
- Sheldon High School (est. 1997) (On Campus Performing Arts Center/Stadium)
- Franklin High School (est. 2002)
- Monterey Trail High School (est. 2004) ((On Campus Performing Arts Center/Stadium))
- Pleasant Grove High School (est. 2005)
- Cosumnes Oaks High School (est. 2008) (On Campus Performing Arts Center/Stadium)

=== Middle schools ===
In parentheses is the high school students will attend.

- Joseph Kerr Middle School (est. 1964) (Elk Grove High School)
- James Rutter Middle School (est. 1966) (Florin High School)
- Samuel Jackman Middle School (est. 1991) (Valley High School)
- Harriet Eddy Middle School (est. 1994) (Laguna Creek High School)
- T.R. Smedberg Middle School (est. 1997) (Sheldon High School)
- Toby Johnson Middle School (est. 2002) (Franklin High School)
- Edward Harris Jr. Middle School (est. 2004) (Monterey Trail High School)
- Katherine L. Albiani Middle School (est. 2005) (Pleasant Grove High School)
- Elizabeth Pinkerton Middle School (est. 2008) (Cosumnes Oaks High School)

=== Elementary schools ===
- Florin Elementary School (est. 1887)
- Cosumnes River Elementary School (est. 1948)
- Elk Grove Elementary School (established in 1948, re-established in 1993)
- EGES - major fire at original historical campus location 2015
- Pleasant Grove Elementary School (est. 1950)
- C.W. Dillard Elementary School (est. 1955)
- Franklin Elementary School (est. 1955)
- Sierra Enterprise Elementary School (est. 1955)
- Anna Kirchgater Elementary School (est. 1957)
- James A. McKee Elementary School (est. 1963)
- Samuel Kennedy Elementary School (est. 1963)
- David Reese Elementary School (est. 1965)
- Charles E. Mack Elementary School (est. 1966)
- Herman Leimbach Elementary School (est. 1972)
- Florence Markofer Elementary School (est. 1980)
- Ellen Feickert Elementary School (est. 1981)
- Prairie Elementary School (est. 1981)
- Isabelle Jackson Elementary School (est. 1988)
- Union House Elementary School (est. 1988)
- John Reith Elementary School (est. 1989)
- John Ehrhardt Elementary School (est. 1991)
- Mary Tsukamoto Elementary School (est. 1992)
- Foulks Ranch Elementary School (est. 1993)
- Elitha Donner Elementary School (est. 1994)
- Barbara Comstock Morse Elementary School (est. 1995)
- Maeola R. Beitzel Elementary School (est. 1996)
- Arthur C. Butler Elementary School (est. 1998)
- Joseph Sims Elementary School (est. 1999)
- Raymond Case Elementary School (est. 2000
- Stone Lake Elementary School (est. 2000)
- Elliott Ranch Elementary School (est. 2002)
- Irene B. West Elementary School (est. 2002)
- Robert J. Fite Elementary School (est. 2002)
- Edna Batey Elementary School (est. 2003)
- Arlene Hein Elementary School (est. 2004)
- Roy Herburger Elementary School (est. 2004)
- Arnold Adreani Elementary School (est. 2005)
- Helen Carr Castello Elementary School (est. 2005)
- Carroll Elementary (est. 2006)
- Sunrise Elementary School (est. 2007)
- Marion Mix Elementary School (est. 2015)
- Robert J. McGarvey Elementary School (est. 2017)
- Zehnder Ranch Elementary School (est. 2017)
- Miwok Village Elementary School (est. 2022)
- Cypress Grove Elementary School (est. 2026)

=== Continuation schools ===
- William Daylor High School (est. 1966) college-preparatory
- Rio Cazadero High School (est. 1981)
- Calvine High School (est. 1991)

=== Alternative schools ===
- Las Flores High School (est. 1988), a charter school
- Elk Grove Charter School (est. 1999)
- Elk Grove Unified School District Virtual Academy (est. 2010), an online school

== See also ==
- Elk Grove Unified School District v. Newdow, a lawsuit in which a schoolchild's father argued that the "under God" portion of the Pledge of Allegiance was unconstitutional.
- Contraction of COVID-19 within EGUSD family causes 1 week shut down.
