= Florin High School =

Public school in California, United States

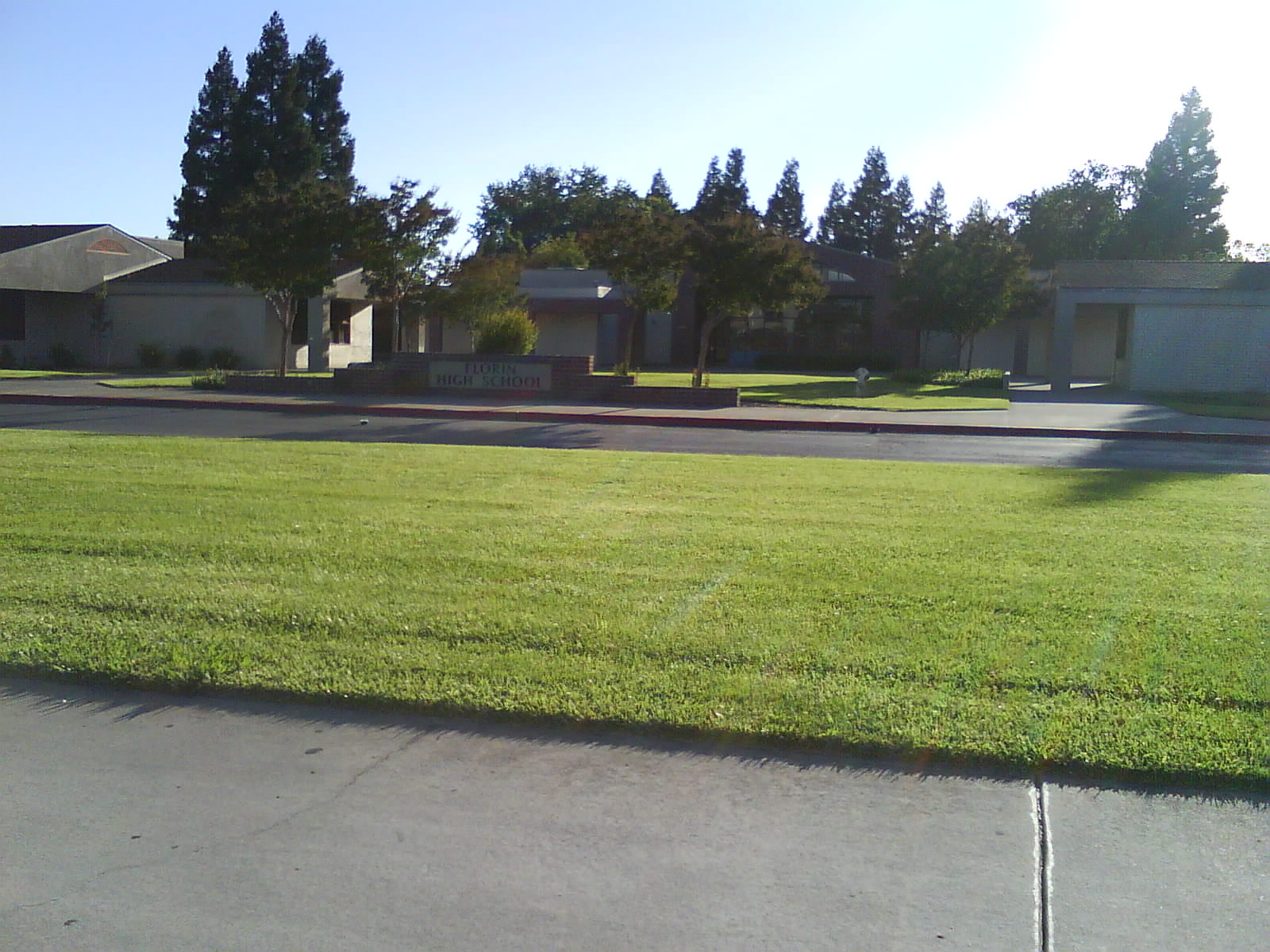

Location
- 7956 Cottonwood Lane; Sacramento, CA
- Coordinates: 38.46823°N 121.39126°W

Information
- Type: Public
- Established: 1989
- School district: Elk Grove Unified School District
- Principal: Brie Bajar
- Teaching staff: 86.52 (FTE)
- Enrollment: 1,663 (2023-2024)
- Student to teacher ratio: 19.22
- Colors: Maroon, gold, and black
- Mascot: Panther
- Rival: Monterey Trail High School and Valley High School
- Website: fhs.egusd.net

Florin High School is a high school in Sacramento, California. It is part of the Elk Grove Unified School District and serves the portion of southern Sacramento that is to the east of California State Route 99.

== History ==
Florin High School opened in 1989, the third high school in the district. It has since then remained in continuous operation. The district named Florin High after Florin, a neighborhood in unincorporated Sacramento County, California that used to be a farming community growing primarily strawberries until a combination of the Japanese American Internment and land development replaced the strawberry fields with suburban tracts.

== Architecture ==
Florin High School's architecture adopts the University of Virginia's "academical village" building plan. This plan anchors the school on the library. Two parallel rows of classrooms run down from behind the library with a manicured lawn in between the two rows. Other permanent classrooms exist as contemporaries to the anchor architecture plan. Since the school's inception, the Elk Grove Unified School District has added a number of other permanent and temporary classrooms.

== Notable alumni ==
- Ephraim Salaam, offensive lineman in the NFL, played for Atlanta Falcons and Denver Broncos.
