= Sheldon High School (California) =

Public high school in Sacramento County, California

Location
- 8333 Kingsbridge Drive; Sacramento, California 95829; United States; 38°27′19″N 121°20′53″W

Information
- School type: Public, suburban, large
- Motto: “Every Day is a Great Day to Be a Husky!”
- Established: 1997
- Status: Open
- School district: Elk Grove Unified School District
- Principal: Leticia Bucio
- Teaching staff: 106.24 (FTE)
- Grades: 9-12
- Gender: Co-ed
- Enrollment: 2,368 (2024-2025)
- Average class size: 21
- Student to teacher ratio: 22.29
- Colors: Teal, White, Black
- Athletics conference: CIF Sac-Joaquin Section
- Nickname: Huskies
- Rival: Pleasant Grove High School (California) & Monterey Trail High School
- Feeder schools: T.R. Smedberg Middle School
- Affiliation: None
- Website: shs.egusd.net
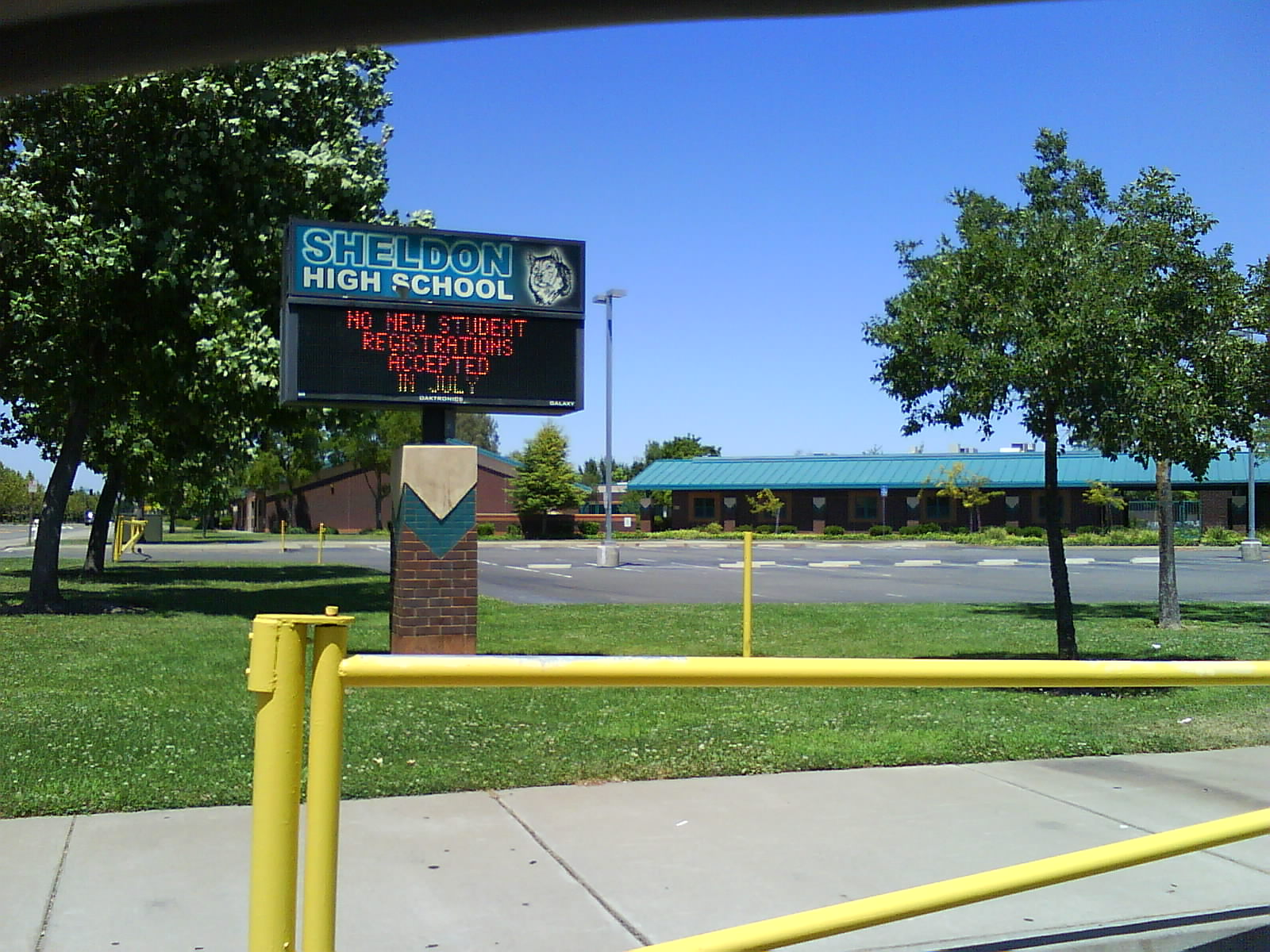

Sheldon High School or SHS is a 9th–12th grade college-preparatory high school located in unincorporated Vineyard, California, a southeast suburb of Sacramento that is also north of Elk Grove. The school was established in 1997 as part of the Elk Grove Unified School District.

== Athletics ==
Sheldon High School has won 17 CIF Sac-Joaquin Section Division 1 championships including in softball, boys' basketball, and girls' basketball.

=== Teams ===
- Baseball (men's)
- Basketball
- Cheerleading (women's)
- Cross Country
- Football (men's)
- Golf
- Softball (women's)
- Soccer
- Swimming
- Tennis
- Track and Field
- Volleyball
- Wrestling

== Academies & Pathways ==
Sheldon High School offers several academies that are designed to prepare students post secondary school in specific career pathways.

=== ARTSwork ===
The ARTSwork Academy provides students with an expansion in visual and performing arts activities including dance, theatre, music, and visual arts. The four year program maintains partnerships with regional arts and higher-education institutions including with the Crocker Art Museum, Sacramento State, Sacramento City College, Cosumnes River College, Academy of Art University, and California Music Theatre.

=== Biotech Academy (BTA) ===
The Biotech Academy is a four year health and medical centered program. The program provides courses revolving to biotechnology, microbiology and bioinformatics, and molecular biotechnology. BTA has partnerships with schools and organizations including UC Davis, Vitalant, Sacramento State, American River College, Dignity Health, and Methodist Hospital.

=== Building Trades ===
The Building Trade pathway is designed for students looking for skills relating to the architecture and construction industry. Advanced courses allow students to specialize in specific building and engineering pathways. The program is three years long course and has business and community partners including Granite Construction.

=== Agriculture/FFA Program ===
The Sheldon Agriculture academy focuses on hands on science courses relating to plants, animals, and the environment. The academy is affiliated with the National FFA Organization, giving students access to Supervised Agriculture Experiences (SAEs) and regional and state FFA competitions.

=== C.O.D.E ===
C.O.D.E is a three year program which explores computer sciences and principles as well database design and SQL programming. The academy has community partners with Folsom Lake College and the Apple Volt Program.

== Notable alumni ==
- Klayton Adams - football coach
- Dakarai Allen - professional basketball player
- Marcus Bagley - basketball player
- Alex Cook - professional American football player
- David Garibaldi - performance painter and artist
- Jolene Henderson - professional softball pitcher
- Darin Johnson - professional basketball player
- Taron Johnson - professional football player
- Chris Kelly - screenwriter and director
- Austin Madison - animator and artist
- Matt Manning - baseball pitcher
- Victoria Monét - singer and songwriter
- DeMarcus Nelson - professional basketball player
- Keith Powers - professional actor
- Trent Redden - basketball executive
- Ben Underwood - human echolocator
