= Chester Pitts =

American football player (born 1979)

No. 69
- Positions: Guard, tackle

Personal information
- Born: June 26, 1979 (age 47); Inglewood, California, U.S.
- Listed height: 6 ft 5 in (1.96 m)
- Listed weight: 295 lb (134 kg)

Career information
- High school: California Academy of Mathematics and Science (Carson, California)
- College: San Diego State
- NFL draft: 2002: 2nd round, 50th overall pick

Career history
- Houston Texans (2002–2009); Seattle Seahawks (2010)

Career NFL statistics
- Games played: 121
- Games started: 119
- Fumble recoveries: 6
- Stats at Pro Football Reference

Chester Morise Pitts II (born June 26, 1979) is an American former professional football player who was an offensive guard in the National Football League (NFL). He played college football for the San Diego State Aztecs and was selected by the Houston Texans in the second round of the 2002 NFL draft. He played in the NFL from 2002 through 2011. Pitts was the focus of the NFL SuperAd commercial shown during Super Bowl XLII relating the story of how his career began.

== Early life ==
Pitts attended the California Academy of Mathematics and Science in Carson, California. His school did not have a football program, so he competed in shot put and discus on the track and field team and won All-League honors and set several school records.

== College career ==
Pitts attended San Diego State University, and he worked bagging groceries at a Ralphs supermarket. After a chance encounter with Ephraim Salaam, Pitts joined the Aztecs as a freshman walk-on. Upon dominating future Pro-Bowler Kabeer Gbaja-Biamila in practice he was awarded a scholarship. As a sophomore, he saw action in nine games and graded out at 97% for blocking consistency, made 60 knockdown blocks, and allowed only 1 sack throughout his sophomore season. He started for two seasons before being drafted by the Houston Texans in the second round, 50th overall pick.

== Professional career ==
=== Houston Texans ===
Pitts was selected in the second round of the 2002 NFL draft by the Houston Texans. He started every game during his first eight seasons with the Texans, either at left guard or left tackle. During his last season with the team in 2009, Pitts only played in two games, both of which he started. In his last game that season, Pitts injured his right knee, ending his season and later requiring microfracture surgery.

=== Seattle Seahawks ===
Pitts signed with the Seattle Seahawks as a free agent before the start of the 2010 NFL season, but was not able to recover enough from his off-season surgery to play in the season opener. Pitts appeared in 7 games, starting 5 of them and made the playoffs for the first time. He became a free agent after the 2010 season.

On April 27, 2021, Pitts signed a one-day contract with Houston, officially retiring with the franchise after over a decade.

== In popular culture ==
During Super Bowl XLII, the NFL aired a commercial starring Pitts and Texans teammate Ephraim Salaam. In it, Pitts and Salaam reminisce about Salaam discovering Pitts, "this big guy," bagging groceries at a store near San Diego State University, which they both attended. Pitts, a devoted oboist who had never played organized football, was convinced by Salaam to join the school's football team and performed so well that he would be drafted by the Houston Texans in the second round of the 2002 NFL draft, while Salaam was drafted by the Atlanta Falcons in the seventh round in the 1998 NFL draft. The music during the commercial, featuring the oboe, of Bach's Brandenburg Concerto No. 2, was played by Pitts.

== Television career ==
In November 2012, Pitts began a role as a sportscaster for KPRC, News 2 Houston in Houston, Texas. In 2013, Pitts participated in the 23rd season of The Amazing Race with former teammate Ephraim Salaam. After encountering several travel delays on their way from Santiago to Lisbon, they finished in 9th Place out of 11 teams and were the third team eliminated from the race upon arrival when host Phil Keoghan arrived at Lisbon Airport, as all of the other teams in the race had already finished all of the tasks and then checked in at the Pit Stop before they even made it to Portugal. Moreover, they become the first team ever in Amazing Race history to be eliminated at the airport.
