= Andy Fox =

American baseball player and coach (born 1971)

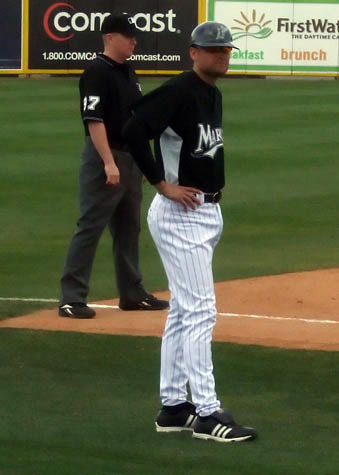
- Fox with the Marlins
- Utility player / Coach
- Born: January 12, 1971 (age 55); Sacramento, California, U.S.
- Batted: Left Threw: Right

MLB debut
- April 7, 1996, for the New York Yankees

Last MLB appearance
- October 3, 2004, for the Texas Rangers

MLB statistics
- Batting average: .239
- Home runs: 30
- Runs batted in: 168
- Stats at Baseball Reference

Teams
- As player: New York Yankees (1996–1997); Arizona Diamondbacks (1998–2000); Florida Marlins (2000–2003); Montreal Expos (2004); Texas Rangers (2004); As coach: Florida Marlins (2007–2009); Boston Red Sox (2022–2024)

Career highlights and awards
- 2× World Series champion (1996, 2003)

Andrew Junipero Fox (born January 12, 1971) is an American former professional baseball coach and infielder. Fox played in Major League Baseball (MLB) from 1996 to 2004 for the New York Yankees, Arizona Diamondbacks, Florida Marlins, Montreal Expos, and Texas Rangers. He was a member of the 1996 World Series and 2003 World Series champions. Fox coached the Marlins from 2007 to 2009; he joined the Boston Red Sox staff in 2011, and was a coach for the team during 2022–2024.

== Playing career ==
Fox graduated from Christian Brothers High School in Sacramento, California. The New York Yankees selected Fox in the second round, with the 45th overall selection, of the 1989 MLB draft. After he played in the minor leagues for the Yankees through the 1995 season, Fox made the Yankees' Opening Day roster in 1996 as a utility player. Fox batted .196 in 189 at bats for the Yankees in 1996, often playing as a substitute late in games as the Yankees won the 1996 World Series.

Before the 1998 season, the Yankees traded Fox to the Arizona Diamondbacks for Todd Erdos and Marty Janzen. While with the Diamondbacks, he set the team's single season record for times hit by pitch. On June 9, 2000, the Diamondbacks traded Fox to the Florida Marlins for Danny Bautista. Fox was a member of the 2003 World Series champions.

After the 2003 season, Fox signed a minor league contract with the Texas Rangers. The Montreal Expos selected Fox in the Rule 5 draft. The Expos released him in July and he signed with the Rangers.

== Coaching/managing career ==
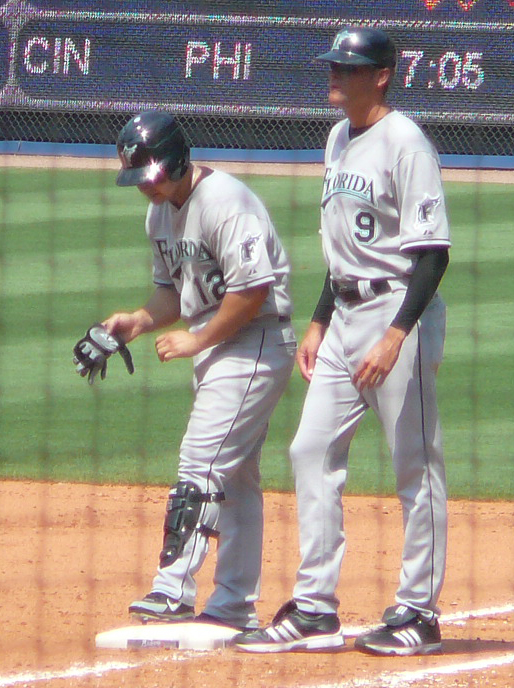
Fox (right) with Marlins outfielder Cody Ross in 2008

After his playing career ended, Fox became a minor league coach in the Texas Rangers' farm system in 2005 and served as manager of the Single-A Clinton LumberKings in 2006.

On March 24, 2007, Fox replaced Perry Hill as the Florida Marlins' first base and infield coach. Fox had previously played under Hill in 2002; similarly, former Marlins manager Fredi Gonzalez was a coach for the Marlins during part of Fox's playing career with the team. After the 2009 season, Fox was named the hitting coach of the Double-A West Tenn Diamond Jaxx of the Southern League.

Fox was named minor-league infield coordinator by the Boston Red Sox for the 2011 season. He still held that position as of the 2019 season, while adding the new responsibilities of assistant field coordinator for Boston's player development organization.

In December 2021, Fox was named to Boston's major-league coaching staff, in the role of field coordinator. In January 2024, Fox was promoted to first base coach for the Red Sox. On October 9, 2024, it was announced that Fox would not be retained on Boston's coaching staff.

On January 31, 2025, the Pittsburgh Pirates hired Fox to serve as the manager of their Double-A affiliate, the Altoona Curve.

== See also ==
- List of people from Sacramento, California
- Rule 5 draft results

Sporting positions
Preceded by Kyle Hudson	Boston Red Sox first base coach 2024	Succeeded by José David Flores
