= Elk Grove Charter School =

Location
- 10065 Atkins Drive; Elk Grove, Sacramento County, California 95757; United States; 38.392818°N 121.43019°W

Information
- Type: Charter
- Opened: 1999
- School district: Elk Grove Unified School District
- Administrator: Marc LaVine
- Teaching staff: 13.34 (on an FTE basis)
- Grades: 7–12
- Enrollment: 295 (2022–23)
- Student to teacher ratio: 22.11
- Color
- Team name: Falcons
- Website: egca.egusd.net

Elk Grove Charter School is a charter school located in Elk Grove, California, United States. It is officially accredited by the Western Association of Schools and Colleges (WASC). The school serves students in the 7th-12th grades in the Elk Grove Unified School District and five counties that touch Sacramento County.
