= Bob Emmett Fletcher =

American agricultural inspector (1911-2013)

Bob Fletcher
- Born: Robert Emmett Fletcher Jr. July 26, 1911; San Francisco, California U.S.
- Died: May 23, 2013 (aged 101); Sacramento, California U.S.
- Other name: Bob Fletcher
- Education: University of California, Davis
- Occupation: Farmer
- Years active: 1942–1945
- Notable work: Assisted interned Japanese during World War II

Robert Emmett Fletcher Jr. (July 26, 1911 – May 23, 2013) was an American agricultural inspector who quit his job to care for the fruit farms of Japanese families during World War II, after many Japanese Americans were forcibly sent to concentration camps as a result of Executive Order 9066.

== Early life ==
Fletcher was born on July 26, 1911, in San Francisco, California. In 1929, he graduated from high school in Brentwood, where he had grown up. In 1933, he graduated from University of California, Davis, with a degree in agriculture. During World War II, he married Teresa Cassieri, and they had a son, Robert Fletcher III. After the war, the family purchased land in Florin and raised cattle.

== Career ==
After college, Fletcher ran a peach orchard in Red Bluff, California, and then became a state shipping point inspector (agriculture inspector). Starting in 1942, Fletcher began working for the Florin Fire Department. That same year, Fletcher agreed to manage 90 acres of grapes for Japanese-American citizens who had been relocated as a result of Executive Order 9066. The grape farms were located in Florin. Fletcher claimed to have been harassed by his own community, and he also found bullet holes in his barn. He used the proceeds from farming the land to pay the taxes for the interned Japanese-Americans. From 1942 to 1945, he managed the Tsukamoto, Nitta, and Okamoto farms. Fletcher's wife Teresa Cassieri also worked the farms. Fletcher kept half the net profits after paying mortgages and taxes on the farms, and returned the remaining net profits to the Japanese-American farmers when they were released.

== Later life and death ==
After World War II, in 1953, Fletcher helped create the Florin Fire Protection District where he served as chief. In 1959, he helped found the Florin County Water District to protect the local water rights. In 1985, he helped create the Florin Historical Society, and served as both president and board member.

Fletcher retired from the Florin Fire Department in 1974, as the paid chief. In 2005, he spoke about Japanese American Internment before the Lodi Historical Society in Lodi, California. Fletcher donated five acres of his land to the town of Florin, where the Fletcher Farm Community Center was built. In 2011, he was given a birthday bash, and honored for his heroism and his story was being told in books.

Fletcher died on May 23, 2013, in Sacramento. He did not get recognition for his efforts until later in life. Most of the interned Japanese Americans lost everything during the war.
