= Valley High School (Sacramento, California) =

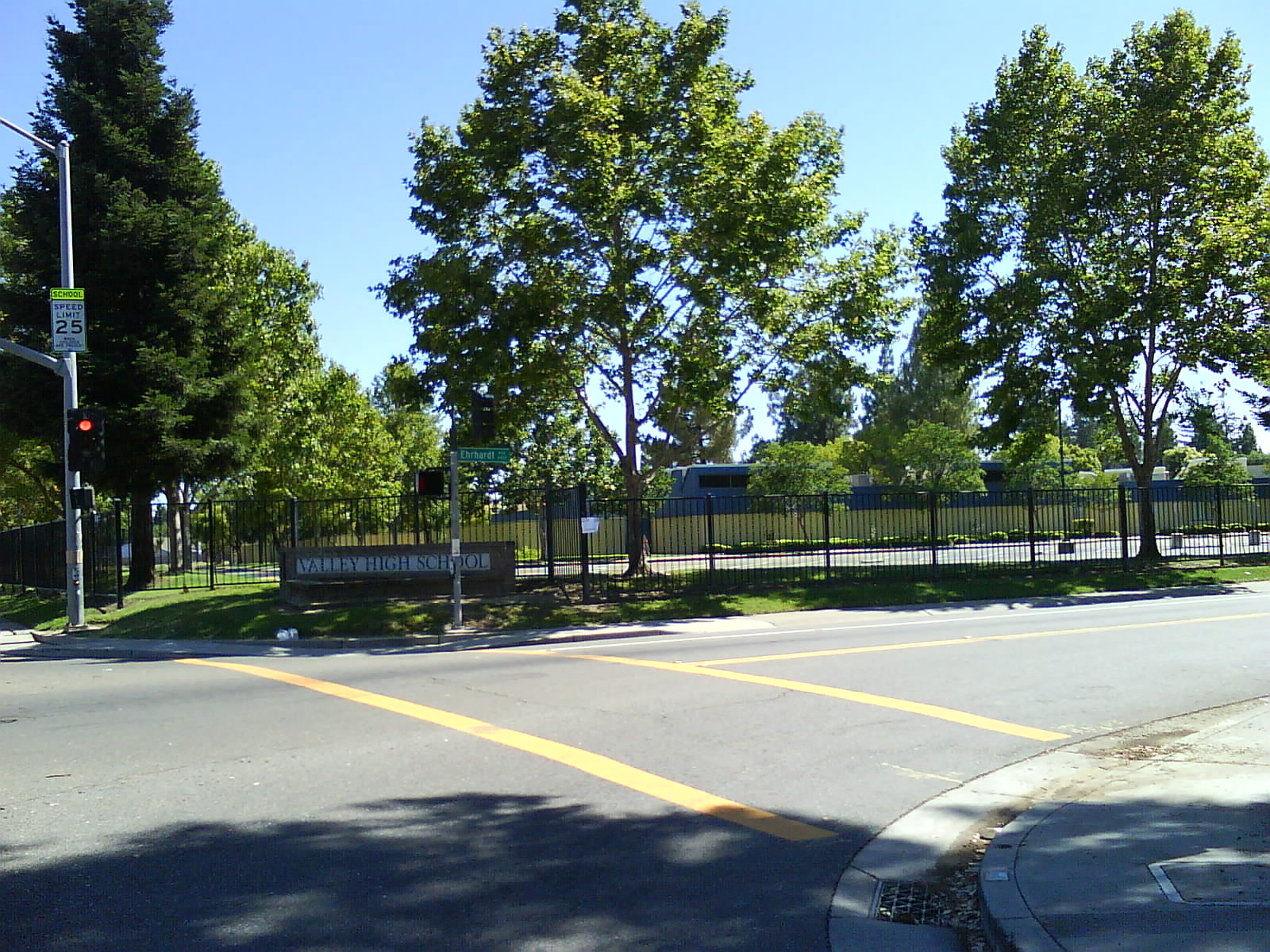

Location
- 6300 Ehrhardt Ave; Sacramento, Sacramento County, California 95823; United States of America; 38.45369°N 121.42849°W

Information
- School type: Public
- Established: 1977
- School district: Elk Grove Unified School District
- Principal: Bridgette Kemp-Bell
- Hours in school day: 7
- Colours: Blue, white, and gray
- Slogan: “Scholarship, Integrity, and Perseverance!”
- Fight song: "Everywhere we go, People wanna know, who we are, so we tell them, we are the vikings, the mighty mighty vikings."
- Sports: Soccer league champs 2020-21 Class of 2021 Footworks Dance Company Varsity Cheer
- Mascot: Viktor the Viking
- Rival: Elk Grove High School; Florin High School; Burbank High School
- Feeder schools: Samuel Jackman Middle School
- Website: Official website

Valley High School is a 9th-12th-grade college preparatory high school located in Sacramento, California, near the city limits of Elk Grove, California. The school was established in 1977 as part of the Elk Grove Unified School District. Valley's mascot is the Viking and their cross town rivals are Elk Grove High School and Florin High School.

== History ==
Valley was Elk Grove's second comprehensive and traditional high school. The new school was built to serve the northern part of the huge 320-square-mile (830 km^{2}) district, which covered a large portion of south Sacramento. The name chosen for the high school was intended to reflect the Valley Hi community, which was then one of the newer subdivisions in the south area.

== Academics ==
The school has increased the number of students completing A-G requirements from 21 percent in 2005 to 30 percent in 2007. The number of Valley High School students who successfully completed CSU applications rose by 56 percent from 2005 to 2007. The number of students taking the PSAT rose from a 4 percent participation rate in 2005–2006 to 80 percent in 2007–2008. During the same time period, the EGUSD participation rate rose from 16 percent to 79 percent in 2007–2008. The numbers of students participating are now far higher than the state level at 34 percent and the nation at 37 percent.

In 2013, the Health TECH Academy launched the state's first high school-based community health worker training program. Health TECH chw trainees participate in various community events and serve as paid interns with health providers.

=== Academic competitions ===
==== National History Day ====
In the National History Day program, participants from Valley High have reached the national finals a number of times. In 1997, a student won second place in the Senior Individual Exhibit category. In 1998, a group won third in the Senior Group Exhibit, and one student won third in Senior Individual Exhibit. In 2007, three students won second place in the Senior Group Exhibit category.

== Notable alumni ==
=== Athletics ===
- Robert Awalt - NFL, tight end
- Rae Carruth - NFL, wide receiver. convicted murderer
- Jerry DeLoach - NFL, defensive tackle
- Keith Lewis - NFL, safety
- Charles Mann - NFL, defensive tackle Super Bowl Champion
- Jamie Nieto - 3-time Olympic high jumper
- Jeremiah Pharms - college football player
- Marshall Sperbeck - football coach
- Fernando Viña - MLB, infielder
- Damen Wheeler - American football player

=== Politics ===
- George A. Plescia - State Assemblyman, former Republican leader
