= Ephraim Salaam =

American football player (born 1976)

No. 74, 76, 66
- Position: Offensive tackle

Personal information
- Born: June 19, 1976 (age 50); Chicago, Illinois, U.S.
- Listed height: 6 ft 7 in (2.01 m)
- Listed weight: 310 lb (141 kg)

Career information
- High school: Florin (Sacramento, California)
- College: San Diego State
- NFL draft: 1998: 7th round, 199th overall pick

Career history
- Atlanta Falcons (1998–2001); Denver Broncos (2002–2003); Jacksonville Jaguars (2004–2005); Houston Texans (2006–2008); Detroit Lions (2009); Houston Texans (2009–2010)

Career NFL statistics
- Games played: 163
- Games started: 129
- Fumble recoveries: 2
- Stats at Pro Football Reference

Ephraim Mateen Salaam (born June 19, 1976) is an American former professional football player who was an offensive tackle in the National Football League (NFL). He was selected by the Atlanta Falcons in the seventh round of the 1998 NFL draft. He played college football for the San Diego State Aztecs.

Salaam played for the Atlanta Falcons, Denver Broncos, Jacksonville Jaguars, Detroit Lions, and Houston Texans.

== Early life ==
Salaam played high school football at Florin High School in Sacramento, California. He also was starred on the basketball team averaging 24 points and 12 rebounds a game his senior year. Earning all league honors as well as being named a Nike All American.

== College career ==
Salaam became a three-year starter as both a right and left tackle at San Diego State University, where he played in 31 career games. He also played on the basketball team.

== Professional career ==
Salaam was selected by the Atlanta Falcons in the seventh round (199th overall) of the 1998 NFL draft. The Falcons went 14-2 during Salaam's rookie season, and won the NFC Championship to earn their first ever trip to the Super Bowl. Salaam started at right tackle in the Falcons' defeat to the Denver Broncos in Super Bowl XXXIII. Salaam was the 4th rookie in NFL history to start all 19 games including the Super Bowl. He also was the youngest player to start a Super Bowl at the age of 22.

Salaam played a total of 13 NFL seasons for five NFL teams, including the Atlanta Falcons, Denver Broncos, Jacksonville Jaguars, Houston Texans, and Detroit Lions.

=== Basketball ===
On October 31, 2013, Salaam was invited to the Texas Legends 2013 training camp. However, he was later waived on November 17.

== Personal life ==
Salaam appeared in an ad with Texans teammate Chester Pitts during Super Bowl XLII. In the commercial, he narrates a story regarding him and Pitts while he attended San Diego State University. When at a local grocery store, Salaam said he saw Pitts bagging groceries, was impressed by his size, and convinced him to try out as a walk-on for the San Diego State Aztecs football team. The commercial goes on to show that Pitts was a second-round pick while Salaam was a seventh-round pick.

On February 10, 2013, Salaam was interviewed by United States Secretary of State Hillary Clinton at the United States Department of State. The event was put on to honor a multitude of Muslim athletes.

On January 24, 2013, Salaam revealed on a Grantland podcast that he is the nephew of Bob McAdoo.

Salaam became an analyst on Fox Sports 1 in 2013.

== Movie career ==
Deon Taylor cast him in 2009 for his new film project Dark Christmas, which is part of the Nite Tales series.

Salaam has served as a producer on two separate TV shows, Dead Tone (2007) and Supremacy (2012).

== Television career ==
In 2013, Salaam participated in the 23rd season of The Amazing Race with former teammate Chester Pitts. After encountering several travel delays on their way from Santiago to Lisbon, they finished in 9th Place out of 11 teams and were the third team eliminated from the race upon arrival when host Phil Keoghan arrived at Lisbon Airport, as all of the other teams in the race had already finished all of the tasks and then checked in at the Pit Stop before they even made it to Portugal. Moreover, they become the first team ever in Amazing Race history to be eliminated at the airport. Ephraim transitioned from the field to in front of the cameras as a host for multiple TV and radio stations.

In October 2023 Salaam participated in the CBS game show Raid the Cage.
