= Charles Mann (American football) =

American football player (born 1961)

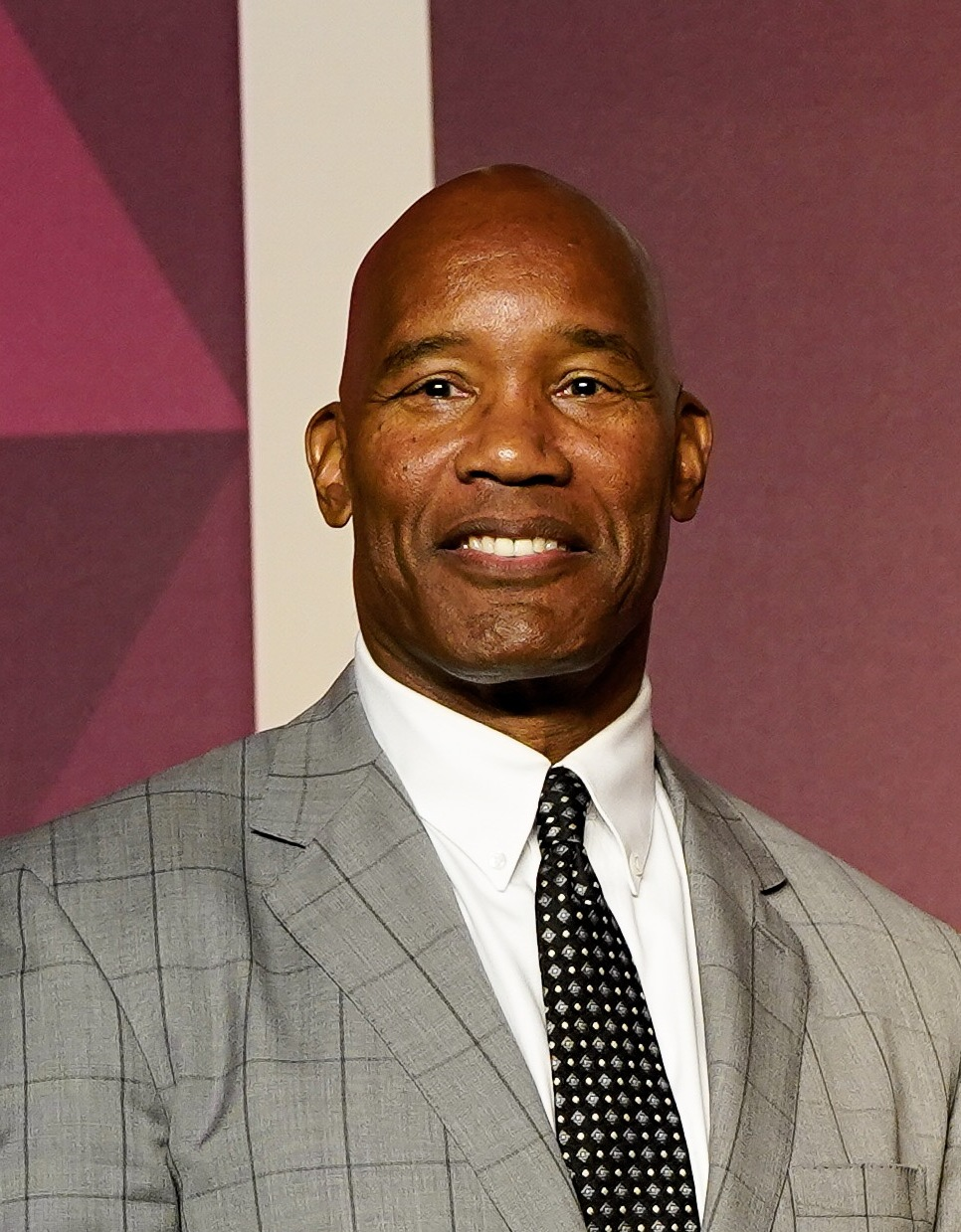
- Mann in 2019

No. 71
- Position: Defensive end

Personal information
- Born: April 12, 1961 (age 65); Sacramento, California, U.S.
- Listed height: 6 ft 6 in (1.98 m)
- Listed weight: 250 lb (113 kg)

Career information
- High school: Valley (Sacramento)
- College: Nevada
- NFL draft: 1983: 3rd round, 84th overall pick

Career history
- Washington Redskins (1983–1993); San Francisco 49ers (1994)

Awards and highlights
- 3× Super Bowl champion (XXII, XXVI, XXIX); 2× Second-team All-Pro (1987, 1991); 4× Pro Bowl (1987–1989, 1991); 80 Greatest Redskins; Washington Commanders Ring of Fame; Nevada Athletics Hall of Fame

Career NFL statistics
- Sacks: 83
- Games: 177
- Safeties: 1
- Stats at Pro Football Reference

Charles Andre Mann (born April 12, 1961) is an American businessman and former professional football player. He played as a defensive end in the National Football League (NFL) for the Washington Redskins and San Francisco 49ers. Mann made the Pro Bowl four times in 1987, 1988, 1989, 1991.

== Early life ==
Mann was born in Sacramento, California and attended Valley High School.

== College career ==
Mann attended and played college football at the University of Nevada, where he played defensive end from 1979 to 1982. During his senior season, he led the Big Sky Conference with 14 sacks and was named the conference's Most Valuable Defensive Lineman. In 2015, he earned his bachelor's degree in business administration from Strayer University. Two years later on June 24, 2017, he received an MBA from Strayer University.

== Professional career ==
Mann was drafted in the third round of the 1983 NFL draft by the Washington Redskins and by his second season, he was the starting left defensive end, opposite to Dexter Manley. During this time, Mann had double-digit sack seasons four times, including a career-high 14.5 in 1985, which was just his third season in the NFL.

Mann finished his career with the Redskins with 82 sacks, second-most in franchise history, and 17 forced fumbles, the most in franchise history, and also won Super Bowl XXII and Super Bowl XXVI. He was released by the Redskins and signed as a free agent with the San Francisco 49ers in 1994, where he won another Super Bowl (Super Bowl XXIX) before retiring.

== After football ==
Mann helped found the Good Samaritan Foundation with his Washington teammates Art Monk, Tim Johnson and Earnest Byner. The foundation provides youth with the environment needed to equip them with the skills, training and resources necessary to compete successfully in society through the Student Training Opportunity Program (STOP). The program serves more than 50 high school students, four days a week during the school year and five days a week during the summer providing after-school programs, tutoring and mentoring.

In 1993, Mann was voted the "Washingtonian of the Year." Among his many accomplishments, Mann serves as a member of the board of Inova Health Systems and as Chairman of the Inova Alexandria Hospital Quality Committee, the board of the McLean School and a Deacon with Grace Covenant Church in Chantilly, Virginia. He also serves on the Honorary Board of Directors for Easter Seals Serving DC|MD|VA, located in Silver Spring, MD.

Prior to starting his own company, Mann was aligned with local and national media entities: ESPN, BET, WUSA (TV) and WJFK-FM as Color Analyst & Reporter. McDonald's, Diet Coke and Swanson as Spokesman. Mann has been involved with National Kidney Foundation, United Way and the Ronald McDonald House Charities, The Border Babies Foundation, the "Read And Achieve Program," "Why School is Cool" Program, The Metropolitan Boys and Girls Clubs, Children's Hospital, The Children's Cancer Foundation and President Clinton's National Service Initiative Committee. Mann was a color commentator for the NFL on CBS from 1999 to 2000. He is also an advocate of player safety while upholding the intensity of sports, focusing his efforts with an impact sensor device company, Brain Sentry.

Mann acted in the web series Turf Valley.

Mann, his wife of more than 30 years, Tyrena, and their three children, daughter Camille, son Cameron Wesley and daughter Casey live in the Washington area.
