= Rae Carruth =

American football player and convicted felon

- Born: Rae Lamar Wiggins; January 20, 1974 (age 52); Sacramento, California, U.S.
- Other names: Rae Theotis Wiggins; Rae Theotis Carruth; Rae Lamar Carruth; Rae Carruth; Rae Lamar
- Occupation: Former professional football player (1997–99)
- Height: 5 ft 11 in (1.80 m)
- Children: 2
- Parent(s): Theodry Carruth (mother); Samuel Carruth (stepfather); Charles Wiggins (father)
- Status: Released
- Convictions: Conspiracy to commit first degree murder Discharge of a firearm into occupied property Use an instrument to destroy an unborn child
- Penalty: 18 years and 11 months to 24 years and 4 months imprisonment
- Football career

No. 84, 89
- Position: Wide receiver

Personal information
- Listed height: 5 ft 11 in (1.80 m)
- Listed weight: 194 lb (88 kg)

Career information
- High school: Valley (Sacramento, California)
- College: Colorado (1992–1996)
- NFL draft: 1997: 1st round, 27th overall pick

Career history
- Carolina Panthers (1997–1999)

Awards and highlights
- PFWA All-Rookie Team (1997); First-team All-American (1996); First-team All-Big 12 (1996); First-team All-Big Eight (1995)

Career NFL statistics
- Receptions: 62
- Receiving yards: 804
- Receiving touchdowns: 4
- Stats at Pro Football Reference

Rae Theotis Carruth (born Rae Lamar Wiggins; January 20, 1974) is an American former professional football player who was convicted of conspiracy to murder. He played as a wide receiver for the Carolina Panthers of the National Football League (NFL). Carruth played college football for the Colorado Buffaloes, earning first-team All-American honors in 1996. He was selected by the Panthers in the first round of the 1997 NFL draft and spent three seasons with the team.

In 2001, he was found guilty of conspiring to murder his then-girlfriend Cherica Adams, who was pregnant with his child. Including pre-trial confinement, he served 18 years of an 18-to-24-year sentence in the North Carolina state prison system and was released from the Sampson Correctional Institution in Clinton, North Carolina, on October 22, 2018.

== Early life ==
Born and raised in Sacramento, California, Carruth attended Valley High School. He was accepted on a football scholarship to the University of Colorado Boulder, in Boulder, Colorado.

== College career ==
He played four seasons for the Buffaloes and was named a first-team All-American in 1996. His quarterbacks at CU were future pros Koy Detmer and Kordell Stewart. Carruth earned his degree with a double major in English and education. Carruth caught 135 passes for 2,540 yards and 11 touchdowns in his four seasons, with an average of 18.8 yards per catch.

== Professional career ==
Pre-draft measurables
Height	Weight	Arm length	Hand span
5 ft 10 5/8 in (1.79 m)	194 lb (88 kg)	31 1/8 in (0.79 m)	9 1/2 in (0.24 m)

Carruth was a first-round draft pick in the 1997 NFL draft, taken by the Carolina Panthers with the 27th overall selection. He signed a four-year, $3.7 million deal that included a $1.3 million signing bonus.

Carruth had a rookie season in 1997 and started 14 games, during which he caught 44 passes for 545 yards and four touchdown passes, tied for first among rookie receivers. He was named to the all-rookie team at wide receiver.

He broke his right foot in the opening game of 1998, and did not catch another pass that season due to the injury. He ended the year with four catches for 59 yards (all on opening day). He played in the first five games of the 1999 season, with 14 catches for 200 yards, before suffering an ankle injury that sidelined him for several weeks, starting in Week 7.

== Personal life ==
During Carruth's sophomore year at Colorado, his girlfriend, Michelle Wright, gave birth to their son Rae Jr. Wright sued him for child support, and Wright later testified that Carruth agreed to pay $2,700 per month in child support, half of what he was ordered to pay by a judge, and she had accepted on condition that he be a better father.

== Murder of Cherica Adams ==
On November 16, 1999, Cherica Adams, a real estate agent, was shot four times while she sat in her car on a road near Carruth's home in Charlotte, North Carolina. Her assailant was Van Brett Watkins Sr., an associate of Carruth who fired a .357 caliber Charter Arms five times into her vehicle. Adams managed to call 9-1-1, stating that after Carruth stopped his vehicle in front of hers, another vehicle drove alongside her vehicle and its passenger shot her. Carruth then drove away from the scene.

At the time of her death, Adams was Carruth's girlfriend and eight months pregnant with their son. Soon after her admission to the hospital, she fell into a coma. Doctors delivered the baby via emergency caesarean section. Carruth went to the police and posted US$3 million (equivalent to $5.80 million in 2025) bail, on condition that if either Adams or the infant died, he would turn himself in. Adams died on December 14, 1999. The baby, named Chancellor Lee Adams, survived but suffered permanent brain damage and cerebral palsy as a result of being without oxygen for 70 minutes before he was born. Chancellor Lee graduated from Vance High School in 2021 at age 21.

On November 26, 1999, Carruth was arrested on charges of conspiracy to commit first-degree murder, attempted murder, and shooting into an occupied vehicle. He was held in the Charlotte-Mecklenburg jail. Watkins Sr. was arrested later that day on the same charges. On November 29, 1999, Carruth's bail was doubled to $3 million.

While out on bail, Carruth quickly fled after Adams' death, but was captured the next day, on December 15, approximately 25 miles east of Jackson in Western Tennessee. He was found hiding in the trunk of a car outside a motel in Parkers Crossroads. The trunk also contained $3,900 cash, bottles of his urine, extra clothes, candy bars, and a cell phone. The Panthers waived him on December 16, citing a morals clause in his contract, and the NFL suspended him indefinitely on December 17. On December 30, 1999, Judge Yvonnne Mims Evans froze Carruth's assets after a DNA test confirmed he was father of Adams' son.

Carruth was offered a chance to plead guilty to second-degree murder in exchange for a 30-year sentence. After he rejected the offer, prosecution sought the death penalty. At trial, prosecutors contended that Carruth hired Watkins and others to murder Adams because of her refusal to abort their unborn child. Carruth's lawyer, David Rudolf, claimed that Carruth had been caught up in a drug deal gone bad. They claimed that on the night of the shooting, after Carruth had refused to fund the drug deal, Watkins shot Adams in a sudden rage when she "flipped him off" after he had attempted to ask her about Carruth's whereabouts.

Carruth was found guilty of conspiracy to commit murder, shooting into an occupied vehicle, and using an instrument to destroy an unborn child. He was found not guilty of first-degree murder, sparing him from possible execution. Carruth was sentenced to 18 years and 11 months to 24 years and 4 months in prison.

Watkins was sentenced to prison for a minimum of 40 years, 8 months and a maximum of 50 years, 8 months for the murder of Cherica Adams. He died at age 63 from natural causes at the Scotland Correctional Institution in Laurinburg, North Carolina on December 3, 2023.

Carruth sent a letter in 2018 apologizing to Saundra Adams, the mother of Cherica Adams, via WBTV in Charlotte, North Carolina, for accusing her of lying about him in interviews for years.

On October 22, 2018, Carruth was released from prison after serving 18 years. He briefly moved to Pennsylvania after his release. He is now married under another name while living in the southwestern United States, and refuses to discuss the events that led to Cherica's death.

== Media ==
The case has been featured in episodes of American Justice, Great Crimes and Trials, Sins and Secrets, and The Killer Speaks. It was also referenced by stand-up comedian Steve Harvey in The Original Kings of Comedy.
