= Damen Wheeler =

American football player (born 1977)

No. 19, 27, 3, 2
- Position: Cornerback

Personal information
- Born: September 3, 1977 (age 49); Sacramento, California, U.S.
- Listed height: 5 ft 9 in (1.75 m)
- Listed weight: 170 lb (77 kg)

Career information
- High school: Valley (Sacramento)
- College: Colorado (1996–1999)
- NFL draft: 2000: 6th round, 203rd overall pick

Career history
- San Diego Chargers (2000)*; Detroit Lions (2000)*; New York/New Jersey Hitmen (2001); St. Louis Rams (2001)*; Jacksonville Jaguars (2001); Los Angeles Avengers (2003–2008)
- * Offseason or practice squad member only

Awards and highlights
- All-XFL (2001); Second-team All-Big 12 (1999)

Career NFL statistics
- Games played: 5
- Tackles: 10
- Stats at Pro Football Reference
- Stats at ArenaFan.com

Damen Keoki Wheeler (born September 3, 1977) is an American former professional football player who was a cornerback for the Jacksonville Jaguars of the National Football League (NFL), the New York/New Jersey Hitmen of the XFL, and the Los Angeles Avengers of the Arena Football League (AFL). He played college football for the Colorado Buffaloes. He was also a member of the San Diego Chargers, Detroit Lions, and St. Louis Rams but did not appear in any games for any of those teams.

== Early life ==
Damen Keoki Wheeler was born on September 3, 1977, in Sacramento, California. He lettered in football, basketball, and track at Valley High School in Sacramento. He rushed 193 times for 2,284 yards and 33 touchdowns his senior year in 1995, garnering all-state and USA Today honorable mention All-USA recognition.

== College career ==
Wheeler played college football for the Colorado Buffaloes from 1996 to 1999 and was a four-year letterman. He started two games his freshman year in 1996, recording two interceptions and six pass breakups on the season. He started all of the team's games in 1997, accumulating 30 tackles, one interception and eight pass breakups while also returning seven punts for 91 yards. Wheeler played in 11 games, starting seven, in 1998 and led the team in defensive snaps played, totaling 45 tackles, one interception, and 17 pass breakups. He recorded 50 tackles, four interceptions, and eight pass breakups his senior season in 1999, and was named second-team All-Big 12 by the coaches. Wheeler set the school record for career pass breakups with 39. He majored in ethnic studies at Colorado.

== Professional career ==
=== Early career ===
Wheeler was selected by the San Diego Chargers in the sixth round, with the 203rd overall pick, of the 2000 NFL draft. He officially signed with the team on July 18. He was waived on July 24, 2000.

Wheeler was signed to the practice squad of the Detroit Lions of the NFL on August 31, 2000. He was waived on September 19, 2000.

In 2001, Wheeler played for the New York/New Jersey Hitmen of the XFL. He started all 10 games for the Hitmen, recording 42 tackles and three interceptions while also earning All-XFL honors.

He then signed with the NFL's St. Louis Rams on May 5, 2001, but was later waived on September 1, 2001.

Wheeler was signed to the practice squad of the Jacksonville Jaguars of the NFL on October 14, 2001. He was promoted to the active roster on December 7 and played in five games during the 2001 season, totaling eight solo tackles and two assisted tackles. He became a free agent after the season, and re-signed with the Jaguars on April 3, 2002. Wheeler was released on September 2, 2002.

=== Los Angeles Avengers ===
Wheeler signed with the Los Angeles Avengers of the Arena Football League (AFL) on December 3, 2002. He played in 15 games, all starts, during the 2003 season, recording 52 solo tackles, 19 assisted tackles, five interceptions, 15 pass breakups, two forced fumbles, two fumbles recoveries and one blocked kick, earning AFL All-Rookie team honors as a defensive specialist. He re-signed with the team on February 2, 2004.

Wheeler appeared in nine games in 2004, accumulating 25 solo tackles, five assisted tackles, four interceptions (one of which was returned for a touchdown), seven pass breakups, and one forced fumble. He also had two stints on injured reserve during the season.

He began the 2005 season on injured reserve and was later activated from injured reserve on February 26 after missing the first four games. He went on to start 12 games in 2005, totaling 48 solo tackles, 15 assisted tackles, four interceptions (one of which was returned for a touchdown), 13 pass breakups, and one forced fumble. Wheeler re-signed with the Avengers on June 30, 2005.

He played in all 16 games during the 2006 season, recording 55 solo tackles, 30 assisted tackles, four interceptions, 14 pass breakups, and seven forced fumbles. Wheeler appeared in 14 games in 2007, accumulating 52 solo tackles, 16 assisted tackles, six interceptions, 18 pass breakups, four forced fumbles, and one fumble recovery.

In 2008, Wheeler totaled 61 solo tackles, 12 assisted tackles, six interceptions, 20 pass breakups, five forced fumbles, and three fumble recoveries. The AFL folded after the 2008 season. He finished his AFL career with totals of 293 solo tackles, 97 assisted tackles, 29 interceptions (two returned for touchdowns), 87 pass breakups, 20 forced fumbles, six fumble recoveries, and one blocked kick.

== Coaching career ==
Wheeler later spent time coaching defensive backs at Sacramento High School and American River College.

== Personal life ==
His son Damen Wheeler Jr. played college football at American River College and Missouri Western.
