= Mary Tsukamoto =

Japanese American educator, cultural historian, and civil rights activist (1915–1998)

- 1944 Mary Tsukamoto with her daughter Marielle. Courtesy of California State University, Sacramento Library
- Born: Mary Tsuruko Dakusaku; January 17, 1915; San Francisco, California, U.S.
- Died: January 6, 1998 (aged 82)
- Education: California State University, Sacramento; College of the Pacific
- Occupations: Educator; cultural historian; civil rights activist
- Employer: Elk Grove Unified School District
- Known for: Time of Remembrance Program, inspired Civil Liberties Act of 1988
- Spouse: Alfred Tsukamoto (m. 1936)
- Children: 1
- Awards: National Women's History Month 2006 honoree

Mary Tsuruko Dakusaku Tsukamoto (January 17, 1915 - January 6, 1998) was a Japanese American educator, cultural historian, and civil rights activist. She had taught in the Elk Grove Unified School District in Sacramento, California, for 26 years, and was described as having a passion to teach children how to learn from experience. The daughter of Japanese parents, she was relocated to an internment camp at Jerome, Arkansas, after the United States entered World War II. She developed a program about the internment period that is part of the California state curriculum for fifth grade history and a California Museum of History tour exhibit. She worked for Japanese American civil liberties, and played a pivotal role in the grassroots effort that led to the Civil Liberties Act of 1988. She also worked with the Smithsonian Institution in Washington DC, where she developed an exhibit on internment for the Constitution's bicentennial. In March 2006, she was posthumously recognized as a National Women's History Month honoree.

== Early life ==
Tsukamoto was born on January 17, 1915, in San Francisco, California. Her parents were from Okinawa, Japan, and she was the second of five children (four girls, one boy). At ten years old, she and her family moved to Florin, California, where they worked on a farm that grew strawberries and grapes, although her parents were not allowed to own land because they were Japanese-born. She attended Florin Grammar School, which was segregated at the time. When she was disqualified from participating in a high school oratorical contest because she was a child of an immigrant, her teacher, Mable Barron, coached her for outside contests, and later helped her gain admission and a scholarship to the College of the Pacific in Stockton, California

== Life in Japanese internment camps ==
In May 1942, as part of the enforcement of Executive Order 9066, Tsukamoto, her husband Al, and daughter Marielle, were sent to the Fresno Assembly Center. She taught the children there at a makeshift summer school, and also taught basic English and public speaking to the adults. In October, they were relocated to an internment camp at Jerome, Arkansas. She said that she was shocked that human beings were fenced in like animals, and that they were no longer free. The National Women's History Project wrote, "the hardship and humiliation of the internment experience fueled much of Mary’s passion for justice as a teacher, community leader, and civil rights activist."

The Tsukamoto family did not lose their grape farm because a local farmer named Bob Fletcher quit his job and managed the Tsukamoto grape farm. He paid the mortgage and the taxes and saved the profits until the Tsukamoto's were released in 1945.

In 1943, Tsukamoto's brother-in-law and husband were permitted to leave the camp to take jobs. Mary and Marielle were released in November 1943, and moved to Kalamazoo, Michigan, to join them. After President Roosevelt lifted the ban on individuals of Japanese ancestry from the West Coast, they returned to their farm in Florin in 1945.

== Dedication to education ==
Tsukamoto was encouraged by Isabell Jackson, the principal of her daughter's school, to pursue a teaching career. She went to Sacramento State to get her teaching credential while working as a substitute teacher. In 1949, She became one of the first certificated Japanese-American teachers by joining Florin Elementary School in the Elk Grove School District as a third grade teacher. She said that in her first year, the children were "climbing out the windows". She taught in the district for 26 years, proving to be a faculty member with a passion for education. After retiring in 1976, she continued working with schools and brought students of all ethnicities together. She directed a Japanese cultural heritage program called Jan Ken Po Gakko, which were similar to the Japanese language schools established before the War. She also organized lectures and displays; in 1994, she helped the California State University at Sacramento create a library collection called The Japanese American Archival Collection (JAAC), where she provided "an initial gift of photographs, documents and artifacts" which has since grown to over 4,000 original items from over 200 donors.

In 1983, Tsukamoto launched the Time of Remembrance program, which was a way to bring Elk Grove students into contact with former internees. The students listened to stories from Japanese Internment camp victims, looked at photographs and artifacts, and learned what it means to be an American citizen. She created this curriculum as a way to shed light on the discrimination that the Japanese endured during World War II, and to enrich their knowledge of American history. Her daughter, Marielle, described this work of her mother's as a way to "tie this story to the Constitution. It’s every citizen’s responsibility to make sure our own civil rights and someone else’s rights are not denied."

== Dedication to civil rights liberties ==
Tsukamoto's growing discontent over the treatment of Japanese Americans in World War II played a major role in her quest for redress. In 1981, she testified in the Congressional hearings by the United States Commission on Wartime Internment and Relocation of Civilians, and, in 1987, she published the book We the People: A Story of Internment in America; its purpose was: "To help ensure that all the citizens of the United States have the opportunity to learn about the Japanese internment experience, as well as the courage, resilience, and patriotism of the people interned." She developed an exhibit on internment at the Smithsonian Institution in Washington D.C for the bicentennial celebration of the U.S. Constitution. Her daughter, Marielle, said that one of her mother's proudest moments came when President Ronald Reagan signed House Resolution 442, the Civil Liberties Act of 1988, where the U.S. government apologized for the internment of Japanese Americans; it stated that the internment was a "grave injustice to both citizens and permanent residents of Japanese ancestry", and granted each detainee US$20,000 for "the incalculable losses in education and job training, all of which resulted in significant human suffering … for these fundamental violations of basic civil liberties and constitutional rights of these individuals" Mary Tsukamoto lived by the motto that "never again" should citizens lose their fundamental rights.

== Legacy ==
In 1992, the Mary Tsukamoto Elementary School which the first school in U.S. history to be named after a Japanese American woman opened in the Elk Grove District in the Vintage Park area of South Sacramento. The school was dedicated "in her honor as a tribute to Mary’s work in establishing cultural and educational programs."

In 2003, her Time of Remembrance Program moved from the Elk Grove district office to the California Museum for History, Women, and the Arts where it shows as a seasonal exhibit tour. In 2006, about 6,500 fifth graders studied her Time of Remembrance curriculum. where workshops and special exhibit tours are held seasonally.

The California State Senate recognized her as a Notable Californian. In March 2006, she was one of ten women recognized as a National Women's History Month honoree.

Her daughter, Marielle Tsukamoto, graduated from The University of the Pacific with a Bachelor of Arts in education; she was a teacher for 25 years, and returned to Elk Grove district as an administrator where she retired in 2001. She continues to carry on Mary's work in internment education, and serves on the board of directors for the National Women's History Project.

== Books ==
- Tsukamoto, Mary; Pinkerton, Elizabeth (1987). We the People: A Story of Internment in America. Laguna Publishers. ISBN 978-0944665411. "reprinted 1988"
- Marzell, Terry Lee (September 28, 2012). Chalkboard Champions: Twelve Remarkable Teachers Who Educated America's Disenfranchised Students. Wheatmark. 280pp. ISBN 9781604948103.
