= Monterey Trail High School =

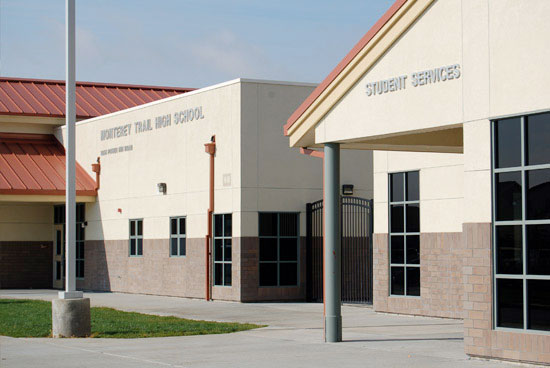

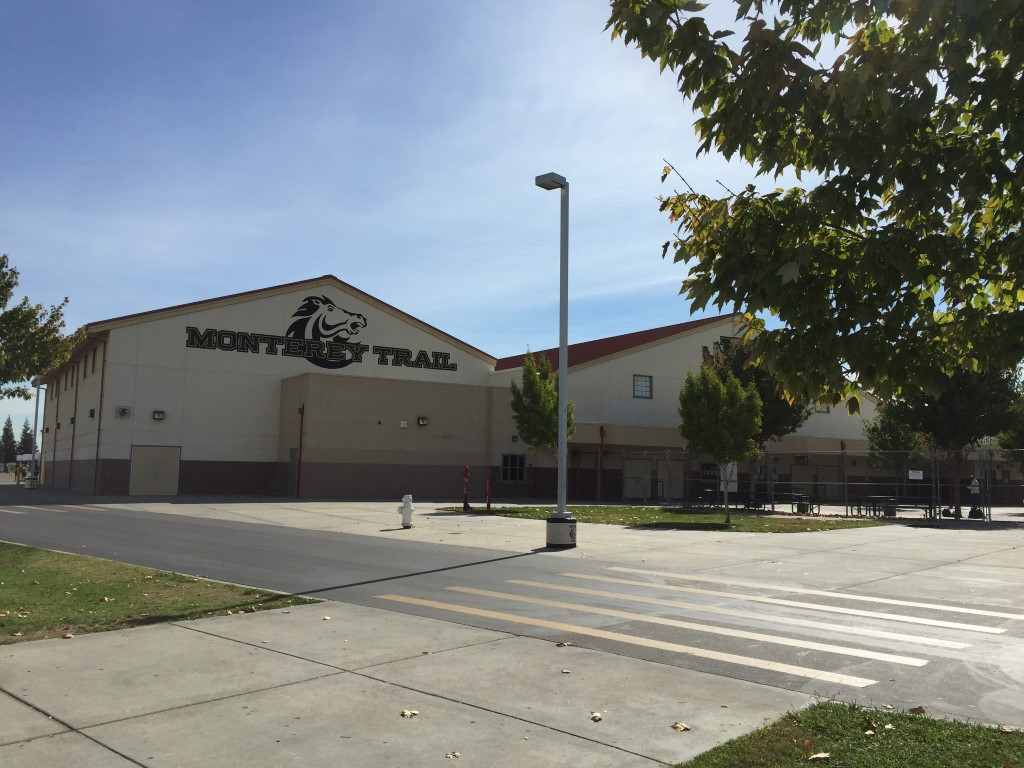

Location
- 8661 Power Inn Road; Elk Grove, California 95624; United States; 38.44941°N 121.39833°W

Information
- Motto: "Building a future, finding a way"
- Established: 2004
- School district: Elk Grove Unified School District
- President: Lara Ricks
- Teaching staff: 102.64 (FTE)
- Enrollment: 2,298 (2023-2024)
- Student to teacher ratio: 22.39
- Color
- Mascot: Mustang
- Team name: Mustangs
- Rival: Sheldon High School & Florin High School
- Feeder schools: Edward Harris Jr. Middle School

Monterey Trail High School (MTHS or MT) is a 9th-12th grade college preparatory high school located in Elk Grove, California. The school was established in 2004 as part of the Elk Grove Unified School District.

== History ==
The school color of forest green is based on the abundant amount of trees along the areas of Elk Grove, Laguna Creek, and Franklin. The second school color of gold is based on the Monterey Trail becoming well-traveled after the discovery of gold. The school mascot, the Mustang, is based on the horses that travelers rode while traveling the Monterey Trail in the 19th century.

The campus football stadium was renamed on October 26, 2007.

== Academics & Pathways ==
Monterey Trail High School uses a block schedule system and is accredited by the Western Association of Schools and Colleges (WASC). The school also offers career academies in the fields such as Design and Technology Academy (DATA), Animation, Business/Entrepreneurial (BOSS), Digital Media, and Medical Assisting.

=== Business/Entrepreneurial Pathway (BOSS) ===
The BOSS pathway offers opportunities regarding to developing entrepreneural mindsets. The course is three years long.

== Notable alumni ==
- Saweetie - rapper and songwriter
- P. J. Johnson - NFL player
