= Florin, California =

Florin
- census-designated place
- Interactive map of Florin
- Location in California Location in the United States
- Coordinates: 38°29′25″N 121°24′39″W
- Country: United States
- State: California
- County: Sacramento

Area
  - Total: 8.713 sq mi (22.57 km^{2})
  - Land: 8.713 sq mi (22.57 km^{2})
  - Water: 0 sq mi (0 km^{2}) 0%
- Elevation: 33 ft (10 m)

Population (2020)
  - Total: 52,388
  - Density: 6,013/sq mi (2,321/km^{2})
- Time zone: UTC-8 (PST)
  - Summer (DST): UTC-7 (PDT)
- ZIP code: 95828
- Area codes: 916, 279
- FIPS code: 06-24498
- GNIS feature ID: 0277515

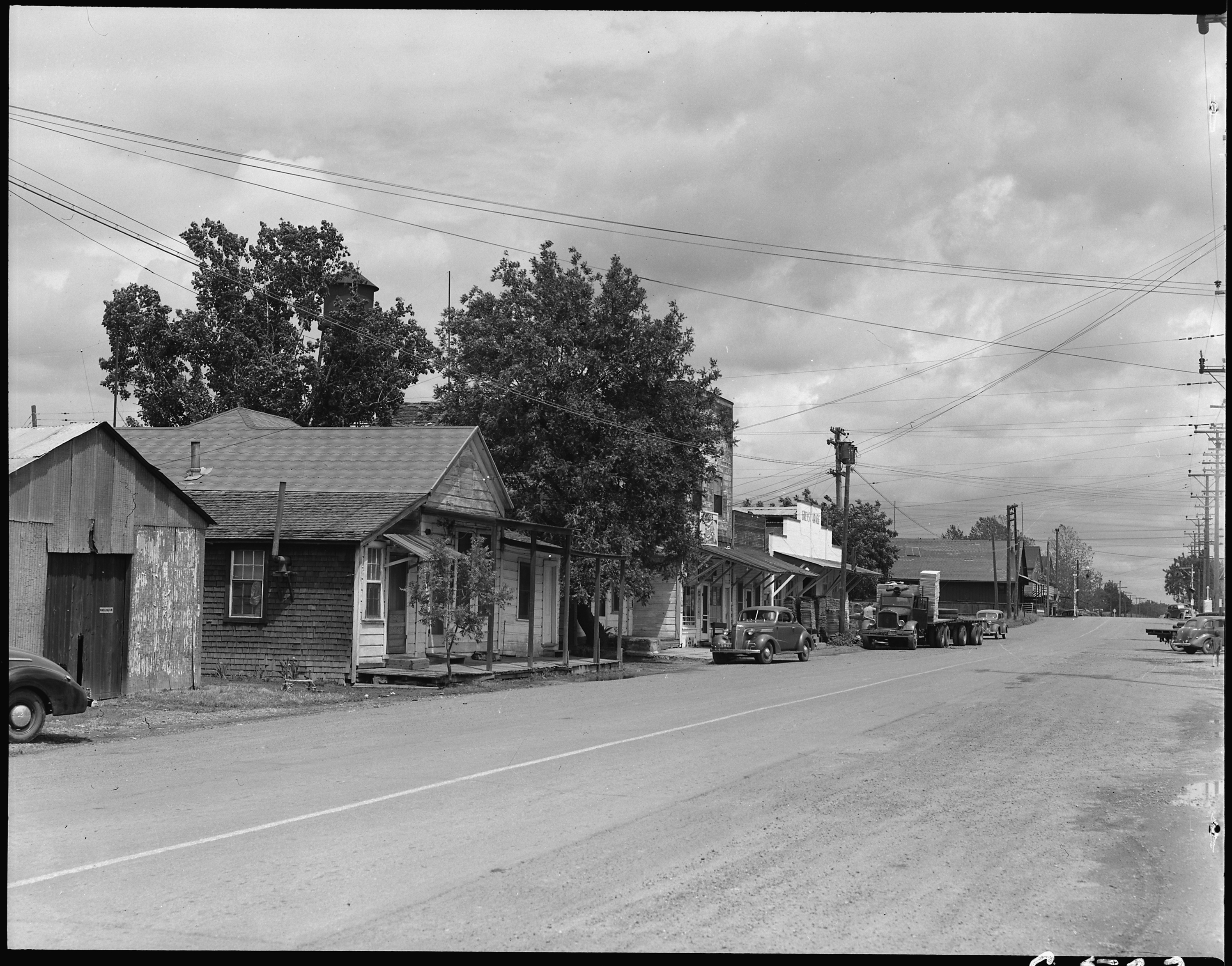
Florin in 1942

Florin is a census-designated place (CDP) in Sacramento County, California, United States. It is part of the Sacramento metropolitan area. The population was 52,388 at the 2020 census, up from 47,513 at the 2010 census and 27,653 at the 2000 census.

== Geography ==
Florin is located at 38°29′25″N 121°24′39″W (38.490157, -121.410862).

According to the United States Census Bureau, the CDP has a total area of 8.7 square miles (23 km^{2}), all land.

== Demographics ==
Historical population
| Census | Pop. | Note | %± |
|---|---|---|---|
| 1970 | 9,640 | | — |
| 1980 | 16,523 | | 71.4% |
| 1990 | 24,330 | | 47.2% |
| 2000 | 27,653 | | 13.7% |
| 2010 | 47,513 | | 71.8% |
| 2020 | 52,388 | | 10.3% |
U.S. Decennial Census; 1970 1980; 1990 2000 2010

=== 2020 census ===
As of the 2020 census, Florin had a population of 52,388 and a population density of 6,012.6 inhabitants per square mile (2,321.5/km^{2}). The census reported that 99.6% of residents lived in urban areas and 0.4% lived in rural areas. Overall, 98.8% of the population lived in households, 1.0% lived in non-institutionalized group quarters, and 0.2% were institutionalized.

There were 16,068 households, of which 39.2% had children under the age of 18 living in them. Of all households, 42.8% were married-couple households, 7.2% were cohabiting couple households, 31.5% had a female householder with no partner present, and 18.5% had a male householder with no partner present. About 20.5% of all households were made up of individuals, and 9.9% had someone living alone who was 65 years of age or older. The average household size was 3.22, and there were 11,803 families (73.5% of households).

The age distribution was 25.7% under 18, 9.5% aged 18 to 24, 26.5% aged 25 to 44, 23.8% aged 45 to 64, and 14.5% who were 65 years of age or older. The median age was 35.4 years. For every 100 females, there were 95.8 males, and for every 100 females age 18 and over, there were 93.7 males age 18 and over.

There were 16,465 housing units at an average density of 1,889.7/sq mi (729.6/km^{2}), of which 16,068 (97.6%) were occupied. Of the occupied housing units, 53.7% were owner-occupied and 46.3% were occupied by renters. The overall vacancy rate was 2.4%, including a homeowner vacancy rate of 0.9% and a rental vacancy rate of 1.9%.

Racial composition as of the 2020 census
| Race | Number | Percent |
|---|---|---|
| White | 10,011 | 19.1% |
| Black or African American | 7,047 | 13.5% |
| American Indian and Alaska Native | 700 | 1.3% |
| Asian | 18,213 | 34.8% |
| Native Hawaiian and Other Pacific Islander | 1,318 | 2.5% |
| Some other race | 9,115 | 17.4% |
| Two or more races | 5,984 | 11.4% |
| Hispanic or Latino (of any race) | 15,033 | 28.7% |

=== 2023 American Community Survey ===
In 2023, the US Census Bureau estimated that 33.9% of the population were foreign-born. Of all people aged 5 or older, 45.5% spoke only English at home, 20.1% spoke Spanish, 5.5% spoke other Indo-European languages, 27.9% spoke Asian or Pacific Islander languages, and 0.9% spoke other languages. Of those aged 25 or older, 74.5% were high school graduates and 13.7% had a bachelor's degree.

The median household income was $66,323, and the per capita income was $27,497. About 16.3% of families and 18.0% of the population were below the poverty line.

=== 2010 census ===
The 2010 United States census reported that Florin had a population of 47,513. The population density was 5,459.7 inhabitants per square mile (2,108.0/km^{2}). The racial makeup of Florin was 15,034 (13.0%) White, 7,521 (12.5%) African American, 543 (2.6%) Native American, 13,605 (35.8%) Asian, 815 (2.6%) Pacific Islander, 6,756 (14.2%) from other races, and 3,239 (7.0%) from two or more races. Hispanic or Latino of any race were 13,048 persons (29.3%).

The Census reported that 47,212 people (99.4% of the population) lived in households, 294 (0.6%) lived in non-institutionalized group quarters, and 7 (0%) were institutionalized.

There were 14,804 households, out of which 6,434 (43.5%) had children under the age of 18 living in them, 6,551 (44.3%) were opposite-sex married couples living together, 2,972 (20.1%) had a female householder with no husband present, 1,317 (8.9%) had a male householder with no wife present. There were 1,077 (7.3%) unmarried opposite-sex partnerships, and 127 (0.9%) same-sex married couples or partnerships. 3,173 households (21.4%) were made up of individuals, and 1,322 (8.9%) had someone living alone who was 65 years of age or older. The average household size was 3.19. There were 10,840 families (73.2% of all households); the average family size was 3.71.

The population was spread out, with 13,801 people (29.0%) under the age of 18, 5,154 people (10.8%) aged 18 to 24, 12,447 people (26.2%) aged 25 to 44, 10,747 people (22.6%) aged 45 to 64, and 5,364 people (11.3%) who were 65 years of age or older. The median age was 32.1 years. For every 100 females, there were 96.2 males. For every 100 females age 18 and over, there were 92.9 males.

There were 16,070 housing units at an average density of 1,846.6 per square mile (713.0/km^{2}), of which 8,173 (55.2%) were owner-occupied, and 6,631 (44.8%) were occupied by renters. The homeowner vacancy rate was 2.3%; the rental vacancy rate was 8.9%. 24,612 people (51.8% of the population) lived in owner-occupied housing units and 22,600 people (47.6%) lived in rental housing units.

== Government ==
In the California State Legislature, Florin is in the 8th senatorial district, represented by Democrat Angelique Ashby, and in the 10th Assembly district, represented by Democrat Stephanie Nguyen.

In the United States House of Representatives, Florin is in California's 7th congressional district, represented by Democrat Doris Matsui.

== History ==
=== Founding and Early History ===
Florin began as a small town located on the Central Pacific Railroad, and was named in the 1860s for the many wild flowers growing in the area. Its early history saw a train station, post office, general store, and school built in the 1870s.

=== Prewar ===
During the early 20th century Florin's economy focused on agricultural production. Strawberries were the most common produce grown. Japanese immigrants were the dominant group in Florin and they were the predominant farmers in Florin, making the area noted for being a Japanese immigrant community. This immigrant group's rendering of land in Florin had some popular renown. "In his report to Governor William Stephens, Colonel John P. Irish, president of the California Delta Association, described Japanese triumph: 'They [the Californians] had seen the Japanese convert the barren land like that at Florin and Livingston into productive and profitable fields, orchards and vineyards, and intelligence of their industry.'"

The presence of Japanese immigrants in Florin was not always met with such good will as expressed by Colonel Irish. "As soon as a Jap can produce a lease," the Sacramento Bee warned, "he is entitled to a wife. He sends a copy of his lease back home and gets a picture bride and they increase like rats. Florin [a valley farming town] is producing 85 American-born Japs a year." This article was in critical response to the Gentlemen's Agreement of 1907 between the US and Japan.

=== World War II ===
Local and federal treatment of Nisei (Japanese immigrants and US-born Japanese Americans) in Florin took a drastic downturn upon the bombing of Pearl Harbor and the subsequent war between the US and Japan. At the time, about 2,500 Florin residents were Nikkei, forming a majority of the town's population. With a little fear and a lot of racial hostility, the federal government sent Japanese and Japanese Americans to internment camps according to FDR's Executive Order 9066. Florin Japanese American resident and educator Mary Tsukamoto recalled "everyone was given short notice for removal. Signs had been nailed to the telephone poles saying that we had to report to various spots." Florin's Japanese and Japanese American residents were forced to "register as families. We had to report to the Elk Grove Masonic Building where we were given our family numbers, No. 2076." The Elk Grove Masonic Building referred to by Tsukamoto was located in neighboring Elk Grove near a railroad station where the Florin residents were shipped in rail cars to distribution hubs. At these distribution hubs Florin's residents of Japanese descent were then sent to internment camps far from the coast.

The internment forever changed the character of Florin. Japanese and Japanese American residents had to sell their property within only a few days and often at prices far below their fair market value. When the Japanese and Japanese Americans were released from the internment camps some were able to return to Florin and start over. Most had to move on to other areas. Florin ceased to be a Japanese American community as it was before the internment.

== See also ==
- Bob Emmett Fletcher, American agricultural inspector who assisted Japanese American families during World War II
- Leonard M. Landsborough, early agriculturalist and politician
