= Vineyard, California =

Vineyard
- census-designated place
- Interactive map of Vineyard
- Location in California Location in the United States
- Coordinates: 38°27′52″N 121°20′49″W
- Country: United States
- State: California
- County: Sacramento

Area
  - Total: 18.748 sq mi (48.56 km^{2})
  - Land: 18.748 sq mi (48.56 km^{2})
  - Water: 0 sq mi (0 km^{2}) 0%
- Elevation: 66 ft (20 m)

Population (2020)
  - Total: 43,935
  - Density: 2,343.4/sq mi (904.81/km^{2})
- Time zone: UTC-8 (PST)
  - Summer (DST): UTC-7 (PDT)
- ZIP code: 95829
- Area codes: 916, 279
- FIPS code: 06-82852

Vineyard is a census-designated place (CDP) in Sacramento County, California, United States. It is part of the Sacramento metropolitan area. The population was 43,935 at the 2020 census, up from 24,836 at the 2010 census. Vineyard doubled its population twice in two consecutive decades, and grew to become one of Greater Sacramento's most racially diverse suburbs.

== Geography ==
Vineyard is located at 38°27′52″N 121°20′49″W (38.464488, -121.346917).

It is bordered roughly by Jackson Road on the north, roughly a line 1/4 mile to the east of Grant Line Road, Calvine Road on the south, and Elk Grove Florin Road on the west.

According to the United States Census Bureau, the CDP has a total area of 18.7 square miles (48 km^{2}), all land.

== Demographics ==
Historical population
Census	Pop.	Note	%±
2000	10,109		—
2010	24,836		145.7%
2020	43,935		76.9%
U.S. Decennial Census; 1850–1870 1880-1890; 1900 1910 1920; 1930 1940 1950; 1960 1970 1980; 1990 2000 2010

Vineyard first appeared as a census designated place in the 2000 U.S. census.

=== 2020 census ===
As of the 2020 census, Vineyard had a population of 43,935 and a population density of 2,343.4 inhabitants per square mile (904.8/km^{2}). The census reported that 99.5% of residents lived in households, 0.4% lived in non-institutionalized group quarters, and 0.1% were institutionalized.

The median age was 36.6 years; 25.9% of residents were under the age of 18, 9.3% were 18 to 24, 25.8% were 25 to 44, 26.1% were 45 to 64, and 12.8% were 65 years of age or older. For every 100 females there were 95.7 males, and for every 100 females age 18 and over there were 92.3 males age 18 and over.

There were 12,746 households; 44.7% had children under the age of 18 living in them. Of all households, 59.2% were married-couple households, 6.1% were cohabiting couple households, 12.5% were households with a male householder and no spouse or partner present, and 22.3% were households with a female householder and no spouse or partner present. About 13.1% of households were made up of individuals, and 5.6% had someone living alone who was 65 years of age or older. The average household size was 3.43, and there were 10,528 families (82.6% of households).

There were 13,017 housing units at an average density of 694.3 units per square mile (268.1 units/km^{2}), of which 12,746 (97.9%) were occupied and 2.1% were vacant. Of the occupied units, 77.1% were owner-occupied and 22.9% were occupied by renters. The homeowner vacancy rate was 0.8% and the rental vacancy rate was 1.5%.

Overall, 95.4% of residents lived in urban areas and 4.6% lived in rural areas.

Racial composition as of the 2020 census
Race	Number	Percent
White	11,432	26.0%
Black or African American	4,432	10.1%
American Indian and Alaska Native	474	1.1%
Asian	17,555	40.0%
Native Hawaiian and Other Pacific Islander	781	1.8%
Some other race	3,963	9.0%
Two or more races	5,298	12.1%
Hispanic or Latino (of any race)	8,426	19.2%

=== 2023 estimates ===
In 2023, the US Census Bureau estimated that 31.9% of the population were foreign-born. Of all people aged 5 or older, 53.3% spoke only English at home, 9.1% spoke Spanish, 13.5% spoke other Indo-European languages, 22.9% spoke Asian or Pacific Islander languages, and 1.2% spoke other languages. Of those aged 25 or older, 85.5% were high school graduates and 31.3% had a bachelor's degree.

The median household income was $108,403, and the per capita income was $39,812. About 9.7% of families and 12.6% of the population were below the poverty line.

== Expansion plans ==
Recently, plans have been announced to add as many as 20,000 new homes to Vineyard, which could add as many as 60,000 new people to the CDP. Along with the houses would come new shopping centers, parks, and schools. Some have been critical of the expansion, and one California State University, Sacramento professor referred to it as "car-oriented sprawl development." However, there are plans to extend some sort of public transportation to Vineyard and to build around the train tracks that go through the town.

== Politics ==
In the state legislature, Vineyard is located in the 8th senatorial district, represented by Democrat Angelique Ashby, and in the 10th Assembly district, represented by Democrat Stephanie Nguyen.

Federally, Vineyard is in California's 7th congressional district, represented by Democrat Doris Matsui.

== Education ==
Vineyard is served solely by the Elk Grove Unified School District. Schools within Vineyard's boundary include four elementary schools as well as T.R. Smedberg Middle School, Katherine L. Albiani Middle School, Sheldon High School (California), and Pleasant Grove High School (California).
