= Franklin High School (Elk Grove, California) =

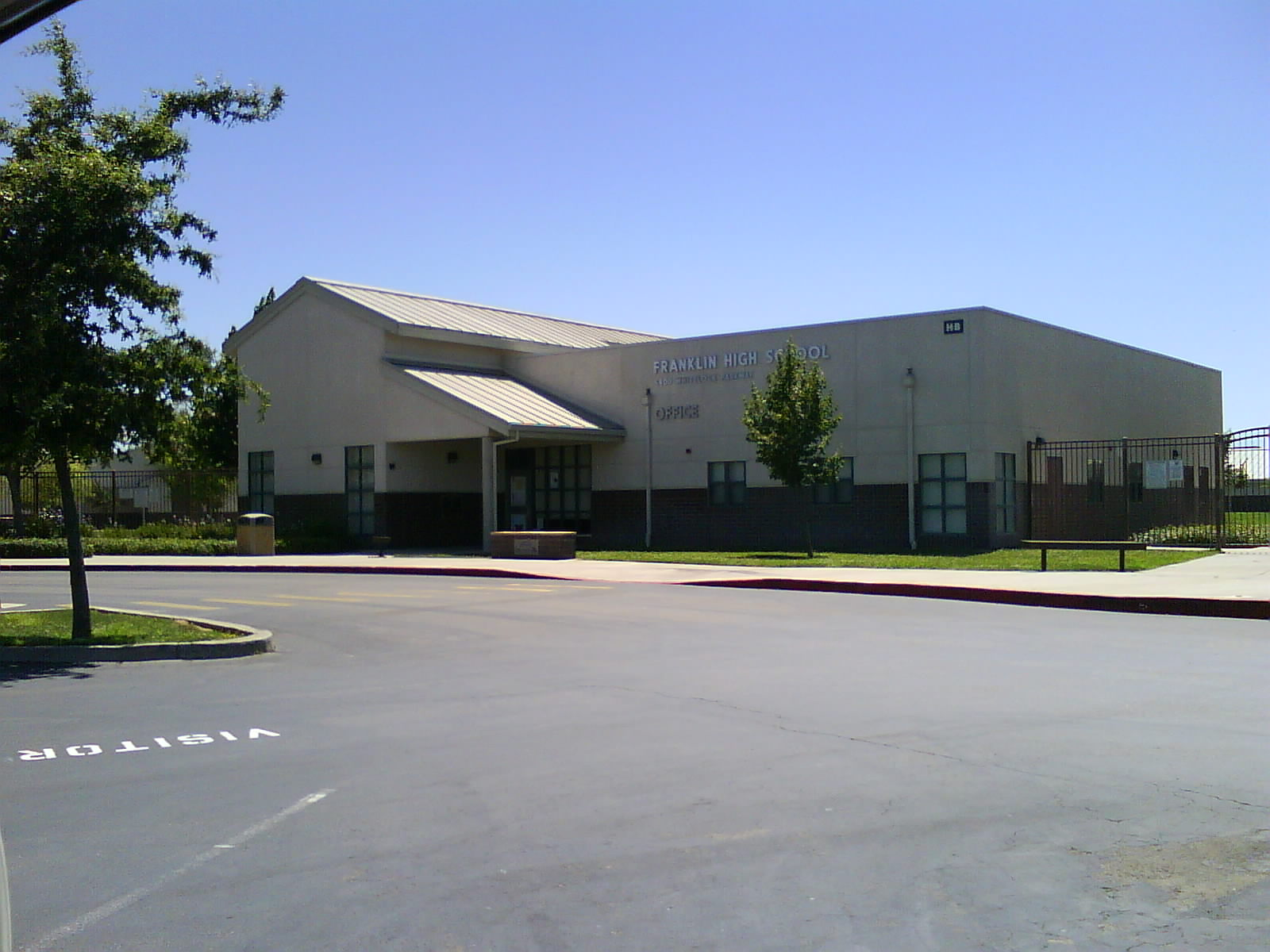

Location
- 6400 Whitelock Parkway; Elk Grove, Sacramento County, California 95757; United States; 38.392818°N 121.43019°W

Information
- Type: Public
- Opened: 2002
- School district: Elk Grove Unified School District
- Principal: Adam Wood
- Teaching staff: 112.37 (FTE)
- Grades: 9–12
- Enrollment: 2,659 (2023–2024)
- Student to teacher ratio: 23.64
- Colors: Purple, white, and black
- Team name: Wildcats
- Feeder schools: Toby Johnson Middle School
- Website: frhs.egusd.net

Franklin High School is a public high school located in Elk Grove, California, United States. It is officially accredited by the Western Association of Schools and Colleges (WASC).

== History of the town of Franklin ==
In 1856, the town of Franklin was founded by an enterprising gentleman named Andrew George, who established the town 14 mi (23 km) south of Sacramento, California on Lower Stockton Road. Now known as Franklin Boulevard, this had been the main road from Sutter's Fort to the Mexican capital of Monterey. During the California gold rush, this road became the stage route to Stockton.

George did not originally name the town Franklin, as it is known today. He called it "Georgetown", after himself, and the post office there was known by that name. The hotel he built was, however, given the name "Franklin House" in honor of his mother's family, the Franklins.

== Campus ==
Franklin High School shares parts of its campus with Toby Johnson Middle School and the Franklin Community Library (Which is run by the Sacramento Public Library (SPL) system.) In addition to their academic program, Franklin High School offers the STEAM academy, AVID, athletics, and Visual and Performing Arts (VAPA). The VAPA program provides ceramics, theater acting, photography, animation, graphic design, filmography, art, band, dance, choir, guitar workshop, and piano lab.

== Athletics ==
Franklin High School offers a variety of athletics including Baseball, Softball, Girls' and Boys' Basketball, Cheer, Cross Country, Diving, Football, Girls' and Boys' Golf, Girls' and Boys' Soccer, Swim, Girls' and Boys' Tennis, Track, Girls' and Boys' Volleyball, Water Polo, and Wrestling.

== Gallery ==
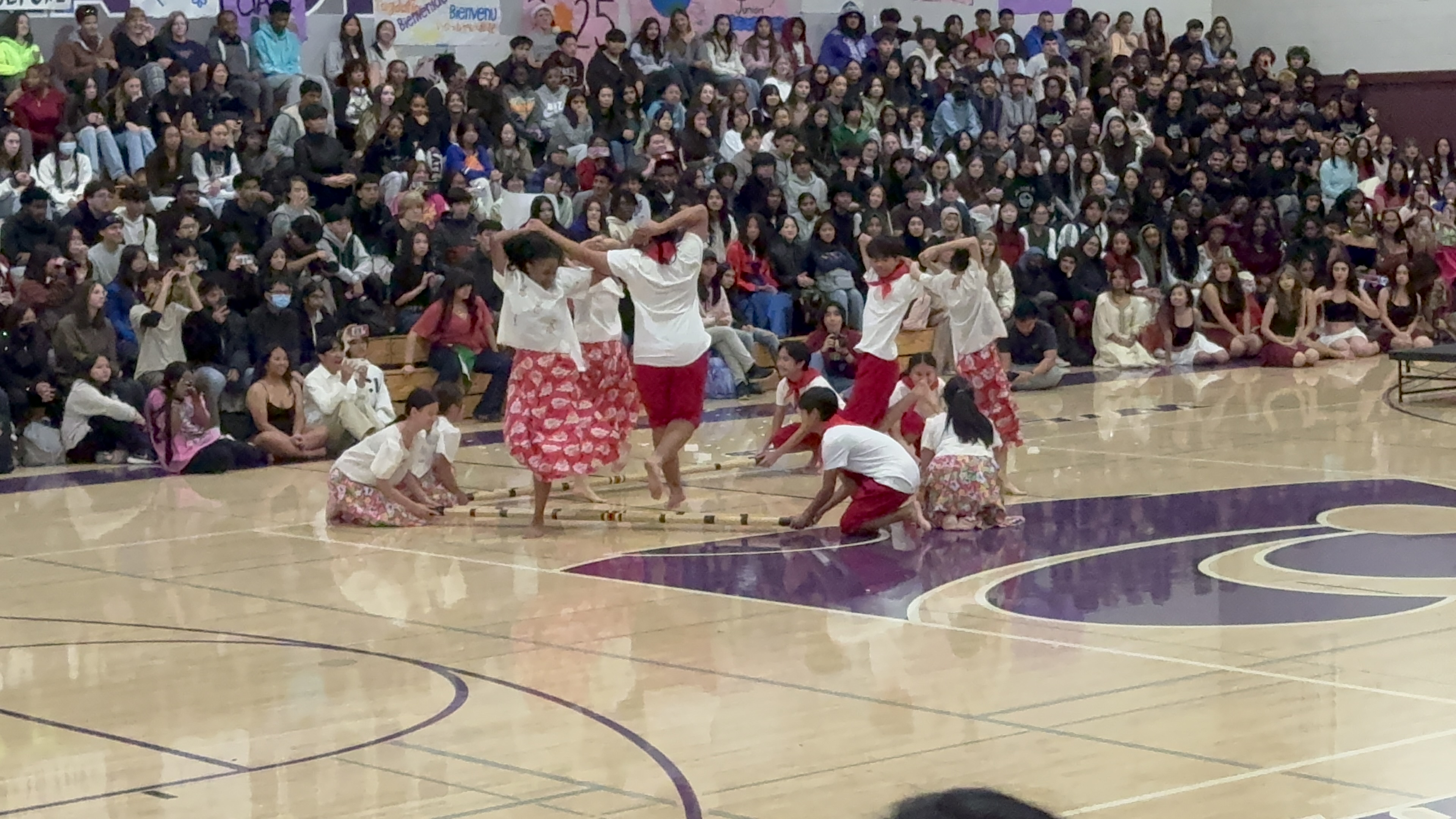
Tinkling Dance Club performing during Franklin High School's annual Multicultural Rally in 2023.

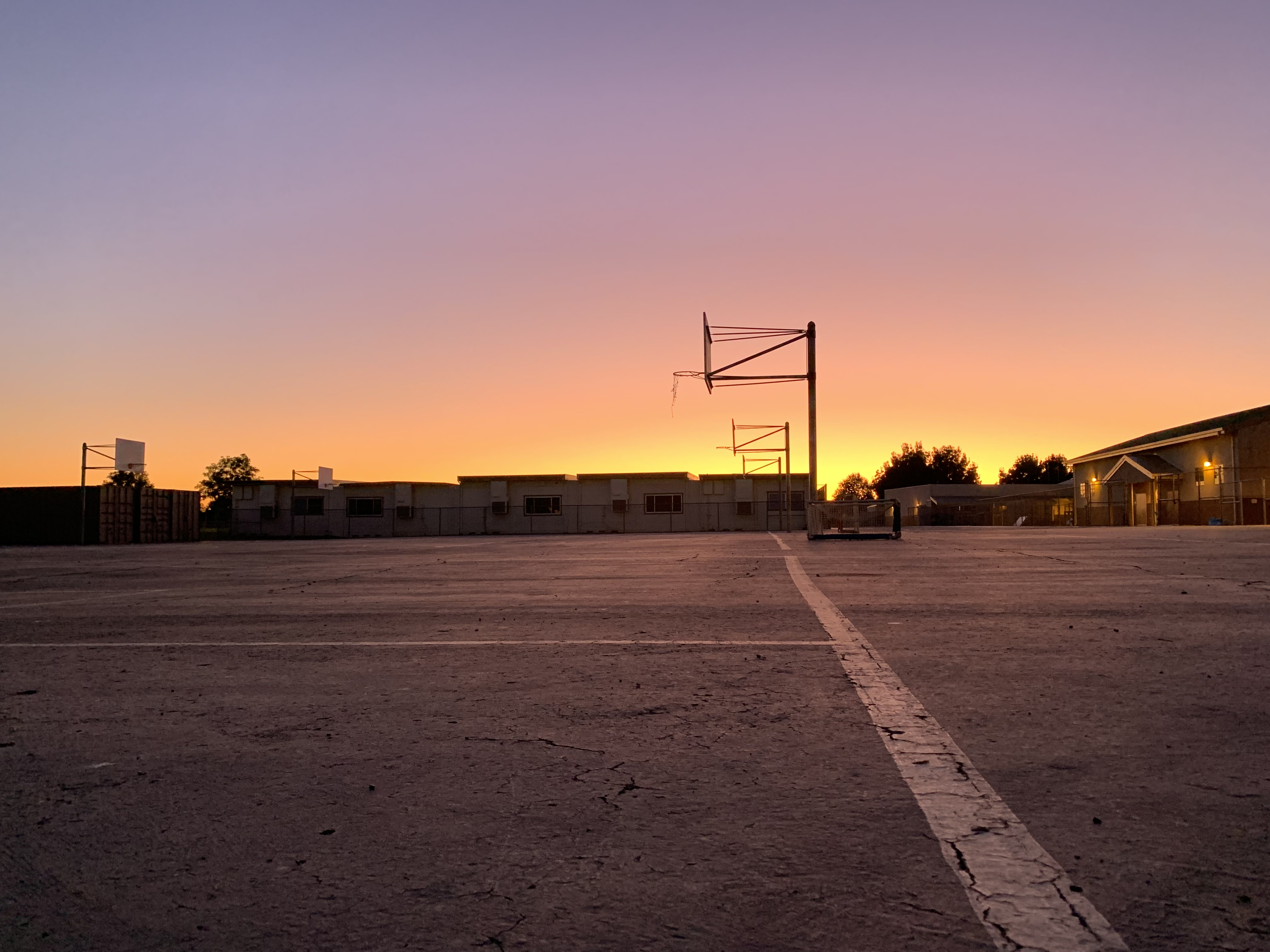
Franklin High School's outdoor basketball courts

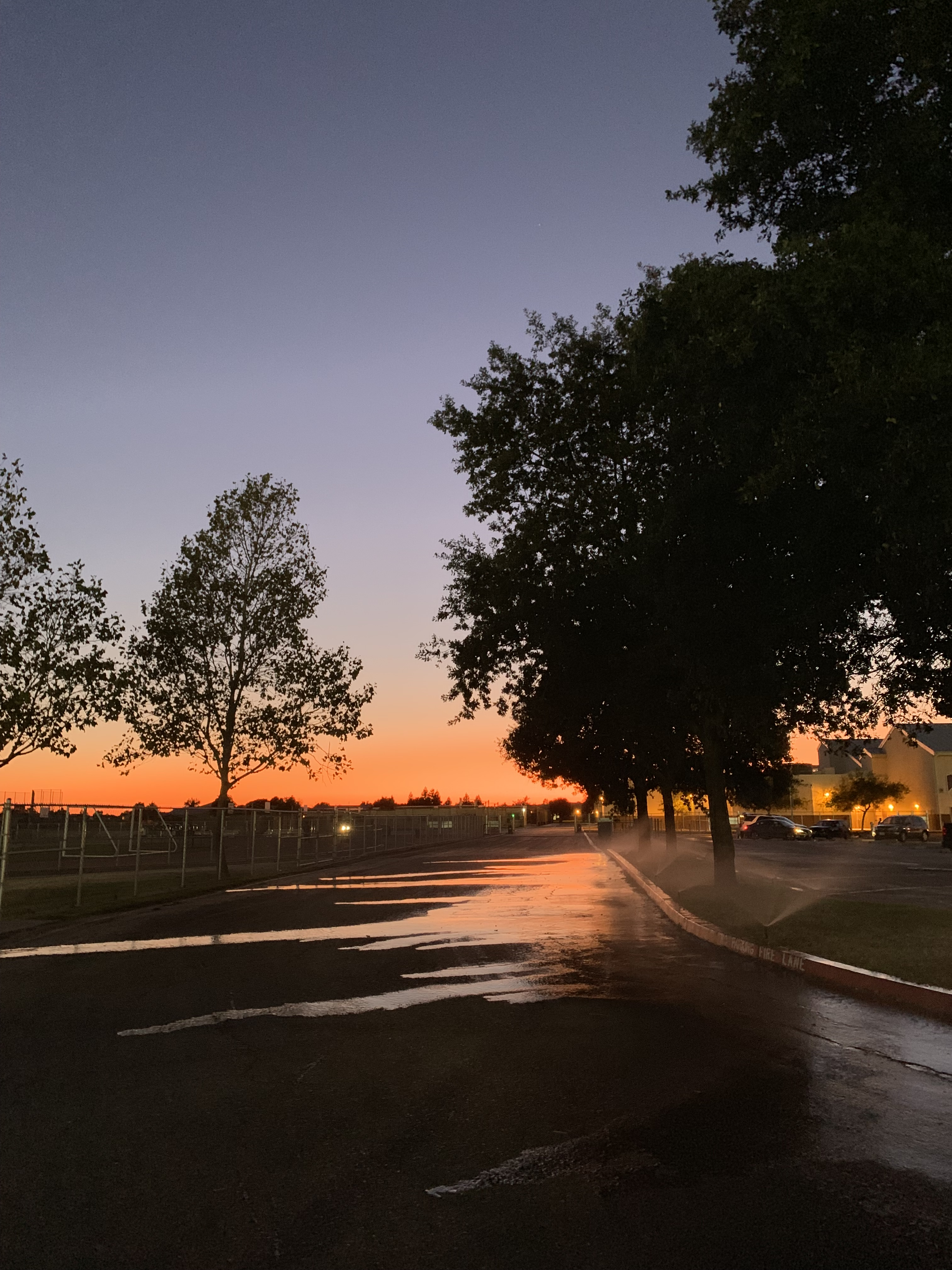
Franklin High School's rear bus gate and student parking lot
