= Sacramento City College =

Community college in Sacramento, California, US

- Former name: Sacramento Junior College
- Type: Public community college
- Established: 1916; 110 years ago
- Parent institution: Los Rios Community College District
- Accreditation: ACCJC
- President: Albert Garcia
- Students: 21,626 (Fall 2025)
- Location: Sacramento, California, United States; 38.541578°N 121.491075°W
- Colors
- Mascot: Panthers
- Website: scc.losrios.edu

Sacramento City College (SCC) is a public community college in Sacramento, California. SCC is part of the Los Rios Community College District and had an enrollment of 25,307 in 2009. It is accredited by the Accrediting Commission for Community and Junior Colleges (ACCJC), offering Associate in Science (A.S) and Associate in Art (A.A.) degrees.

== History ==
Founded in 1916 as a department of Sacramento High School, Sacramento City College is the seventh oldest public community college in California and the oldest institution of higher learning in Sacramento.

Rare for its time, Sacramento City College was founded by a woman (Belle Cooledge) and with an all female class as its first graduates, the college began with the spirit of inclusion. First known as Sacramento Junior College, Cooledge founded the college to provide a safe, welcoming place for students to learn the basics for a college education, and to be a gathering spot for extra-curricular activities that would bring the community together.

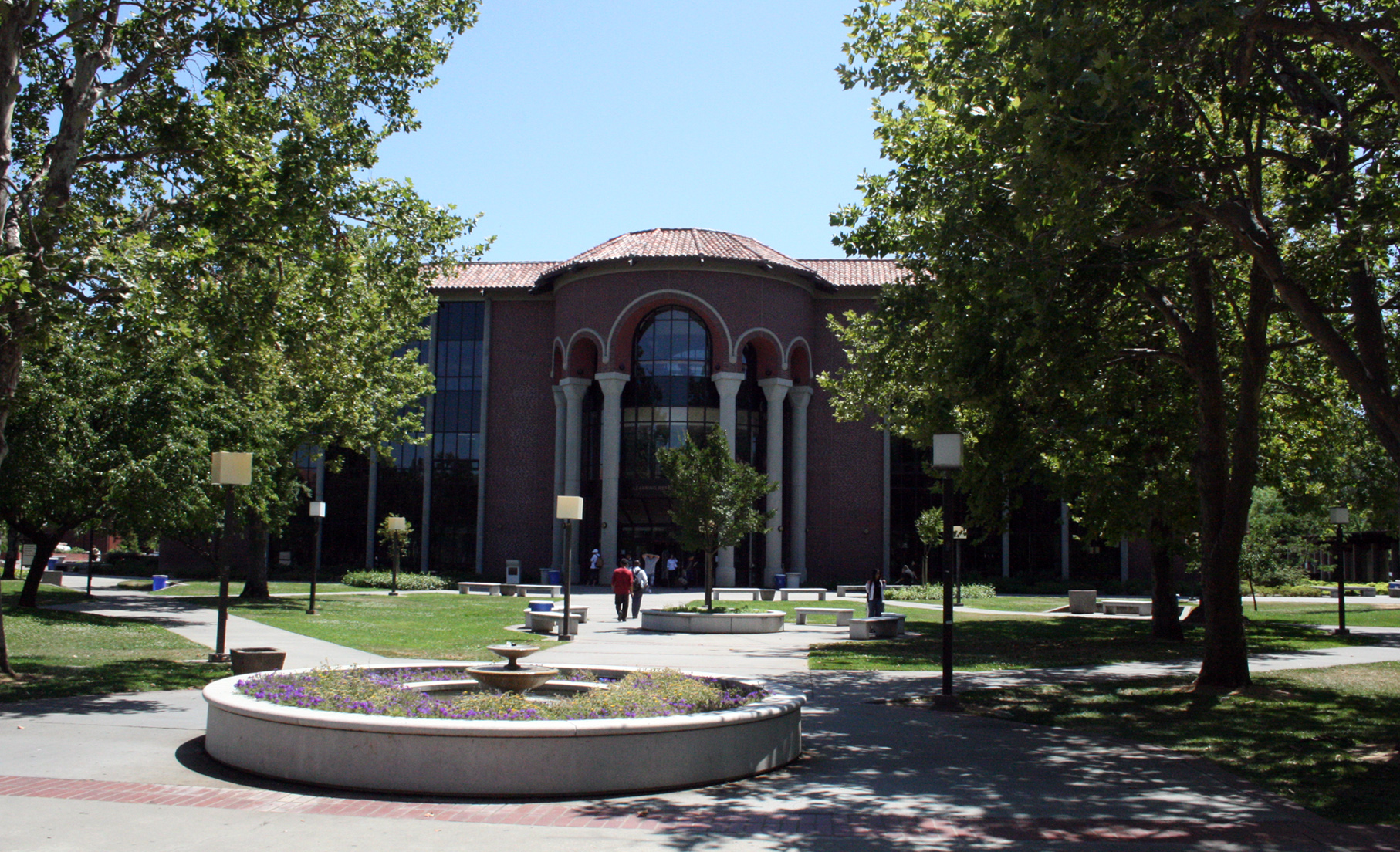
Sacramento City College Library and plaza

In 1922, the citizens of Sacramento organized a junior college district, effectively granting Sacramento Junior College its administrative independence from Sacramento High School. This plan of organization remained in force until 1936, when the college became a part of the Sacramento City Unified School District.

Twenty-eight years later, as a result of a March 17, 1964, election, Sacramento City College separated from the Sacramento City Unified School District to join the newly organized Los Rios Junior College District, which took over the operation of American River College and Sacramento City College. Los Rios paid the total of $1.00 for the 75-acre (300,000 m^{2}) Sacramento City College Campus. In October 1967, the Sacramento Pop Festival was held at the main campus' Charles C. Hughes Stadium. In 1970, the newly renamed Los Rios Community College District opened a third campus, Cosumnes River College. Folsom Lake College has recently been added to the district.

== Student life ==
There are over 50 student clubs and groups on campus, although there are no official fraternities or sororities. The campus does not offer any dorms.

=== Student publications ===
The Sacramento City College yearbook was called the Pioneer when initially published in the 1920s. The format changed in the early 1970s, and it was discontinued by 1980. The school newspaper-originally named "the Blotter" in the 1920s—would be called "The Pony Express" for several decades. It is now called "the Express."

| Men's sports | Women's sports |
|---|---|
| Baseball | Basketball |
| Basketball | Cross Country |
| Cross Country | Golf |
| Football | Soccer |
| Swimming & diving | Softball |
| Track & field | Swimming & diving |
| Wrestling | Tennis |
| | Track & field |
| | Volleyball |
| | Water Polo |

== Athletics ==
The Sacramento City College Panthers are members of the California Community College Athletic Association (CCCAA), and the Big 8 Conference. SCC fields 18 teams, including 10 women's teams and 8 men's teams. The baseball program has demonstrated the most consistent success with 37 league titles, 5 state titles, and 1 national title. On the women's side, the track and field team won 3 straight state titles (2003, 2004, 2005), while the softball program won 4 state titles between 1988 and 2004. Sac City's athletic alumni have competed in the Olympic Games, the World Series, the NFL playoffs, and a world championship boxing match. Several of its coaches (and former coaches) have coached or served in administrative positions on a national and international level, including the Olympic Games, the NFL, and Major League Baseball.

== Notable alumni ==
Notable alumni from SCC include Sasha Gray, Academy Award-winning actress Jessica Chastain, senior United States district judge Morrison C. England Jr., and Congressman John E. Moss.
