= Los Rios Community College District =

Special-purpose district in California, U.S

Coordinates: 38°34′46″N 121°25′1″W

Campus of Sacramento City College

Library at Sacramento City College

The Los Rios Community College District is a special-purpose district providing administrative services and governance for the community colleges serving the greater Sacramento area and points east all the way to Lake Tahoe.

The Los Rios Community College district is run by CEO/chancellor (Daniel) Brian King of Folsom, California. King's previous occupation was the president of the Cabrillo Community College in Aptos, California. His education includes Duke University, University of Missouri (Mizzou), as well as Alabama State University.

The educational facilities provided by the district include four accredited colleges, and several off-campus "educational centers" located to serve specific geographic communities:

- American River College – northeast of Sacramento in North Highlands, California
  - Natomas Center – in Natomas near the former Sleep Train Arena
  - Public Safety Training Center - in McClellan Park
  - Mather Center - in the former Mather Air Force Base
- Cosumnes River College – in the southern Sacramento neighborhood of Valley Hi
  - Elk Grove Center in the City of Elk Grove
- Folsom Lake College – east of Sacramento in Folsom
  - El Dorado Center – east of Placerville
  - Rancho Cordova Center
- Sacramento City College – downtown Sacramento
  - West Sacramento Center
  - Davis Center – farther west, on UC Davis campus
  - McClellan Business Park – North Highlands

== Administration ==
Governance and public oversight is provided by a board of trustees whose seven members are elected to four-year terms by the public from different geographical trustee areas.

Common administrative services such as human resources, purchasing, accounting, and information technology are provided for the colleges at a separate off-campus district office complex. Los Rios' main office is at 1919 Spanos Court in the Arden-Arcade area of Sacramento County.

== History ==
The results of a March 17, 1964, election led to the 1965 formation of the Los Rios Junior College District to govern Sacramento City College (1916) which separated from the Sacramento City Unified School District, and American River College (1942) which separated from the Grant Joint Union High School District. When the district was formed there were 10,632 students attending the two colleges.

One of the first actions of the new Los Rios district was to form a planning committee which, in 1967, acquired new land for future colleges: north of Sacramento in Natomas, south near Elk Grove, and east near Folsom. That committee proved to be accurate in their predictions of growth, which has been invaluable to the district over time. Property values in these areas have soared and acquiring the amount of land necessary for a complete college campus today might be prohibitively expensive.

In 1970 the district opened Cosumnes River College on the site to the south.

By 1980 combined enrollment in the district's three colleges was about 44,500 students.

By 1995 combined enrollment in the district's three colleges was about 53,000 students.

In 2004 the district opened California's 109th community college, Folsom Lake College, on the site to the east of Sacramento in Folsom.

By 2005 combined enrollment in the district's four colleges was about 71,000 students.

By 2010 combined enrollment in the district's four colleges was over 84,000 students.
