= Arthur A. Benjamin Health Professions High School =

Coordinates: 38.56132°N 121.51164°W

Arthur A. Benjamin Health Professions High School (AABHPHS)

Location
- 451 McClatchy Way; Sacramento, California 95818; United States

Information
- Type: Small; Medical field
- Established: Fall 2005
- School district: Sacramento City Unified School District
- Principal: Malcolm Floyd
- Enrollment: 195 (2024-2025)
- Campus: Five Structures: A, B, C, D, and Multi-purpose Room
- Colors: Black, silver, and green
- Mascot: Jerry the Jaguar
- Website: hphs.scusd.edu

Arthur A. Benjamin Health Professions High School (AABHPHS) is a high school in the Upper Land Park neighborhood of Sacramento, California. It is a member of the Sacramento City Unified School District.

== History ==
During the fall of 2002, developers met with other founding partners to discuss the potential merits of a small healthcare high school for Sacramento. A perceived shortage of healthcare workers in the Sacramento area encouraged the opening of the school.

In 2005, a temporary campus was built for inaugural freshmen for one year. In late 2006, the final campus was completed.

AABHPHS is named after the late US Air Force Senior Master Sergeant Arthur A. Benjamin, who was also a life support systems specialist and instructor in the United States Air Force; prior Director for the U.C. Davis Medical Center Cancer Ward; prior Air Force Junior ROTC instructor from nearby Hiram Johnson High School, and prior principal for Hiram Johnson.

== Policies and Curriculum ==
The school has a strict scrub uniform policy. It focuses on college preparation and certifications such as Certified nursing assistant, CPR/BLS and Stop the Bleed

== Extracurricular and academic activities ==
The school offers many extracurricular activities that include: badminton, basketball, volleyball, Latino club, yearbook, leadership, socialist student union, black student union, photography, and Baile folklórico.
