= Zach Andrews =

American basketball player (born 1985)

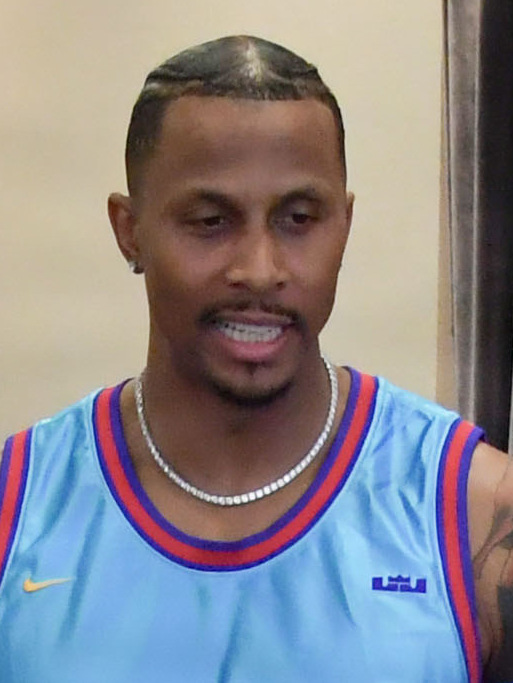
- Andrews in 2026

Personal information
- Born: March 9, 1985 (age 41) Oakland, California, US
- Listed height: 6 ft 9 in (2.06 m)
- Listed weight: 230 lb (104 kg)

Career information
- High school: Cordova (Rancho Cordova, California)
- College: Yuba CC (2003–2005); Bradley (2005–2007)
- NBA draft: 2007: undrafted
- Playing career: 2007–2018
- Position: Power forward

Career history
- 2007: Costa Urbana
- 2008: Genc Banvitliler
- 2008–2009: Rayet Guadalajara
- 2009–2011: Peñas Huesca
- 2011: Niigata Albirex
- 2011–2012: Los Angeles Lakers
- 2012: Santa Barbara Breakers
- 2012: Sutor Montegranaro
- 2013: Los Angeles D-Fenders
- 2013–2014: Osaka Evessa
- 2014: Fuerza Regia
- 2014–2016: Los Angeles Defenders
- 2016: Iowa Energy
- 2017: Sagesse Beirut
- 2017–2018: Northern Arizona Suns

Career highlights
- NBA D-League All-Star (2012); LEB Plata All-Imports Team (2010); All-LEB Plata Second Team (2010)
- Stats at Basketball Reference

Zachary Leon Andrews (born March 9, 1985) is an American professional basketball player who last played for the Northern Arizona Suns of the NBA G League. He grew up in Rancho Cordova, California and played college basketball for Yuba College and Bradley University.

== Early life ==
Andrews lived in poverty with his mother and three siblings in Oakland, California as a young child. He later grew up in foster homes for nearly a decade before reuniting with his biological mother to public housing in Sacramento, California as a teenager. Andrews graduated from Cordova High School of Rancho Cordova, California in 2003. At Cordova, Andrews lettered in both basketball and football.

== College career ==
=== Yuba (2003–2005) ===
Andrews enrolled at Yuba College, a junior college in Marysville, California. He helped its basketball program make the Elite Eight of the California Community College Athletic Association state tournament in 2004 with a program-best record of 24–7 and averaged 10 points and 9 rebounds as a freshman in the 2003–04 season. As a sophomore (2004–05), Andrews earned Bay Valley East All-Conference honors after leading the league with 10.5 rebounds and 2.2 blocked shots per game, finished second in the league in field goal percentage (.584), and was ninth in scoring (13.5 points). He earned the number-one spot on the "Top 10 Plays" of an edition of SportsCenter in 2005 after leaping over a player of the opposing team to slam an alley-oop.

=== Bradley (2005–2007) ===
In 2005, Andrews transferred to Bradley University in Peoria, Illinois and played two seasons on the Bradley Braves men's basketball team. Twice the Missouri Valley Conference selected Andrews as Player of the Week (December 19, 2005 and November 20, 2006). Andrews played in two 22-win seasons.

As a starter, Andrews averaged 9.3 points and 6.7 rebounds during his junior year (2005–06) and averaged 3.9 points and 4.2 rebounds as a reserve. On December 14, 2005, against Western Kentucky, Andrews had his second double-double of the season and tied a school record 11 offensive boards, 19 points, and 15 rebounds. Bradley advanced to the "Sweet 16" regional semifinal of the 2006 NCAA tournament.

On 64% field goal shooting, Andrews averaged 11.1 points and 7.0 rebounds as a senior in 2006–07. For the spring 2007 semester, Andrews made the honor roll of the Bradley athletic director. Bradley made the second round of the 2007 National Invitation Tournament.

== Professional career ==
Andrews worked out with the Sacramento Kings in the summer of 2007 after going undrafted in the 2007 NBA draft. After an attempt to join Farho Gijón of Spanish third-tier LEB Plata fell through, Andrews signed with Costa Urbana Playas de Santa Pola of LEB Plata instead. After an injury, Santa Pola waived Andrews.

In January 2008, Andrews signed with Genc Banvitliler of Turkish Basketball Second League and played the last 14 games of the season, averaging 11.6 points, 10.8 rebounds, and 2 assists. Andrews was an honorable mention all-league pick. He was the only American on the team.

For the 2008–09 season, Andrews played for Rayet Guadalajara of Spanish fourth-tier LEB Bronce and averaged 12.1 points and 10.2 rebounds. Again, Andrews was an honorable mention all-league selection.

He played for CB Peñas Huesca of third-tier LEB Plata the next season and averaged 11.9 points and 7.4 rebounds and was a 2010 second team all-LEB Plata selection and All-Import selection.

In the 2010–11 season, Andrews played for Niigata Albirex of the Japanese Bj league and averaged 11.1 points and 10.8 rebounds.

Andrews signed with the Los Angeles D-Fenders of the NBA Development League after a tryout before the 2011–12 season. Andrews signed with the D-Fenders' NBA parent team Los Angeles Lakers on December 9, 2011. Four days after the Lakers waived Andrews, the D-Fenders re-acquired Andrews on December 26. Andrews started 42 of 44 games for the D-Fenders and averaged 9.3 points on 64.7% shooting and 7.3 rebounds in 25.4 minutes per game.

Andrews began the 2012–13 season playing two games for Sutor Montegranaro of Italian Lega Basket Serie A. On January 15, 2013, Andrews was reacquired by the Los Angeles D-Fenders. Later that year, he signed with Osaka Evessa of Japan for the 2013–14 season.

After a one-game stint for Fuerza Regia in November 2014, Andrews was reacquired once again by the Los Angeles D-Fenders on December 20, 2014. On October 31, 2015, he was reacquired by the D-Fenders for the 2015–16 season. On January 29, 2016, he was traded to the Iowa Energy, along with two 2016 fifth-round picks, in exchange for Michael Holyfield and a 2016 fourth-round pick. The next day, he made his debut with the Energy in an 87–83 loss to the Canton Charge, recording two points and two rebounds in eight minutes. On February 19, he was waived by Iowa.

Andrews competed for Team 23 in The Basketball Tournament. He was a center on the 2015 team who made it to the $1 million championship game, falling 67–65 to Overseas Elite.

On October 24, 2017, Andrews was called up by the Northern Arizona Suns for training camp. He made their official roster at the start of the season. However, after playing in only three regular season games, Andrews was waived on November 12, 2017, in order to acquire forward Malik Dime on their roster. He was reacquired by Northern Arizona on February 2, 2018.
