= BECU =

Credit union based in Washington State, U.S.

Boeing Employees' Credit Union
- Trade name: BECU
- Formerly: Fellowship Credit Union (1935–1949)
- Type: Private
- Industry: Financial services
- Founded: December 7, 1935; 90 years ago
- Headquarters: Tukwila, Washington, U.S.
- Key people: Beverly Anderson (CEO and president); Debra Somberg (board chairperson)
- Products: Savings; checking; consumer loans; mortgages; credit cards; online banking
- Number of employees: 3,200 (2024)
- Website: becu.org

The Boeing Employees' Credit Union, doing business as BECU, is an American credit union based in Tukwila, Washington, in the Seattle metropolitan area. The credit union was founded as the Fellowship Credit Union on December 7, 1935, by a group of Boeing employees and originally served employees of the company; it was renamed in 1949. As of March 2025, the credit union has 66 locations—primarily in the Puget Sound region of Western Washington—and 1.5 million members making it the largest credit union in Washington and fifth largest in the United States.

Originally, BECU was only open to current Boeing employees; they were required to close their BECU accounts once they left the company. This also reflected on its shareholders; it had 49,280 shareholders in 1962, with all of them Boeing employees. As this left the credit union vulnerable to employment downturns at Boeing, it began expanding its membership field in 1968, when retirees were allowed to keep their accounts; membership was extended to immediate family members of current Boeing workers in 1973, while former employees were allowed to retain their accounts in 1977. BECU expanded its definition of eligible family members and the privileges they enjoyed in the early 1980s; by 1997, it had also opened membership to employees of the Museum of Flight. In 2002, membership was opened to those who live, work, or go to school in Washington state or certain Oregon or Idaho counties, leading the credit union to discontinue regular use of its full name. As of December 2024, BECU had over $29.4 billion in assets and over 1.5 million members. Beverly Anderson is the current president and CEO.

On November 2, 2017, BECU changed its logo, replacing the 'cursive E' logo that had been used by the organization since the late 1980s, with a sans-serif logo.

In November 2025, it was announced that BECU will merge with SAFE Credit Union, headquartered in Folsom, California. The two credit unions will operate independently before fully combining by January 2027.

== Locations ==
BECU has over 60 locations throughout the Puget Sound region, three locations in Spokane, and two branches in North Charleston, South Carolina.
