= Vista del Lago High School (Folsom, California) =

Public school in Folsom, California, United States

Location
- 1970 Broadstone Pkwy; Folsom, California 95630; United States; 38.65607°N 121.10643°W

Information
- Type: Public
- Established: 2007
- School district: Folsom Cordova Unified School District
- Principal: Kimberly Moore
- Teaching staff: 71.75 (FTE)
- Grades: 9–12
- Age range: 14-18
- Enrollment: 1750 (2023-2024)
- Student to teacher ratio: 24.39
- Campus type: Suburban
- Colors: Navy and silver
- Mascot: Eagle
- USNWR ranking: 244
- National ranking: 1371
- Yearbook: The Talon
- Website: Vista Del Lago High School

Vista Del Lago High School is a high school located in Folsom, California. It is one of five high schools in the Folsom Cordova Unified School District. The school opened in 2007 to serve the eastern side of Folsom and to relieve overcrowding at Folsom High School. The official school colors are navy blue and silver. It is one of the only schools in the Folsom Cordova Unified School District to use block scheduling. The mascot is the eagle. Vista del Lago's first class graduated in May 2010.

The 2009-10 school year was the first to include all grade levels (9-12). The prior year's (2008–09) enrollment was 951 students, with grades 9-11. The 2007-08 school year included only grades 9 and 10.

== Academics ==
Vista del Lago is known for its high academic standards. Since 2009 its Academic Performance Index was 845. That score makes Vista the frontrunner out of all the high schools in the area. In addition, it has a variety of extracurricular academic clubs, such as Math Club, Science Olympiad, Quiz Bowl, and Science Bowl, and performs well at the Regional Science Bowl. In addition, Vista has won several awards at Academic Decathlon competitions, such as consistently winning 2nd place overall at the Sacramento County regional competition and progressing to the California state competition.

== Demographics ==
By race, 2023-2024
Race/Ethnicity	Number of Students	Percentage
Total	1,750	100%
White	878	50.17%
Asian	565	32.29%
Hispanic	182	10.4%
Two or More Races	94	5.37%
Black	21	1.2%
American Indian/Alaska Native	5	0.29%
Native Hawaiian/Pacific Islander	5	0.29%

By gender, 2023-2024
Gender	Number of Students	Percentage
Total	1750	100%
Male	892	50.97%
Female	858	49.03%

By grade, 2023-2024
Grade	Number of Students	Percentage
Total	1750	100%
Freshman	428	24.46%
Sophomore	453	25.89%
Junior	404	23.09%
Senior	465	26.57%

== Athletics ==
Vista del Lago currently is a member of the Capital Athletic League. This conference is part of the CIF Sac-Joaquin Section, and the Eagles are currently a Division II school. Since joining the SVC in 2007, the Eagles have won all of the section and league titles. Fall sports include: Football, Cheer, Cross Country, Girls Golf, Girls Tennis, Flag Football, and Girls Volleyball. Winter sports include: Basketball, Soccer, and Wrestling. Spring Sports include: Lacrosse, Track & Field, Stunt, Swimming, Boys Golf, Boys Volleyball, Baseball, Softball, and Boys Tennis. All sports programs allow for student participation grade level 9-12.
