= Folsom Lake College =

Public community college in Folsom, California

Coordinates: 38.66153°N 121.12738°W

- Type: Public community college
- Established: 2004
- Parent institution: Los Rios Community College District
- President: Artemio Pimentel
- Students: 11,848 (Fall 2025)
- Location: Folsom, California, United States
- Colors: Teal, Black
- Nickname: Falcons
- Website: www.flc.losrios.edu/

Folsom Lake College (FLC) is a public community college in Folsom, California. It is part of California Community Colleges system and the Los Rios Community College District. Folsom Lake College serves the community with classes offered at its main Folsom campus at 10 College Parkway, two outreach centers (the El Dorado Center in Placerville and the Rancho Cordova Center), and various off-site locations nearby. As of Fall 2005, Folsom Lake College enrolled approximately 6,600 students choosing among approximately 1,000 different course offerings. Those students were served by 74 full-time faculty, including 9 counselors, 180 part-time faculty, 69 classified staff, and eight administrators. The college offers students over 30 different Associate of Arts or Science degree options, as well as over 30 certificate alternatives. The college's mascot is the Falcons and its colors are teal and black. The current president is Art Pimental who began in 2022.

== History ==
In 1965, the Los Rios Community College District was established with American River College and Sacramento City College as its two colleges. A year later, in 1966, the Placerville Center opened on the National Guard Armory in Placerville as a center of American River College and served approximately 200 students.

In 1977, the Placerville Center relocated to a hill behind a Raley's supermarket. Hence, it was known as the "University Behind Raley's" by the community. In 1985, operations of the Placerville Center were transferred to Cosumnes River College, which opened in 1970. In 1994, the Placerville Center's permanent buildings opened on Campus Drive off Green Valley Road and the center was renamed the El Dorado Center.

In 1989, the Mather Center opened in Rancho Cordova on the site of the Mather Field Air Base. It was owned by American River College. In 1993, the Folsom Lake Center opened on the site of what would become Folsom Lake College, combining the Mather Center and another center at Folsom High School, and was operated by Cosumnes River College.

In 2000, the Rancho Cordova Center opened on Rockingham Drive in Rancho Cordova.

In 2001, Folsom Lake College's first permanent building, Aspen Hall, opened.

On January 9, 2004, Folsom Lake College received initial accreditation from the Accrediting Commission for Community and Junior Colleges of the Western Association of Schools and Colleges. Accreditation certifies to students and the community that an educational institution meets or exceeds specific standards of quality. Folsom Center combined with the existing El Dorado and Rancho Cordova Centers to form Folsom Lake College.

In Fall 2005, Aspen Hall was expanded to include a library, a community room, and a student services center. In the same year, Cypress Hall and Buckeye Hall opened. Cypress Hall consists of science and art labs, a reading and writing center, and a tutoring center, and Buckeye Hall consists of a large university-style lecture room that seats 150 people. In addition, El Dorado Center opened another building which houses the English, tutoring, and community centers there.

In 2006, the Falcon's Roost opened on the Folsom campus. This building consists of a cafeteria, a bookstore, a coffee shop, the college police office, and the career and transfer services center.

In 2007, two more buildings, Dogwood Hall and Lilac Hall, were constructed on the campus. In 2008, the Community Observatory opened on the El Dorado Center.

In 2009, the physical education building opened.

In 2011, the Folsom Lake College Visual and Performing Arts Center, Harris Center, opened to the public. The center includes an 850-seat main theater, a 200-seat city stage, and a 100-seat recital hall. The center cost approximately $42.3 million. The majority, $38 million, came from state and district bonds. $4.3 came from a district capital campaign. The Folsom City Council contributed $500,000 to FLC in exchange for the right to name the 200-seat studio theater.

In 2013, the athletic complex expanded to include a soccer field, baseball and softball stadiums, tennis courts, a track and field complex, and a cross country course. The portable buildings on the main Folsom campus were demolished and replaced with a gymnasium, which opened in 2015.

In 2015, one of the buildings in the El Dorado Center expanded to include a student lounge, a club room, a multi-purpose room, and more office space. In October that year, the Rancho Cordova Center relocated to its current site on Folsom Blvd.

In the spring of 2018, the innovation center got renovated and reopened as a makerspace.

In 2010, FLC began its own athletic program. Men's and women's golf and tennis began in spring 2010. Women's soccer was added in fall 2013, followed by men's soccer in fall 2014, men's baseball in spring 2015, women's softball in spring 2016, women's volleyball in fall 2016, and men's and women's basketball in fall 2017.

== Alumni ==
- Aspen Ladd, professional Mixed Martial Artist, current UFC Bantamweight

== See also ==
- Community Observatory
