= Windsor Propeller =

American manufacturer of aircraft parts

- Company type: Private
- Industry: Hobby products
- Founded: 1978
- Founder: Fred Jamieson
- Headquarters: Rancho Cordova, California
- Products: Propellers for RC model aircraft
- Brands: Master Airscrew
- Website: www.masterairscrew.com

Windsor Propeller is an American manufacturer of propellers and accessories for hobby model aircraft and unmanned aerial vehicles (UAVs). Founded in 1978 in Windsor, Northern California by Fred Jamieson, the company is developing and manufacturing its products under the brand name Master Airscrew. The company is now headquartered in Rancho Cordova, California, selling its products worldwide.

== History ==
Fred Jamieson started the Windsor Propeller Company in 1978. He got interested in modelling by his family. His great grand parents opened the first toy store in San Francisco. Before starting Windsor Propeller Company, Fred worked in aviation as a Navy test pilot, commercial airline pilot, helicopter test pilot, crop-duster and a private aviation pilot. He was also a drag racer and sports cars enthusiast. Fred Jamieson began building and flying hobby aircraft in the 1960s and turned to propeller design in the 1970s by carving by hand propellers from maple wood blocks.

The first products under the Master Airscrew brand were produced in 1976. Fred started making 1/2A propellers and sending them to hobby shops, and in 1980 the company started selling fiberglass-filled propellers. The growth of the company began and 2 years later the company had 15 propellers. The designs were made by Fred himself, first by hand and later by specialized computer software. Today the company has more than 250 different styles and sizes of propellers and sells Master Airscrew products on six continents.

== Products ==
The different propellers manufactured by Windsor Propeller are divided into the following series of products:

- GF Series for sport flying
- K Series for 4-stroke engines
- 3 blade Series for glow and gas engines
- Classic Series for big engines and World War I/II look to them
- S2 Series – Scimitar for higher performance
- Electric Only Series with thin undercambered blades
- Formula One Series inspired by 50s racing cars
- Wood Series (made from maple or beach wood)
