= Geoff Jenkins =

American baseball player (born 1974)

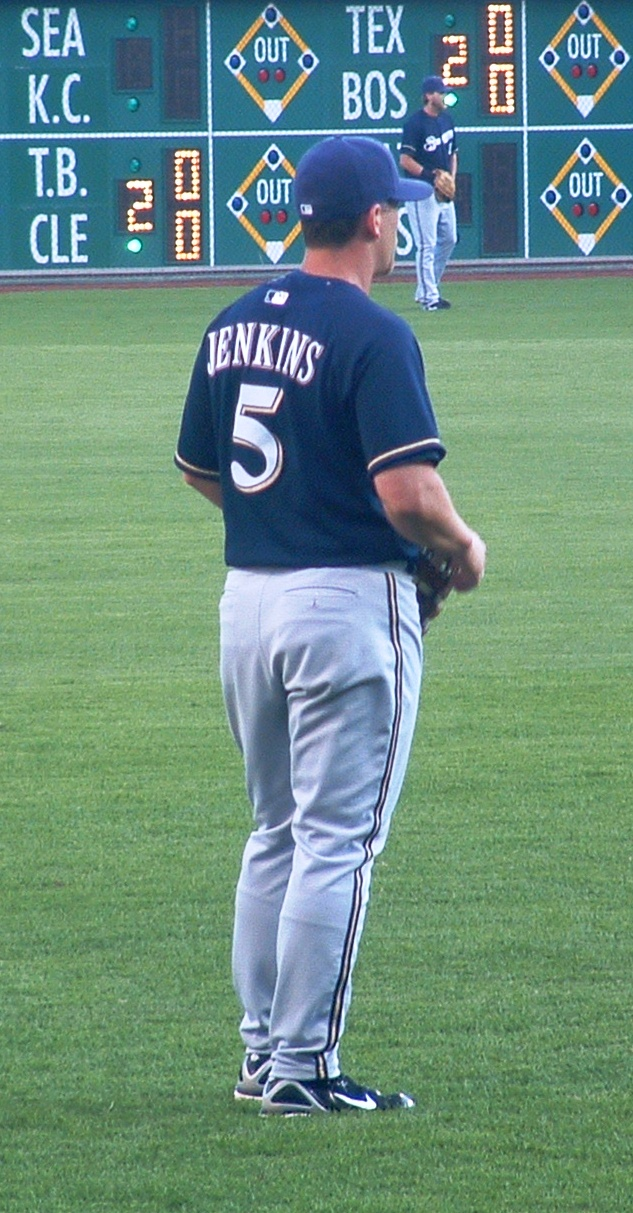
- Jenkins with the Milwaukee Brewers
- Outfielder
- Born: July 21, 1974 (age 51); Olympia, Washington, U.S.
- Batted: Left Threw: Right

MLB debut
- April 24, 1998, for the Milwaukee Brewers

Last MLB appearance
- September 28, 2008, for the Philadelphia Phillies

MLB statistics
- Batting average: .275
- Home runs: 221
- Runs batted in: 733
- Stats at Baseball Reference

Teams
- Milwaukee Brewers (1998–2007); Philadelphia Phillies (2008)

Career highlights and awards
- All-Star (2003); World Series champion (2008); Milwaukee Brewers Wall of Honor; American Family Field Walk of Fame

Geoffrey Scott Jenkins (born July 21, 1974) is an American former professional baseball outfielder, who played in Major League Baseball (MLB) for the Milwaukee Brewers (1998–2007) and Philadelphia Phillies (2008). He is fourth on the Brewers’ all-time career home run list, trailing only Hall-of-Famer Robin Yount, 2011 National League (NL) MVP Ryan Braun, and former All-Star first baseman Prince Fielder. Following his playing career, Jenkins was on the coaching staff of the 2013 Peoria Explorers of the now-defunct Independent Freedom Pro Baseball League.

== Amateur career ==
Jenkins attended Cordova High School in Rancho Cordova, California, where he played football, basketball, and baseball. He was selected for the all-state baseball team as a junior and senior before graduating in 1992.

Jenkins enrolled at the University of Southern California (USC) and played college baseball for the USC Trojans from 1993 to 1995. In his final season, he batted .399 with 78 runs batted in (RBIs) and a .748 slugging percentage in 70 games, also scoring 75 runs to tie the school record held by Rich Dauer and Mark McGwire; his 23 home runs and 193 total bases ranked second in school history behind McGwire's 1984 totals of 32 and 216. He led the Trojans to the College World Series, where they reached the championship game; Jenkins was named to the all-CWS team, and also earned team co-MVP honors and was named a consensus All-American. In 1996, the year of the CWS' 50th tournament, Jenkins was named to the all-decade team for the 1990s. He finished his USC career with a .369 batting average, 45 home runs (second only to McGwire's 54), a .652 slugging percentage, 180 runs, and school records for runs batted in (175) and total bases (444).

== Professional career ==
=== Minor leagues ===
Jenkins was drafted by the Milwaukee Brewers in the first round (9th overall) in the 1995 Major League Baseball draft. He spent the 1995–1997 seasons within the Milwaukee farm system, and began the 1998 season in the minor leagues.

=== Milwaukee Brewers ===
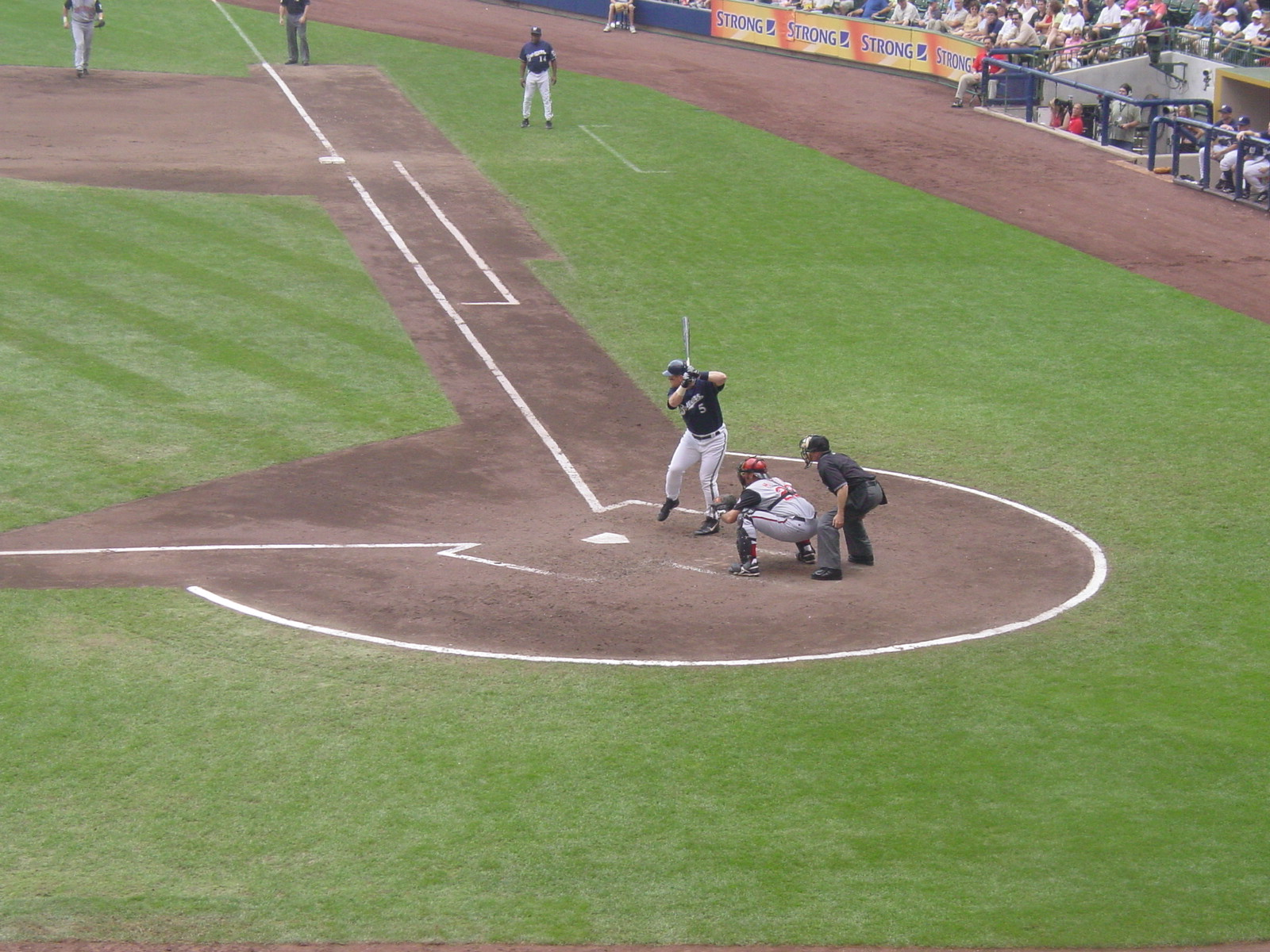
Jenkins at the plate against the Cincinnati Reds during the 2004 season

Jenkins made his major league debut on April 24, 1998, and he singled off Orel Hershiser in his first career plate appearance and hit a fifth-inning home run off Hershiser in his third career plate appearance. On September 23 of that same year, in the midst of a tense Wild Card race, Jenkins hit the routine fly ball that Brant Brown of the Chicago Cubs dropped allowing three runs to score and the Brewers to win. Jenkins would go on to bat over .300 in his 2nd and 3rd seasons, driving in 90 or more runs three times for one of the perennially weaker teams in the league.

In 2000, he was the Brewers' team MVP. He led the Brewers in batting average (.303) and home runs (34). His 2002 season was cut short when on June 17 in a game against the Houston Astros he suffered a horrific-looking dislocated ankle when sliding into third base feet first during a game. He was safe on the play. He was selected to the National League's All-Star team in 2003 via the MLB's All-Star Final Vote contest where a player is selected from both leagues by fans to join their respective team after the initial roster is announced.

On June 8, 2004, he became the 8th player in Major League history to strike out six times in a single game. After playing in left field for virtually his entire career, he moved to right field for the 2005 and 2006 seasons when Milwaukee acquired Carlos Lee.

In 2006, Jenkins experienced a prolonged offensive slump, struggling in particular against left-handed pitching. In August 2006, the Brewers benched Jenkins, one of their highest-paid players at the time, in favor of the younger Corey Hart.

In 2007, Jenkins returned to left field to platoon with Kevin Mench. On October 30, 2007, the Brewers officially declined their $9 million option on Jenkins' contract, making him a free agent for the 2008 season.

=== Philadelphia Phillies ===
On December 20, 2007, Jenkins signed a two-year, $13 million deal with a vesting option for 2010 with the Philadelphia Phillies. He returned to Miller Park in a Phillies uniform on April 23, 2008, to a crowd of just over 30,000. Jenkins was welcomed back with a tribute video, highlighting his ten-year career with the Brewers, and the standing ovation that followed. He received a second ovation while leading off the second inning. Philadelphia would go on to lose the game, 5–4. Jenkins went 0 for 3, with a walk and a stolen base. In the postseason, his only hit came on a leadoff double in the bottom of the 6th inning of Game 5 of the 2008 World Series. Jenkins‘ hit set the tone for the finale of the World Series as the Phillies won the World Series and earned Jenkins the first and only World Series ring of his 11-year career.

Jenkins was released by the Phillies at the end of spring training on March 31, 2009.

=== Retirement ===
On July 9, 2010, Jenkins retired from baseball as a Milwaukee Brewer.

== After baseball ==
Jenkins has been a franchise partner in Phoenix-area F45 Training Centers since March 2, 2019.

== See also ==
- List of Major League Baseball career home run leaders
