= Walnutwood High School =

Alternative school in Rancho Cordova, California, United States

Location
- 10850 Gadsten Way; Rancho Cordova, California 95670; United States; 38°36′25.9″N 121°16′46.4″W

Information
- Type: Alternative School
- Established: 1980
- School district: Folsom-Cordova Unified School District
- Principal: Annie Conover
- Teaching staff: 11.66 (FTE)
- Grades: K to 12
- Enrollment: 169 (2023-2024)
- Student to teacher ratio: 14.49
- Color: Blue
- Nickname: Pathfinders
- Website: www.fcusd.org/whs

Walnutwood High School is an alternative school of choice (grades K-12) located in Rancho Cordova, Sacramento County, California, United States.

== School History ==
Walnutwood High School is an independent study school. The school opened at the former campus of Walnutwood Elementary School in 1989.
