= Johnny Cash Trail =

Public trail in Folsom, California

Coordinates: 38.6824°N 121.1688°W

- Length: 2.5 miles
- Location: Folsom, California, United States
- Established: October 2017
- Trailheads: American River Trail, Historic Folsom District
- Use: Hiking, biking
- Elevation gain/loss: Minimal
- Sights: Folsom State Prison, American River, Folsom Lake
- Hazards: None significant
- Surface: Asphalt
- Maintainer: City of Folsom
- Website: folsomcasharttrail.com

The Johnny Cash Trail is a popular biking and hiking trail located in Folsom, California. It is 2.5 miles long and runs along the American River and Folsom Lake. It was opened in October of 2017 and consists of several pieces of art dedicated to the famous singer, Johnny Cash. It is popular amongst bikers and families who want to enjoy the scenery and nature of the trail.

== History ==
The Johnny Cash Trail is a bike trail located in Folsom, California. It is named after the famous singer Johnny Cash. The trail is located by the Folsom Prison where Cash performed his hit song “Folsom Prison Blues” on January 13, 1968. The trail itself used to be a mode of automotive transportation in the 1800s. The trail connects to the American River Trail and the trail leading to the Historic Folsom District. The Johnny Cash Trail was repaved in the 1970s and officially opened in October 2017. It is used by cyclists, runners, and families who want to enjoy nature and artwork along the trail.

== Artwork ==
Several pieces of artwork throughout the trail are inspired by Johnny Cash’s performance at the Folsom Prison. It has greatly affected the number of people who travel down the trail. People like to spend their time out on the trail with their families and friends admiring the artwork and learning about the history of the trail, including Robber’s Ravine.

In 2024, a new sculpture was created called "Cash's Pick No. 1". It is the shape of a guitar pick and stands at 7 feet tall.
