= Sacramento New Technology High School =

Charter school in South Sacramento, California

Coordinates: 38°31′7″N 121°30′14″W

Sacramento New Technology Early College High School (originally established as Sacramento New Technology High School) is a small charter school based on the rings of New Tech Network's New Technology High Schools. It is part of the Sacramento City Unified School District and is located in South Sacramento.

== History ==
Sacramento New Technology High School was established in 2003 on the site of Thurgood Marshall High School, an alternative high school during the 1990s. Prior to Thurgood Marshall, the site was home to Argonaut Alternative High School during the 1980s.

== Affiliation ==
The school is a New Tech Network (NTN) school. NTN is an organization that helps public schools implement the "New Tech Model", which is based on three primary elements:

- Project-based learning (PBL): Teachers facilitate collaborative methods of learning.
- Student-directed culture: Students decide how to allocate their time and team roles, as opposed to a traditional school setting with teacher-led time management.
- Technology integration: The school maintains a one-to-one computer-to-student ratio. Students and faculty use an online platform to share projects, collaborate, communicate, and conduct research.

== The School and Curriculum ==
To support its project-based learning model, Sacramento New Technology Early College High School operates on a 1-to-1 technology ratio, with every student issued a personal Chromebook for academic use.

The school's curriculum expands beyond conventional high school math, language, and social science courses to offer specialized digital media and technology courses.
