= Cordova High School (California) =

Public high school in Rancho Cordova, California

Location
- 2239 Chase Drive; Rancho Cordova, California 95670; United States; 38°36′2″N 121°18′27″W

Information
- Type: Public high school
- Established: 1963; 63 years ago
- School district: Folsom Cordova Unified School District
- CEEB code: 052553
- NCES School ID: 061389001568
- Principal: Amy Strawn
- Teaching staff: 104.04 (on an FTE basis)
- Grades: 9–12
- Enrollment: 1,944 (2024–2025)
- Student to teacher ratio: 18.69
- Colors: Red and Black
- Nickname: Lancers
- Yearbook: Lancer Legends
- Website: chs.fcusd.org

Cordova High School is a comprehensive public high school in Rancho Cordova, California. It is one of five high schools in Folsom Cordova Unified School District.

The school opened in 1963 with the first graduating class in 1965. Prior to opening, students in Rancho Cordova attended Folsom High School.

== Enrollment ==
As of the 2024–25 school year, the school had an enrollment of 1,944 students and 104.04 classroom teachers (on an FTE basis), for a student–teacher ratio of 18.69. Fifteen percent of Cordova High students are involved in special education, twenty-two percent qualify for English language learner support, and seventy percent qualify for free or reduced-price lunch. For 2021-22, Cordova High School was a Title I school.

Student body composition as of 2024–2025
Race and ethnicity	Total
American Indian/Alaska Native	0.2%
Asian	10.8%
Black	8.4%
Filipino	2.4%
Hispanic	38.3%
Native Hawaiian/Pacific Islander	1.7%
Two or more Races	11.8%
White	26.3%

For 2021-22, Cordova High School was a Title I school.

== Notable alumni ==
- Zack Andrews – American professional basketball player
- Chris Bosio – American baseball player and coach (born 1963)
- Coye Francies – American football player (born 1986)
- Lester Holt – American journalist and news anchor (born 1959)
- Ben Huh – South Korean-American businessman
- Geoff Jenkins – American baseball player (born 1974)
- Randy Lerch – American baseball player (born 1954)
- Jerry Manuel – American baseball player, coach and manager (born 1953)
- Robert Rozier – US murderer and gridiron-football player (born 1955)
- Troy Taylor – American football player and coach (born 1968)
- Max Venable – American baseball player (born 1957)
- Seneca Wallace – American football player (born 1980)
