= George Washington Carver School of Arts and Sciences =

Location
- 10101 Systems Parkway; Rancho Cordova, California; U.S. 38°33′53″N 121°19′0″W

Information
- Type: Public
- Teaching staff: 13.10 (FTE)
- Enrollment: 178 (2023-2024)
- Student to teacher ratio: 13.59
- Website: gwc.scusd.edu

George Washington Carver High School of Arts and Sciences is a public charter school in Rancho Cordova, California. It is one of only three public Waldorf High Schools in the United States.

== History ==
Carver was founded in 2008. It is part of the Sacramento City Unified School District. It uses the Waldorf holistic system of education, one of only three public high schools in the United States to do so. Waldorf Education is a three tiered system consisting of using the head for critical thinking, the heart for creative expression, and the hands for wholesome action. It replaced America's Choice High School, which was funded by a grant from the Bill and Melinda Gates Foundation.

In 2014 the school had a 100% graduation rate for high school, elementary and low income groups.

The principal is LaNiecia Kobelt.

In 2018 U.S. News & World Report ranked Carver 516th in California and 2,630th nationwide. The math proficiency rating was 30th percentile, reading proficiency was 68th percentile.

In 2014 the Sacramento Gun Club opened a shooting range 250 feet from the school.
