= Rancho Cordova Grapevine-Independent =

Rancho Cordova Grapevine Independent
- Type: Weekly newspaper
- Format: Broadsheet
- Owner(s): Messenger Publishing Group
- Publisher: Paul Scholl
- Editor: Paul Scholl
- Founded: 1968
- Language: English
- Headquarters: 7144 Fair Oaks Blvd Suite #5 | Carmichael, CA 95608
- OCLC number: 31217426
- Website: ranchocordovaindependent.com

The Rancho Cordova Grapevine-Independent, formerly the Rancho Cordova Grapevine, is a weekly newspaper in Rancho Cordova, California (a suburb east of Sacramento). The publication has operated continuously since 1968.

== History ==
The first issue of the Rancho Cordova Grapevine was published on April 11, 1968. Its first editor was Gene Eldon. The paper was named for the vineyards that once dominated the area. Rosemary Malich was a co-owner for a few years in the early to mid '70s. Paul and Dorothy Hronek sold the paper to Robert and Jane Mingori.

The paper's name was changed to the Grapevine-Independent starting with the August 8, 1979 edition. That same year editor Doug Hawkes bought the paper from Lin Corey and became publisher. Hawkes sold it in 1989. The new owner was Robert Ling. He published the paper until selling out to Herburger Publications, Inc. in 2003. The company sold the paper to Kris Middaugh, who in turn sold it to Paul Scholl of Messenger Publishing Group in 2013.
