= SAFE Credit Union =

American state-chartered credit union

- Formerly: Sacramento Air Depot Federal Credit Union
- Company type: Credit Union
- Industry: Financial services
- Founded: 1940; 86 years ago
- Founder: Employees at the Sacramento Air Depot
- Headquarters: Folsom, California, United States
- Number of locations: 20 branches (2022)
- Area served: Sacramento
- Key people: Faye Nabhani (President/CEO)
- Products: Savings, checking, consumer loans, mortgage loans, credit cards, online banking, investments, insurance
- Total assets: US$4.5bn (2022)
- Number of employees: 773 (2022)
- Website: www.safecu.org

SAFE Credit Union is an American state-chartered credit union headquartered in Folsom, California. It has 20 branches in the Greater Sacramento area. As of 2023, it was the second-largest credit union in the Sacramento area with $4.52 billion in assets.

== History ==
The credit union was founded in 1940 as the Sacramento Air Depot Federal Credit Union and originally served employees at the Sacramento Air Depot. By 1998, their members voted to convert to a state charter that changed the name to what it is today.

In 2007, the credit union acquired Capital Power Credit Union, founded in 1954, and rebranded its one location, retaining the staff.

In 2009, the credit union announced a merger with Rancho Cordova-based American River HealthPro Credit Union which resulted in the closure of three of the four American River HealthPro credit union branches, and the rebranding of the fourth branch as a SAFE Credit Union branch.

In 2019, the credit union acquired a 25-year naming rights deal for the area's convention center and performing arts district.

In 2023, Faye Nabhani became the first female president & CEO of the credit union.

In 2025, it was announced that SAFE Credit Union will merge with BECU, headquartered in Tukwila, Washington. The two credit unions will operate independently before fully combining by early 2027
