= Community Observatory =

Observatory in California, US

Coordinates: 38°43′36″N 120°52′05″W

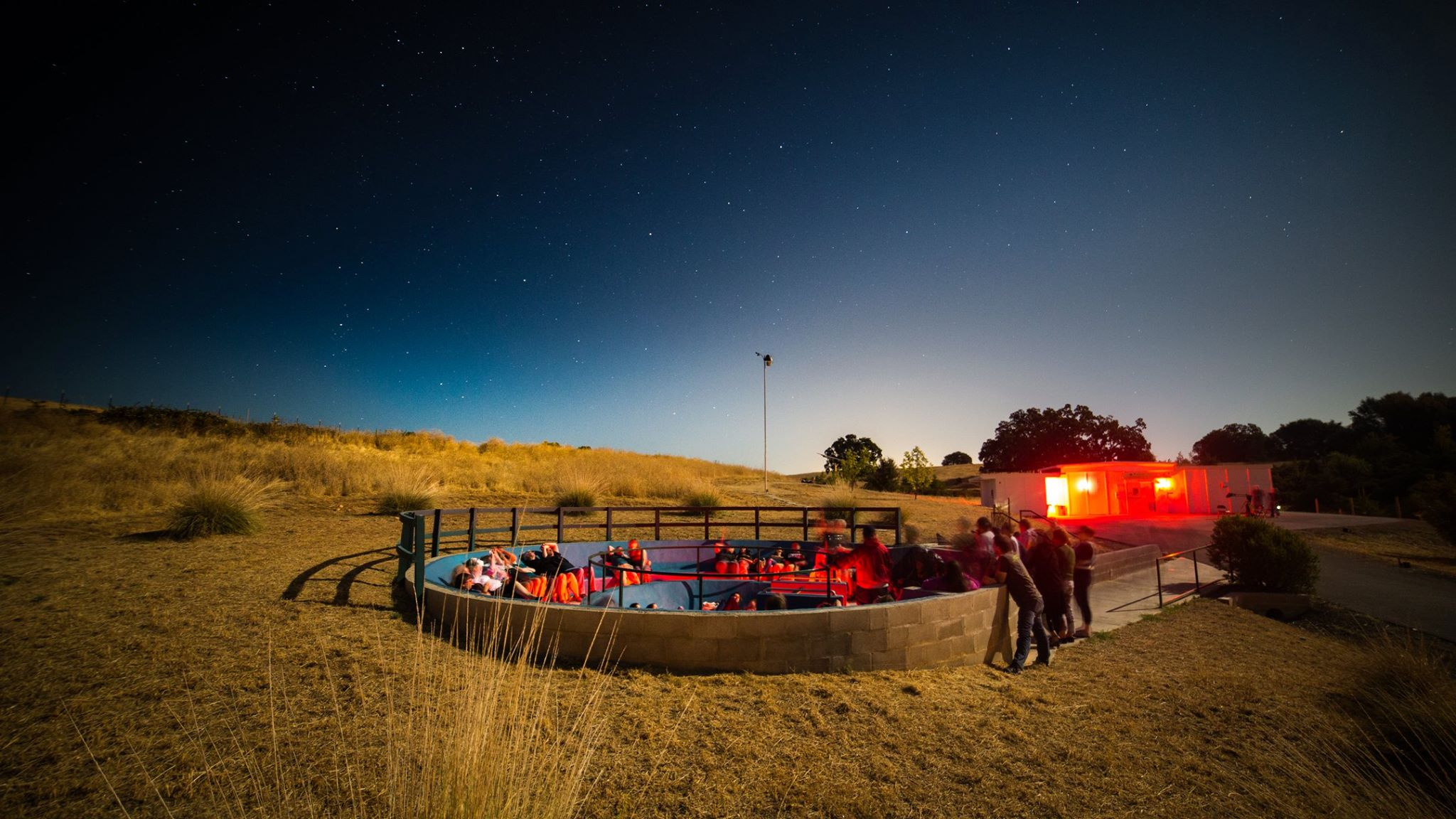
Art Cort Sky Theater

The Community Observatory is a public outreach observatory located in Placerville, California, on the campus of the El Dorado Learning Center. The Community Observatory was established in 2006 through the work of the Rotarians of Cameron Park as free family-friendly park for the community. It is operated by a partnership of a team of volunteers, Folsom Lake College, the El Dorado County Office of Education and the Rotarians of Cameron Park.

In 2011, the Rotarians of Cameron Park installed the Art Cort Sky Theater as a place for visitors to rest and gaze at the stars. Their volunteers are often found providing tours of the constellations.

As of 2017, two telescopes are permanently mounted in the observatory: one 17-inch Planewave CDK and one 14-inch Celestron SCT, modified to accommodate a Hyperstar optic system fitted with an Atik Infinity Camera.

As of 2017, the Community Observatory had received over 80,000 visitors. Hours can be found through its website, its Facebook page.

Acting as docents are volunteers with an interest in astronomy who donate their time and knowledge to make a visit to the observatory educational. They can provide information about celestial objects, the observatory facility, and telescopes.

== See also ==
- List of astronomical observatories
