= Kinney High School =

Coordinates: 38.6012°N 121.2755°W

Location
- 2710 Kilgore Road; Rancho Cordova, California 95670

Information
- School district: Folsom Cordova Unified School District
- NCES District ID: 01573
- Principal: Dana Carrigan
- Teaching staff: 10.20 (FTE)
- Grades: 9-12
- Enrollment: 114 (2023-2024)
- Student to teacher ratio: 11.18
- Website: Kinney High School Website

Kinney High School is a public high school (grades 9–12) located in Rancho Cordova, California.

== School History ==
Kinney High opened in 1966 in an old abandoned school building. The entire school was replaced in 1971 and the original building was demolished.
