= Folsom Cordova Unified School District =

School district affiliated with Folsom and Rancho Cordova, California

Folsom Cordova Unified School

Address
- 1965 Birkmont Drive Rancho Cordova, California, 95742; United States

District information
- Type: Public
- Grades: TK–12
- Established: 1949
- Superintendent: Erik Swanson
- Schools: 35
- NCES District ID: 0613890

Students and staff
- Students: 21,630 (2024-25)
- Teachers: 911.19 (FTE)
- Staff: 1,000.47 (FTE)
- Student–teacher ratio: 22.05:1

Other information
- Website: www.fcusd.org

Folsom Cordova Unified School District (FCUSD) is a school district headquartered in Rancho Cordova, California. It covers the cities of Folsom, Rancho Cordova, and most of Mather. There are 36 separate schools, including adult education and independent study programs. There are four high schools, four middle schools, twenty-one elementary schools, and five alternative schools.

== History ==
The Folsom Cordova Unified School District was created in 1949 when the Folsom Union High School District joined with the Granite Grammar School District. The new School District was called the Folsom Cordova Joint School District and there were a total of 767 students enrolled at only two school sites which were Granite Elementary School at 909 Mormon Street and Folsom High School at 715 Riley Street in Folsom. In June 1967 the school district was renamed the Folsom Cordova Unified School District. Kitty Hawk and Mather Heights School were located on Mather Air Force Base until that facility closed down in 1993. The after-school Student Care Program started in 1986. The Adolescent Parent Program began in 1985. The school district office was located at 125 East Bidwell Street from 1963 to 2012. (Today that property is the location of an apartment complex.)

The Folsom Cordova Unified School District tried year-round education beginning with the opening of Folsom Hills Elementary School in 1991. Folsom Hills was placed on a single track 60/20 schedule for the 1991–92 school year. All the students and staff were at school for sixty days and then off track for twenty days. Starting in the 1992–93 school year, Carl Sundahl, Folsom Hills and Oak Chan Elementary Schools went on a three-track year-round schedule. Folsom Middle School also began a year-round schedule that same school year however it was a four-track schedule meaning there were students and staff present nearly every day of the year at the middle school. Folsom High never utilized the year-round schedule nor did any schools in Rancho Cordova. By 1998, all schools in the Folsom Cordova Unified School District had reverted to the traditional school schedule and year-round education came to an end.

From 1939 to 1984 the Folsom Union High School District and then the Folsom Cordova Unified School District operated a school at Represa inside Folsom State Prison. The school taught academic and vocational subjects to the prisoners. Numerous high school diplomas were awarded at the prison school. The Federal Government took over control of that school in 1984.

== Superintendents ==
#	Service	Name	Years (approx.)	Ref.
1	1949 - 1965	W.E. Mitchell	16	
2	1965 - 1978	Howard C. Wood	13	
3	1978 - 1987	Dr. James Loughridge	9	
4	1987 - 1990	David Benson	3	
5	1990 - 1993	Virgil Jenson	3	
6	1993 - 1996	Dr. Caroline Gonzales	3	
7	1997 - 1999	Dr. Joe Spaulding	2	
8	1999 - June 30, 2005	Norman Siefkin	6	
9	July 1, 2005 - June 30, 2010	Patrick Godwin	5	
10	July 1, 2010 - June 30, 2017	Deborah Bettencourt	7	
11	July 1, 2017 - June 30, 2024	Dr. Sarah Koligian	7	
12	July 1, 2024 – Present	Erik Swanson	2	

== Enrollment ==
Year	Enrollment
1949	767
1958	3,732
1968	11,822
1978	10,549
1982	10,023
1990	12,656
2000	16,277
2010	18,893
2020	20,096
2021	20,344
2022	20,550
2023	20,828
2024	21,630

== Schools ==
=== High schools ===
- Cordova High School (Opened in 1963)
- Folsom High School (Opened in 1922; new campus opened in 1998)
- Kinney High School (Opened in 1966)
- Vista del Lago High School (Opened in 2007)

=== Middle schools ===
- Folsom Middle School (Opened in 1968)
- Mills Middle School (Opened in 1958)
- Sutter Middle School (Opened in 2000; former Folsom High location)
- W.E. Mitchell Middle School (Opened in 1965)

=== Elementary schools ===
- Alder Creek Elementary School (Opened in 2024)
- Blanche Sprentz Elementary School (Opened in 1966)
- Carl H. Sundahl Elementary School (Opened in 1987)
- Cordova Gardens Elementary School (Opened in 1959)
- Cordova Meadows Elementary School (Opened in 1966)
- Cordova Villa Elementary School (Opened in 1964)
- Empire Oaks Elementary School (Opened 2001)
- Folsom Hills Elementary School (Opened in 1991)
- Gold Ridge Elementary School (Opened in 1998)
- Mather Heights Elementary School (Opened in 1953)
- Mangini Ranch Elementary School (Opened in 2021)
- Natoma Station Elementary School (Opened in 1995)
- Navigator Elementary School (Opened in 2006)
- Oak Chan Elementary School (Opened in 1989)
- Peter J. Shields Elementary School (Opened in 1962)
- Rancho Cordova Elementary School (Opened in 1956)
- Riverview STEM Academy (Opened in 2014)
- Russell Ranch Elementary School (Opened in 2007)
- Sandra J. Gallardo Elementary School (Opened in 2003)
- Theodore Judah Elementary School (Opened in 1951)
- White Rock Elementary School (Opened in 1961)
- Williamson Elementary School (Opened in 1963)

=== Alternative schools ===
- Community Education Center, Adult Education and Adolescent Parent Program
- Cordova Lane Center, Preschool/Family Programs
- Folsom Cordova Community Charter School, Kitty Hawk Campus
- Innovations Academy, K-12 Online (Opened in 2021)
- Walnutwood High School, an online independent study school

=== Closed Or Repurposed Facilities ===
- Cordova Lane Elementary School (Opened in 1960, school closed in 2010 and transformed to Cordova Lane Center)
- Folsom Lake High School at 955 Riley Street in Folsom (Opened in 2000, school relocated in 2020 to Folsom High Campus and buildings on Riley Street removed in 2021); school closed in June 2026
- Granite School at 909 Mormon Street in Folsom (Opened in 1915, closed in 1966, transformed to an administration building and property sold in 2021)
- Kitty Hawk Elementary School (Opened in 1962, school closed in 1989 and transformed to Folsom Cordova Community Charter School)
- Riverview Elementary School (Opened in 1965, school closed in 2010 and transformed into Riverview STEM Academy in 2014)
- Transportation/Warehouse Building at 701 Bidwell Street, Folsom (Constructed 1946 and property sold in 2015)
- Walnutwood Elementary School (Opened in 1965, school closed in 1989 and transformed to Community Education Center)

== School Board (since 2000) ==
The School Board went from "at-large" elections to "by district" elections in 2020.

District	Years	Name	Terms
2	2024 -	YK Chalamcherla	1
1	2022 -	Kara Lofthouse	1
5	2022 -	Jennifer Laret	1
2	2020 - 2024	Tim Hooey	1
1	2018 - 2022	Joshua Hoover	1
3	2018 -	David Reid	2
4	2016 -	Chris Clark	3
N/A	2014 - 2018	Sarah Aquino	1
N/A	2010 - 2018	Zak Ford	2
2	2008 - 2020	Joanne Reinking	3
N/A	2004 - 2008	Mary McCormick	1
N/A	2002 - 2014	Richard Shaw	3
5	2002 - 2022	Ed Short	5
N/A	1998 - 2002	Jim McGowan	1
N/A	1998 - 2006	Sara Myers	2
N/A	1996 - 2004; 2006 - 2010	Roger Benton	3
N/A	1996 - 2016	Teresa Stanley	5

== Notable teachers ==
- Pete Chilcutt, former NBA basketball player; sixth-grade math and science teacher at Folsom Middle School.
