= Mather, Sacramento County, California =

Mather
- census-designated place
- Position in California.
- Coordinates: 38°31′54″N 121°17′02″W
- Country: United States
- State: California
- County: Sacramento

Area
  - Total: 10.050 sq mi (26.029 km^{2})
  - Land: 10.025 sq mi (25.965 km^{2})
  - Water: 0.025 sq mi (0.065 km^{2}) 0.25%
- Elevation: 108 ft (33 m)

Population (2020)
  - Total: 4,698
  - Density: 468.6/sq mi (180.9/km^{2})
- Time zone: UTC-8 (Pacific (PST))
  - Summer (DST): UTC-7 (PDT)
- GNIS feature ID: 2583073

Mather (/ˈmeɪ.θər/ MAY-ther) is a census-designated place in Sacramento County, California, United States. Mather sits at an elevation of 108 feet (33 m). The 2020 United States census reported Mather's population was 4,698. It is the site of the former Mather Air Force Base, closed by the federal government in 1993.

== History ==
Following the closure of Mather Air Force Base under the Base Realignment and Closure Act of 1988, the United States Air Force leased a portion of the 5,717-acre facility to Sacramento County, California, for mixed-use redevelopment. Later, portions of the base were transferred to the Cordova Recreation and Park District. Over time, the redevelopment of former military land led to the Mather Commerce Center, a Veteran's Affairs Medical Center, sports complexes, and wetland reserves. It also led to business parks, industrial zones, and residential communities. In 2010, Mather received its designation as a census-designated place.

Sacramento Mather Airport reopened for civilian use on May 5, 1995 following the closure of Mather Field. Companies including UPS and DHL Express and moved its operations to the new airport. The airport also began to host the annual California Capital Airshow in 2006.

== Geography ==
According to the United States Census Bureau, the CDP covers an area of 10.0 square miles (26.0 km^{2}), of which 99.75% is land and 0.25% is water.

=== Climate ===
The climate of Mather is Mediterranean, characterized by hot, dry summers, at times exceeding 100 °F or 37.8 °C, and mild, rainy winters, with lows at night falling below freezing at times.

== Demographics ==
Historical population
Census	Pop.	Note	%±
2010	4,451		—
2020	4,698		5.5%
U.S. Decennial Census; 1850–1870 1880-1890; 1900 1910 1920; 1930 1940 1950; 1960 1970 1980; 1990 2000 2010

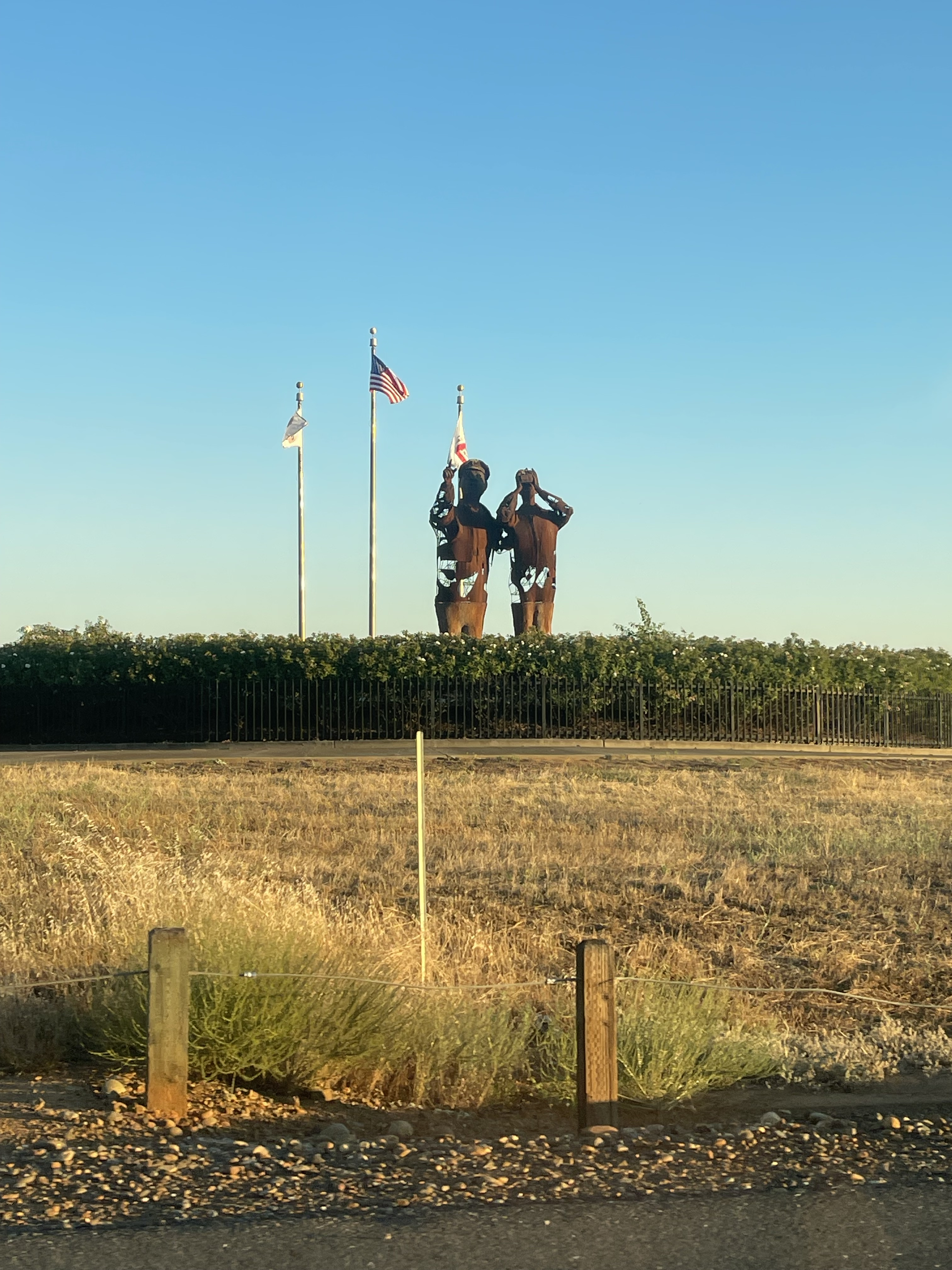
Mather Air Force Base Navigators Monument

Mather first appeared as a census designated place in the 2010 U.S. census formed from part of deleted Rancho Cordova CDP and additional area.

The 2020 United States census reported that Mather had a population of 4,698. The population density was 468.6 inhabitants per square mile (180.9/km^{2}). The racial makeup of Mather was 52.3% White, 8.0% African American, 1.3% Native American, 15.3% Asian, 1.0% Pacific Islander, 6.7% from other races, and 15.4% from two or more races. Hispanic or Latino of any race were 19.9% of the population.

The whole population lived in households. There were 1,528 households, out of which 43.5% included children under the age of 18, 59.2% were married-couple households, 8.0% were cohabiting couple households, 20.2% had a female householder with no partner present, and 12.6% had a male householder with no partner present. 15.7% of households were one person, and 4.6% were one person aged 65 or older. The average household size was 3.07. There were 1,175 families (76.9% of all households).

The age distribution was 26.7% under the age of 18, 8.9% aged 18 to 24, 28.5% aged 25 to 44, 26.2% aged 45 to 64, and 9.8% who were 65 years of age or older. The median age was 36.0 years. For every 100 females, there were 96.8 males.

There were 1,558 housing units at an average density of 155.4 units per square mile (60.0 units/km^{2}), of which 1,528 (98.1%) were occupied. Of these, 74.0% were owner-occupied, and 26.0% were occupied by renters.

In 2023, the US Census Bureau estimated that the median household income was $140,941, and the per capita income was $48,729. About 2.6% of families and 3.6% of the population were below the poverty line.

== Parks and recreation ==
Mather contains three public parks, including Veterans Park, Independence Community Park, and Mather Regional Park. The first two are operated by the Cordova Recreation & Park District while Mather Regional Park is operated by Sacramento County Regional Parks.

The community also is home to Mather Golf Course, a semi-private 18-hole golf course. The course hosts various tournaments and leagues including events sanctioned Northern California Golf Association.

== Education ==
Mather is served by the Folsom Cordova Unified School District. Within the boundary, there are three elementary schools as well as W. E. Mitchell Middle School and Cordova High School (California).
