= Sacramento City Unified School District =

School district in California, USA

Address
- 5735 47th Avenue Sacramento, California; United States

District information
- Type: Public
- Grades: K–12
- Established: 1854
- Superintendent: Cancy McArn
- Schools: 81
- NCES District ID: 0633840

Students and staff
- Students: 40,711 (2020–2021)
- Teachers: 1,765.33 (FTE)
- Staff: 2,021.99 (FTE)
- Student–teacher ratio: 23.06:1

Other information
- Website: www.scusd.edu

Sacramento City Unified School District (SCUSD) is a public school system in Sacramento, California. With 47,900 students in 81 schools, it is the eleventh largest school district in California.

== Boundary ==
The SCUSD includes most of Sacramento south of the American River and some sections north of the river. The district also includes all of Freeport, Fruitridge Pocket, Lemon Hill and Rosemont, as well as most of La Riviera and Parkway, and portions of Elk Grove, Mather, and Rancho Cordova.

== Founding ==
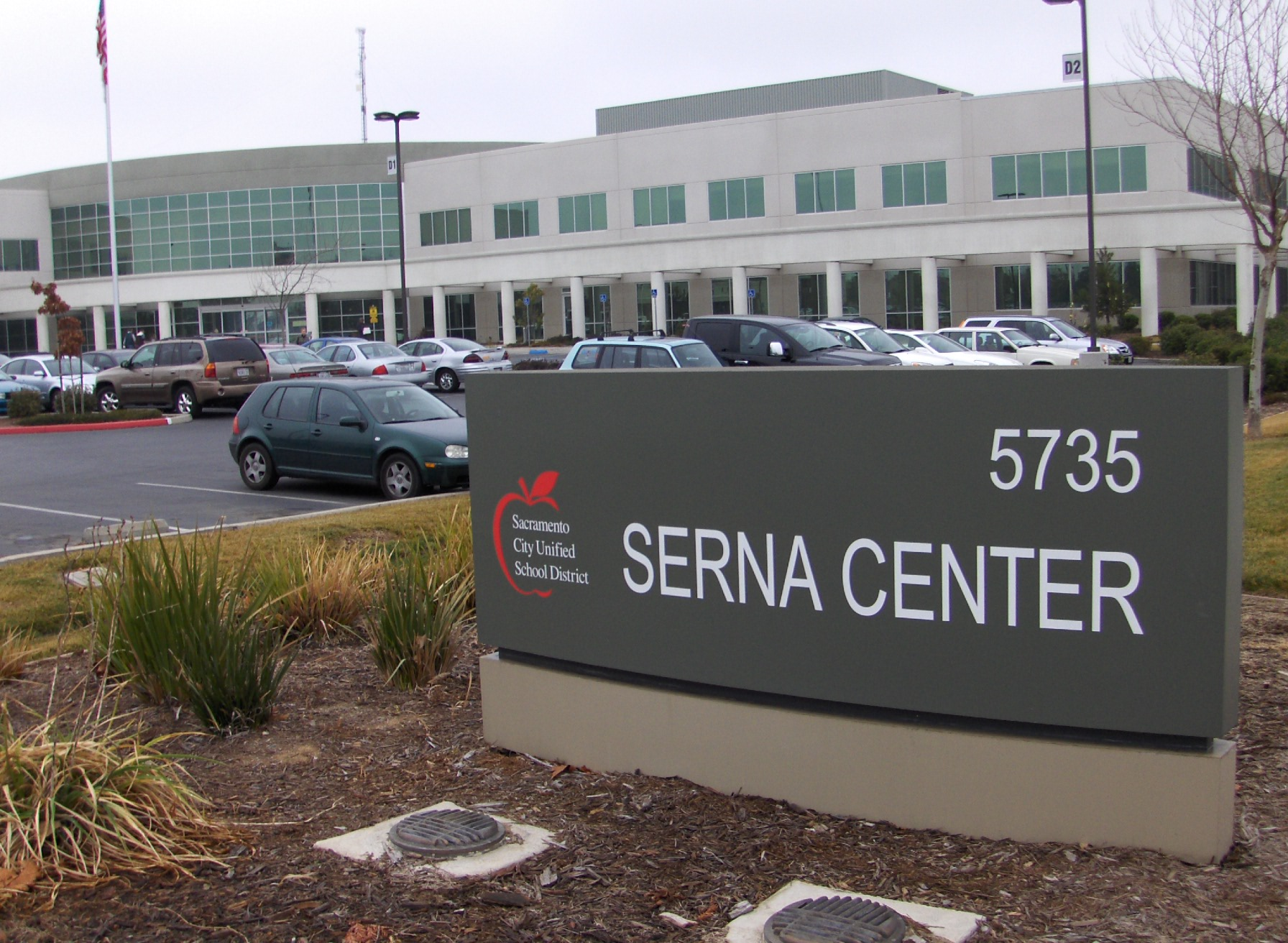
SCUSD main office location, Serna Center at 5735 47th Avenue, Sacramento, CA.

Harvey Willson “H.W.” Harkness was elected as the first president of the Sacramento board of education in 1853. In 1854, city commissioners opened Sacramento's first public school, consisting of two grammar schools and a co-ed primary school. In 1856, Sacramento High School, the city's first high school, opened. It was the second oldest American high school west of the Mississippi River until closing in 2003. In 1894, the board of education abolished segregated education.

== Development ==
In 2012, voters approved two general obligation bonds, Measure Q for $346,000,000 and Measure R for $68,000,000, to improve district facilities.

== Schools ==
=== Demographics ===
The Civil Rights Project at Harvard University conducted for TIME magazine named Sacramento “America’s Most Diverse City.” Accordingly, SCUSD’s student population is reflected as 36% Hispanic or Latino, 18.3% Asian; 16.3% African American; and 19% white. About 7% of students are of two or more races. Residents within SCUSD speak more than 40 languages; 38% of students do not speak English at home.

=== Elementary schools ===
The following is a list of SCUSD elementary schools:

- Ethel I. Baker Elementary School
- Hubert H. Bancroft Elementary School
- John Bidwell Elementary School
- Alice Birney Public Waldorf (K-8)
- Bowling Green Charter Chacon Language & Science Academy
- Bowling Green Charter McCoy Academy
- John Cabrillo Elementary School
- Camellia Basic Elementary School
- Cesar E. Chavez Elementary School (4-6th Grade)
- Isador Cohen Elementary School
- Crocker/Riverside Elementary School
- Genevieve Didion Elementary School (K-8)
- Edward Kemble Elementary School
- Elder Creek Elementary School
- O.W. Erlewine Elementary School
- Caleb Greenwood Elementary School
- Golden Empire Elementary School
- H.W. Harkness Elementary School
- Bret Harte Elementary School
- Phoebe A. Hearst Elementary School
- Hollywood Park Elementary School
- Theodore Judah Elementary School
- Father Keith B. Kenney Elementary School
- Abraham Lincoln Elementary School
- James W. Marshall Elementary School
- John D. Sloat Basic Elementary School
- Leataata Floyd Elementary School
- Leonardo da Vinci eK-8 School
- Martin Luther King Jr. Elementary School
- William Land Elementary School
- David Lubin Elementary School
- Matsuyama Elementary School
- New Joseph Bonnheim Community Charter Elementary School
- Nicholas Elementary School
- Oak Ridge Elementary School
- Pacific Elementary School
- Parkway Elementary School
- Rosa Parks K-8 School
- Ethel Phillips Elementary School
- Pony Express Elementary School
- Sequoia Elementary School
- Susan B. Anthony Elementary School
- Sutterville Elementary School
- Suy:u Elementary School
- Tahoe Elementary School
- Mark Twain Elementary School
- Earl Warren Elementary School
- Washington Elementary School
- A.M. Winn Public Waldorf (K-8)
- Caroline Wenzel Elementary School
- Woodbine Elementary School

=== Middle schools ===
The following is a list of SCUSD middle schools:

- Albert Einstein Middle School
- California Middle School
- Fern Bacon Middle School
- Genevieve Didion(K-8)
- Miwok Middle School
- Sam Brannan Middle School
- School of Engineering and Sciences Middle & High School
- Will C. Wood Middle School
- Umoja International Academy Middle School

=== High schools ===
The following is a list of SCUSD high schools:

- American Legion High School
- Arthur A. Benjamin Health Professions High School
- C. K. McClatchy High School
- George Washington Carver School of Arts and Sciences
- Hiram Johnson High School
- John F. Kennedy High School
- Luther Burbank High School
- The Met Sacramento High School
- Rosemont High School
- Sacramento Accelerated Academy High School
- Sacramento New Technology High School
- School of Engineering and Sciences Middle & High School
- West Campus High School

=== Charter schools ===
The following is a list of SCUSD charter schools:

- Aspire Capitol Heights Academy (K-5)
- Bowling Green Charter Chacon Language & Science Academy (elementary)
- Bowling Green Charter McCoy Academy (elementary)
- California Montessori Project - Capitol Campus (K-8)
- Capitol Collegiate Academy (K-8)
- George Washington Carver School of Arts and Science High School
- Language Academy of Sacramento (K-8)
- Oak Park PrepMiddle School (7-8)
- Sacramento Charter High School
- Sacramento New Technology High School
- Sol Aureus College Preparatory (K-8)
- St. HOPE Public School 7 (PS7) Middle School (6-8)
- St. HOPE Public School 7 (PS7) Elementary School (K-5)
- The Met Sacramento High School
- Yav Pem Suab Academy (elementary)

=== K-12 Schools ===
- Capital City School

=== Notable alumni ===
- Anthony Kennedy – U.S. Supreme Court Justice
- Dr. Cornel West – renowned political scholar

== Sacramento Coalition to Save Public Education ==
The Sacramento Coalition to Save Public Education was formed by disgruntled parents, educators, and community members to counteract what was perceived as an attack on unionized public schools and the abrogation of the responsibility of the district to fund education for every child.

=== Background ===
The Sacramento City Unified School District (SCUSD) Board of Education, led by Superintendent Jim Sweeney, created several charter schools in the district, the most controversial of which is located on the campus of Sacramento High School.

To create a charter school at Sacramento High School, the SCUSD Board made the controversial decision to close Sacramento High School. They then issued a charter to St. Hope, a not-for-profit community development corporation founded by former NBA player Kevin Johnson. St. Hope opened its charter school on September 2, 2003. Some parents, along with the teachers' union, sued the district because it felt the creation of the charter school was not in compliance with California state law. The court found that SCUSD indeed violated the charter school law. A consent decree was entered into by the plaintiffs, St. Hope, and SCUSD. and the settlement required that SCUSD create a public high school for the attendance area served by Sacramento High School. To date several unsuccessful attempts have been made to establish a replacement program for Sacramento High school.
