= Cosumnes River College =

Community college in Sacramento, California

Coordinates: 38°27′14″N 121°25′23″W

- Type: Public community college
- Established: September 14, 1970
- Parent institution: Los Rios Community College District
- Students: 17,534 (Fall 2025)
- Location: Sacramento, California, United States
- Campus: Suburban
- Colors
- Mascot: Hawks
- Website: crc.losrios.edu

Cosumnes River College is a public community college in Sacramento, California. It opened in 1970, taking its name from the Cosumnes River, which flows a few miles to the south. As of Fall 2025, enrollment was at 17,534 students at its main and satellite campus in Elk Grove, California. The college is part of the Los Rios Community College District and part of 4 colleges under the district after Folsom Lake College, a former satellite campus, attained independence in 2004.

== History ==
The concept for Cosumnes River College was included in a Master Facility Need Study that was approved by the Board of Trustees of the Los Rios Community College District in February 1967. A campus site of 180 acres (73 ha) was obtained and construction proceeded on a library building, a science building, an automotive and technology complex, a women's physical education building, and a swimming pool. In Fall 1970, the college opened with an initial enrollment of about 2,150.

Nacht & Lewis Architects of Sacramento designed all of the original buildings before opening, as well as the Learning Resource Center in 2005.

In September 1975, the Business/Social Science building was dedicated, which included computer laboratories. In the spring of 1989, the California state finals for the National Geography Bee were first held within the recital hall. They have been held there in April ever since. In fall of 1990, the cafeteria building was opened, with facilities for both staff and student dining, and also for the instructional food service program. The next phase of construction was in the summer of 1991, which added the College Center building with space for the Admissions/Records, Financial Aid, Business Services, Administration and the book store. In fall of 1995 a visual and performing arts complex was opened, completing the roster of facilities in the college's original plan.

A permanent Child Development Center was completed in March 2002, and in December 2003, staff moved into a new Southeast Office Complex.

In 2004, the Folsom Lake Center was accredited and renamed as Folsom Lake College, becoming the fourth community college under Los Rios Community College District.

In 2004, construction on the Operations and Public Safety (OPS) building was completed. The building houses a variety of support services and departments. This includes a Health Services office staffed by college nurses, the Operations Department offices (housing the offices for Custodial/Maintenance Services and for Facility Use Processing), a Mail and Printing Center, and a substation of the Los Rios Community College Police Department.

The two-story Learning Resource Center was dedicated in 2005 with classroom space, and special computer labs for English as a Second Language, Digital Media, Journalism, and a Math Center. These buildings were funded in part from a voter-approved community college district bond, Measure A.

The college's plans also include construction of an Elk Grove Center in the southern part of Elk Grove. The center site was dedicated with a ground breaking in 2011. Construction also began in 2011 on the $18-million Winn Center for Construction and Architecture, which provides instructional space for Construction, Construction Management Technology, Pharmacy Technology, and Photography among other programs. The building was supported by a $1-million gift from Mike Winn and his family.

In partnership with the Sacramento Regional Transit (SACRT), construction the CRC/Regional Transit Parking Structure began in 2011. In 2015, the college received light rail service when the Blue Line was extended to terminate at a new station on Bruceville Road on the east side of the campus.

== Student life ==
Student demographics as of Fall 2023
Race and ethnicity	Total
Hispanic	29%
White	22%
Asian	19%
African American	9%
Unknown	8%
Multiracial	6%
Filipino	5%
Pacific Islander	1%

Cosumnes River College is home to The Connection, a biweekly newspaper. An opinion zine, The Voice, is also published on campus.

Cosumnes River College is home to 27 active clubs, of which 10 are racial unions or empowerment clubs, 8 are academic clubs, and 9 are recreational clubs.

== Athletics ==
The college was a factor in area college sports from the beginning. It opened up the 1971 football season against reigning state champion College of the Redwoods and nearly pulled off an upset. The team was coached by Coit Conant. During the short period of time that the school fielded a football team, from 1971 to 1978, it was a strong area power in football. The school has provided teams in all other major sports since the inception of the school winning several conference titles.

In 2006, the college became home to the now-defunct Sacramento Heatwave of the American Basketball Association (ABA). In 2012, The Cosumnes River Hawks Baseball team took home the school's first ever state championship. In 2012 and 2013, the college's Community Athletic Center hosted the California Community College Athletic Association state basketball Final Four and Championship tournament.

Major construction of new athletic fields on the north side of campus was completed in 2012–13, including two soccer fields, softball complex, baseball complex (renamed Conway Field), and complete remodeling of the shared-use football stadium with the addition of artificial turf.

== Notable alumni ==
- Mike Diva - VFX artist and director
- Jermaine Dye - Major League outfielder for the Chicago White Sox and 2005 World Series MVP
- David Hernandez - Major League relief pitcher for the Arizona Diamondbacks and Baltimore Orioles
- Matthew Griffin - game designer and marketer
