= Upper Land Park, Sacramento, California =

Coordinates: 38.5571°N 121.5089°W

Upper Land Park is a neighborhood in the more general Land Park area of Sacramento, California which is referred to by the city as Area 2. It is located near the junction of U.S. Route 50 and Interstate 5. Its boundaries are officially Broadway to the north, Swanston Drive to the south, Riverside Boulevard to the east, and I-5 to the west.
