= Rancho Cordova, California =

City in California, United States

- City
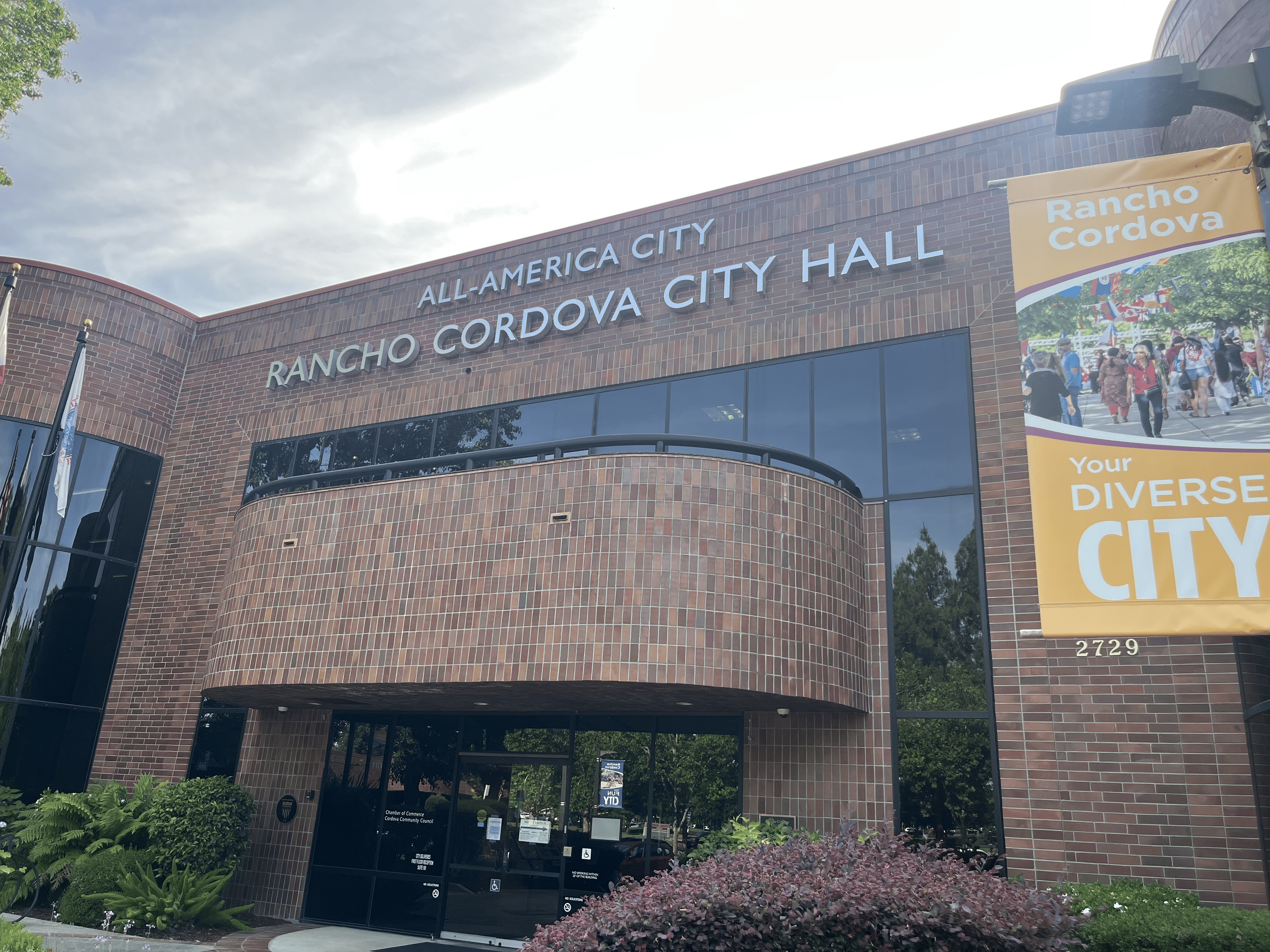
- Rancho Cordova City Hall

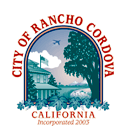
- Seal
- Motto: "City Life Reinvented"
- Interactive map of Rancho Cordova, California
- Location within California Location within the United States
- Coordinates: 38°35′21″N 121°18′10″W
- Country: United States
- State: California
- County: Sacramento
- Incorporated: July 1, 2003

Government
  - Type: Council–manager
  - Mayor: Garett Gatewood
  - Vice mayor: Linda Budge
  - City manager: Micah Runner

Area
  - Total: 34.88 sq mi (90.33 km^{2})
  - Land: 34.57 sq mi (89.53 km^{2})
  - Water: 0.31 sq mi (0.80 km^{2}) 0.88%
- Elevation: 89 ft (27 m)

Population (2020)
  - Total: 79,332
  - Density: 2,295/sq mi (886.1/km^{2})
- Time zone: UTC-8 (PST)
  - Summer (DST): UTC-7 (PDT)
- ZIP codes: 95827, 95670, 95741, 95742
- Area codes: 916, 279
- FIPS code: 06-59444
- GNIS feature ID: 1659466
- Website: www.cityofranchocordova.org

Rancho Cordova is a city in Sacramento County, California, United States. Incorporated in 2003, it is part of the Sacramento Metropolitan Area. The population was 79,332 at the 2020 census. In 2010 and 2019, Rancho Cordova received the All-America City Award.

== Etymology ==
While originally associated with hut where herdsmen or farm laborers lived, the word rancho, became tied closer to landed estates as private land grants became differentiated from the public domain. The city itself was named for the Cordova Vineyard, which was located in the center of the Rancho Rio de los Americanos land grant. Other names of the town included Cordova Vineyards and Cordova Village, before it was officially named Rancho Cordova when a post office was established in the community on May 16, 1955.

== History ==
=== Spanish and Mexican land grants ===
In 1844, the Mexican governor of California, Manuel Micheltorena, granted 35,000 acres on the south bank of the American River to the American entrepreneur William Leidesdorff. He died in 1848 and the property, which he called Rancho Río de los Americanos, passed to his mother, Anne Marie Spark, who later sold it to Captain Joseph Folsom. A portion of the land would become Folsom, California while the Cordova Vineyard, which gave Rancho Cordova its name, was also located within the land grant.

=== Gold Rush era ===
In the Gold Rush era of mid-19th-century California, placer mining took place around Rancho Cordova, and some traces of it can still be found. The elevation of the generally level terrain is approximately 118 feet (36 m) above mean sea level. Lone Star Gravel Company and other companies have historically extracted younger gravels at depths of 30 to 40 feet (12 m) without encountering groundwater, which is characteristically found at about 100 feet (30 m). Partially confined groundwater generally flows to the southwest.

As the miners left Sacramento traveling to the foothills in search of gold, way stations grew up along the first dirt trails, and later more formal roads, that took travelers east. Commercial establishments, hotels, or ‘stations’ were developed at one-mile intervals along the route. Many of the stations ultimately also became the US Post Office for their area.

Travelers and miners apparently headed out L Street from Sacramento (the approximate alignment of present-day Folsom Blvd) along a plank, or macadam, road that ended at present day Bradshaw Road. Brighton, also called Five Mile Station, was the site of three inns. One inn, the Magnolia House, established in 1849, was the first stop on the Pony Express Route. The location is today marked by the old Brighton Station building, visible on the south side of Folsom Boulevard where the overpasses for Highway 50 and the light rail are located. One closer stop, at four miles, was known as Hoboken or Norristown, in the vicinity of California State University, Sacramento. The old Perkins building, where the Jackson Highway leaves Folsom Boulevard, and Manlove were both locations for way stations.

The vicinity of Bradshaw was Ten Mile Station, the Patterson's "American Fork House", established in 1852, and the beginning of large farms, vineyards, and orchards. Up the road was Routier Station, established in 1871. Mrs. Mayhew left Mayhew Station to take over as Post Mistress at Routier Station when the post office opened in 1887. Mr. Patterson was Postmaster there for a while also. Joseph Routier was widely renowned for many years for the quality of his produce. In 1866 the railroad built the train station between Folsom Boulevard and the tracks due to the size and dependability of the crop, and the need for a formal packing shed to house the produce waiting for the train.

At eleven miles, the road forked. The Coloma Road went north along the river to Coloma and the northern mines, very close to its present location; the southerly fork headed for White Rock and the Southern Mines. The southerly fork was the White Rock Road, known at that time as the White Rock – Clarksville Immigrant Road. The outcropping of white rock marked the entry into El Dorado County, and Clarksville was the first sizable settlement over the hill. 15 Mile House was built in 1850, and is commemorated with a brick cairn on White Rock Road in front of the CalTrans Emergency Ops building. It was managed by A.M. Plummer until purchased in 1857 by its most famous innkeeper, H.F.W. Deterding. His son Charles ran the hotel until at least 1890, and their hospitality was known far and wide. 15 Mile House was the second official Pony Express remount station. Eleven miles east of that, the third remount station was located at Sportsman Hall at Mormon Island, before the express riders went over the mountains headed for St. Joseph, Missouri. The Mormon Island ruins surface from under Folsom Lake at Dike 8 during low water years.

There were also way stations along the Coloma Road, such as the 14 Mile House, built on the Coloma Road in 1850 by Mr. Rush, the original builder of Deterding's 15 Mile House. In 1852 early settlement of the Mills area included a two-story inn owned by Louis Lepetit. Four stage lines came through there, and split, with two going southeast to Placerville, and two following the river to Coloma. In the 1880s a fire destroyed the inn, and Mr. Lepetit may have rebuilt across the road on the north side.

A community of vineyards and orchards had grown up between the 1850s and the 1880s. Maps of the area show the familiar names of Studarus, Williamson, Mendon ca, Kelley, Carroll, Shields, Dauenhauer, Lauridson, Kilgore, and Deterding.The list goes on with names that to a small extent, have been preserved as place names. John Studarus was one of the early settlers. In 1911, he built the present day Mills Station which served as a general commercial building, housing a tavern, grocery store, and ballroom. The building also housed the Post Office, where two of his children both ran the Post Office at various times.

The agricultural heritage of Rancho Cordova declined in the 1930s and 1940s. Along with facing droughts in the broader northern California region, state legislature raised property tax rates, setting values at "the highest and best use" as opposed to the actual use of land.

=== Post World War II ===
Many young men returning from World War II were looking for places to settle down, find a job, buy a home, and raise their families. Roland Federspiel formed a partnership with Glenn Ahlstrom and a contractor named Jacobsen to build homes on land that had previously been vineyards.

Construction began at the intersection of Folsom Boulevard and Zinfandel Drive. The first three homes on the west side of the street were the model homes. Duplexes on the opposite corners originally housed the sales office and post office, then the first office of Rancho Cordova Grapevine-Independent.

Federspiel had chosen the name Cordova Vineyards with a nod to the Córdoba region of Spain, and wanted to preserve the Cordova name. Glenn Ahlstrom drove down to San Francisco in his old woodie station wagon and physically brought back the first ‘post box’. The US Postal Service agreed to let them use the name Rancho Cordova as it was just the right size to fit around the circle of the old postal franking stamp. They named the streets for wine grapes. In recognition of that heritage, Elliott Homes named all of the streets in the Villages of Zinfandel at Stonecreek for wineries around the world when they began to build at the south end of Zinfandel in 2000.

The community grew, and Folsom Boulevard began to fill in with commercial enterprise. Early structures included the Cordova Village Shopping Center and George E. Johnson's Cordova Inn.

On February 16, 2000, Emery Worldwide Flight 17 crashed onto an automobile salvage yard near Sacramento Mather Airport. All three crew members were killed.

There were attempts to incorporate Rancho Cordova in 1961 and in 1978. The 1978 effort was kept alive over the next 20 years, finally getting on the ballot in November 2002. It passed 77% of voters in support. Rancho Cordova officially became a city on July 1, 2003.

== Geography ==
According to the United States Census Bureau, the CDP has a total area of 34.9 square miles (90 km^{2}), of which 34.6 square miles (90 km^{2}) is land and 0.3 square miles (0.78 km^{2}) (0.88%) is water. Rancho Cordova lies within the Sacramento Valley.

=== Climate ===
As part of the greater Sacramento area, Rancho Cordova experiences a hot-summer Mediterranean climate (Köppen: Csa). Summers are hot and dry, while winters are cool and rainy. Monthly mean high temperatures range from 56.0 °F (13.3 °C) in January to 92.6 °F (33.7 °C) in July, while lows range from 39.2 °F (4.0 °C) in January to 59.2 °F (15.1 °C) in July. Yearly precipitation totals around 18.14 in (46.1 cm), with the majority of precipitation falling between December and March.

== Transportation ==
Regional highway access is provided by U.S. Route 50 and State Route 16.

Rancho Cordova is served by Sacramento Regional Transit's various bus lines and the Gold Line light rail line. According to the US Census Bureau's American Community Survey for 2021, fewer than 0.5 percent of Rancho Cordova commuters employ public transportation. Students enrolled in a FCUSD school can get a free bus pass.

The city also manages local transportation operations by addressing traffic concerns through its Neighborhood Traffic Management Program (NTMP), traffic volume monitoring, and designated truck routes. The city is also developing an Active Transportation Plan to improve infrastructure for walking and bicycling. This includes expanded networks of sidewalks and shared-use paths.

== Demographics ==
Historical population
Census	Pop.	Note	%±
1960	7,429		—
1970	30,451		309.9%
1980	42,881		40.8%
1990	48,731		13.6%
2000	55,060		13.0%
2010	64,776		17.6%
2020	79,332		22.5%
U.S. Decennial Census; 1850–1870 1880-1890; 1900 1910 1920; 1930 1940 1950; 1960 1970 1980; 1990 2000 2010

Ranch Cordova first appeared as an unincorporated community in the 1960 U.S. census; and as a census designated place in the 1980 U.S. census. It was deleted prior to the 2010 U.S. census after being incorporated as a city. The Mather CDP was created at the same time as it was not part of the incorporation..

=== Racial and ethnic composition ===
Rancho Cordova city, California – Racial and ethnic composition Note: the US Census treats Hispanic/Latino as an ethnic category. This table excludes Latinos from the racial categories and assigns them to a separate category. Hispanics/Latinos may be of any race.
Race / Ethnicity (NH = Non-Hispanic)	Pop 2000	Pop 2010	Pop 2020	% 2000	% 2010	% 2020
White alone (NH)	33,790	33,863	35,472	61.37%	52.28%	44.71%
Black or African American alone (NH)	6,075	6,286	7,072	11.03%	9.70%	8.91%
Native American or Alaska Native alone (NH)	408	398	382	0.74%	0.61%	0.48%
Asian alone (NH)	4,449	7,645	12,171	8.08%	11.80%	15.34%
Native Hawaiian or Pacific Islander alone (NH)	272	506	871	0.49%	0.78%	1.10%
Other race alone (NH)	147	158	588	0.27%	0.24%	0.74%
Mixed race or Multiracial (NH)	2,819	3,180	5,657	5.12%	4.91%	7.13%
Hispanic or Latino (any race)	7,100	12,740	17,119	12.90%	19.67%	21.58%
Total	55,060	64,776	79,332	100.00%	100.00%	100.00%

=== 2020 census ===
As of the 2020 census, Rancho Cordova had a population of 79,332 and a population density of 2,294.9 inhabitants per square mile (886.1/km^{2}). The median age was 35.5 years. The age distribution was 24.9% under the age of 18, 8.3% aged 18 to 24, 30.5% aged 25 to 44, 23.4% aged 45 to 64, and 12.9% aged 65 or older. For every 100 females, there were 95.9 males, and for every 100 females age 18 and over, there were 93.3 males.

The census reported that 99.1% of the population lived in households, 0.8% lived in non-institutionalized group quarters, and 0.1% were institutionalized. Of residents, 99.7% lived in urban areas and 0.3% lived in rural areas.

There were 27,737 households, of which 36.8% had children under the age of 18 living in them. Of all households, 46.0% were married-couple households, 8.0% were cohabiting-couple households, 18.4% were households with a male householder and no spouse or partner present, and 27.5% were households with a female householder and no spouse or partner present. About 22.7% of households were one person, and 8.2% had someone living alone who was 65 years of age or older. The average household size was 2.83, and there were 19,178 families (69.1% of all households).

There were 28,614 housing units at an average density of 827.7 units per square mile (319.6 units/km^{2}). Of all housing units, 96.9% were occupied and 3.1% were vacant. Of occupied units, 56.4% were owner-occupied and 43.6% were occupied by renters. The homeowner vacancy rate was 1.3%, and the rental vacancy rate was 2.6%.

Racial composition as of the 2020 census
Race	Number	Percent
White	38,685	48.8%
Black or African American	7,388	9.3%
American Indian and Alaska Native	920	1.2%
Asian	12,403	15.6%
Native Hawaiian and Other Pacific Islander	900	1.1%
Some other race	8,365	10.5%
Two or more races	10,671	13.5%

=== 2023 ACS estimates ===
In 2023, the US Census Bureau estimated that the median household income was $89,120, and the per capita income was $37,822. About 7.9% of families and 11.2% of the population were below the poverty line.

=== 2010 census ===
The 2010 United States census reported that Rancho Cordova had a population of 64,776. The population density was 1,912.3 inhabitants per square mile (738.3/km^{2}). The racial makeup of Rancho Cordova was 39,123 (60.4%) White, 8,561 (13.1%) African American, 668 (1.0%) Native American, 7,831 (12.1%) Asian (3.6% Filipino, 2.0% Indian, 1.6% Vietnamese, 1.4% Chinese, 1.0% Korean, 0.4% Japanese, 2.0% Other), 556 (0.9%) Pacific Islander, 5,517 (8.5%) from other races, and 4,520 (7.0%) from two or more races. Hispanic or Latino of any race were 12,740 persons (19.7%).

The Census reported that 64,451 people (99.5% of the population) lived in households, 170 (0.3%) lived in non-institutionalized group quarters, and 155 (0.2%) were institutionalized.

There were 23,448 households, out of which 8,722 (37.2%) had children under the age of 18 living in them, 10,521 (44.9%) were opposite-sex married couples living together, 3,815 (16.3%) had a female householder with no husband present, 1,431 (6.1%) had a male householder with no wife present. There were 1,751 (7.5%) unmarried opposite-sex partnerships, and 198 (0.8%) same-sex married couples or partnerships. 5,815 households (24.8%) were made up of individuals, and 1,604 (6.8%) had someone living alone who was 65 years of age or older. The average household size was 2.75. There were 15,767 families (67.2% of all households); the average family size was 3.30.

The population was spread out, with 17,011 people (26.3%) under the age of 18, 6,441 people (9.9%) aged 18 to 24, 19,508 people (30.1%) aged 25 to 44, 15,182 people (23.4%) aged 45 to 64, and 6,634 people (10.2%) who were 65 years of age or older. The median age was 33.1 years. For every 100 females, there were 95.8 males. For every 100 females age 18 and over, there were 92.3 males.

There were 25,479 housing units at an average density of 752.2 units per square mile (290.4 units/km^{2}), of which 12,948 (55.2%) were owner-occupied, and 10,500 (44.8%) were occupied by renters. The homeowner vacancy rate was 3.3%; the rental vacancy rate was 8.9%. 34,907 people (53.9% of the population) lived in owner-occupied housing units and 29,544 people (45.6%) lived in rental housing units.

=== Pre-incorporation ===
Rancho Cordova sphere of influence

Following the adoption of the 1978 Cordova Community Plan, the Sacramento County Local Agency Formation Commission adopted a sphere of influence for Rancho Cordova. This is one of the defining documents of the actual community boundary for the community.

== Economy ==
According to Rancho Cordova's 2025 Annual Comprehensive Financial Report, the top employers in the city are:

#	Employer	# of Employees
1	Folsom Cordova Unified School District	2,050
2	Vision Service Plan	1,600
3	Franklin Templeton	1,593
4	The Permanente Medical Group	822
5	Health Net Federal Services	700
6	Nidec Motor Corporation	400
7	Kaiser Foundation	338
8	Phillips Image Guided Therapy Corp	310
9	Educational Credit Management Corp	293
10	Teledyne Defense Electronics	200

== Arts and culture ==
=== Points of interest ===
The City of Rancho Cordova has an arts scene, a Barrel District, 26 miles of bike and pedestrian trails, 70 acres of creek channels and tributaries, and many free events. Rancho Cordova has six miles of the American River, as well as Soil Born Farms and Rancho Roots, the only working urban farms in the region.

- American River Parkway
- Sacramento Children's Museum
- Aerojet/Rocketdyne
- Edward Kelley School

== Government ==
=== City government ===
The City of Rancho Cordova has a council-manager form of government with five members elected to the council. Each year, the position of mayor is appointed to a council member, chosen by their peers in the city council. The mayor's post is thus simply that of "chief among equals for a time". Rancho Cordova's mayor is Garett Gatewood, and Linda Budge is vice mayor. The other council members are David Sander, Joe Little, and Siri Pulipati. Each Council Member represents of the five districts.

Its sound financial status has been recognized by the rating agency Standard and Poor (S&P). On November 1st, 2016, S&P's Rating Services updated the City of Rancho Cordova's Credit Rating to AA−, noting the city's outlook is positive and strong manegment policy as well as sound budgeting practices. The city has also been the recipient of GFOA Certificate of Achievement Award for Excellence in Financial Reporting for 14 straight years.

=== County government ===
Rancho Cordova is represented by Pat Hume and Rich Desmond on the Sacramento County Board of Supervisors.

=== State representation ===
In the California State Senate, Rancho Cordova is in the 6th senatorial district, represented by Republican Roger Niello. In the California State Assembly, it is in the 7th Assembly district, represented by Republican Josh Hoover.

=== Federal representation ===
As of 2023, in the United States House of Representatives, Rancho Cordova is in California's 6th congressional district, represented by Democrat Ami Bera.

== Education ==
Rancho Cordova students are served by four different school districts, including Folsom Cordova Unified School District, Sacramento City Unified School District, Elk Grove Unified School District, and San Juan Unified School District, and 21 post-secondary schools that provide a broad spectrum of learning opportunities.

The majority of the city lies within the Folsom-Cordova Unified School District, which operates Cordova High School, Walnutwood High School, and Kinney High School.

Portions of Rancho Cordova are served by the Sacramento City Unified School District and the Elk Grove Unified School District. Schools in SCUSD include Abraham Lincoln Elementary School, George Washington Carver School of Arts and Science, and A. M. Winn Public Waldorf School. Within EGUSD, elementary schools include Sunrise Elementary School and Elizabeth Pinkerton McGarvey Elementary School, with the third, Grantline 208 Elementary School, under construction.

A small number of students attend schools in the San Juan Unified School District, which does not cover any territory of Rancho Cordova.

Postsecondary education in the city include the Folsom Lake College - Rancho Cordova Center, a CALRegional branch specializing in healthcare, a San Joaquin Valley College branch, and Folsom Cordova Adult School. Propriety colleges include California Northstate University College of Health Sciences and a Carrington College (US). Additionally, an InterCoast College serves as a trade school in the local area.

Data on the educational status of Rancho Cordovans shows that approximately 85% of residents 25 years or older have a high school education and 22% of residents hold some type of college or post-secondary school degree. In Sacramento County, 85% of residents 25 years or older have a high school education and 28% of residents hold some type of college or post-secondary school degree. In California, 80% of residents 25 years or older have a high school education and 30% of residents hold some type of college or post-secondary school degree.

== Infrastructure ==
=== Utilities ===
Water service in Rancho Cordova is provided by a combination of private companies and public agencies, including, Golden State Water Company and California American Water, the Sacramento Counter Agency, and City of Folsom Water District. The Sacramento Area Sewer District (SacSewer) serves as the region's sewage treatment agency.

Electricity is provided by Sacramento Municipal Utility District and natural gas is provided by Pacific Gas and Electric Company.

The city operates a stormwater management system using pump stations, drainage infrastructure, regional detention basins, and natural waterways. The Stormwater Division operates alongside other agencies including the California Department of Fish and Wildlife.

Waste management is operated and handled by Atlas Disposal Industries.

=== Public safety ===
Since incorporating in 2003, Rancho Cordova has maintained a law enforcement services contract with the Sacramento County Sheriff's Department and formed the Rancho Cordova Police Department. While deputies assigned to the Rancho Cordova Police Department wear unique "Rancho Cordova" uniform patches and drive police vehicles with "Rancho Cordova" markings, they are, in fact, sheriff's deputies. The structure of the contracted Rancho Cordova Police Department closely mirrors that of an independent police department and includes detectives, traffic enforcement, community service officers, patrol, and administration functions. The City of Rancho Cordova pays the salaries for approximately 70 sworn and 14 non-sworn professional staff. The Police Department includes approximately 70 sworn deputies, 17 sergeants, 5 lieutenants, and 1 captain. The East Division of the Sheriff's Department also operates in conjunction with the Rancho Cordova Police Department and function as a joint command. The East Division handles unincorporated eastern Sacramento County (Rosemont, Gold River, Mather, Rancho Murieta, Sloughhouse, etc.), while the Rancho Cordova Police Department handles calls within city limits. Deputies in this case frequently cross over between the two areas. This arrangement for contracted law enforcement services is fairly common among California cities because it requires fewer overhead costs than running an independent police department and allows the city to avoid long-term pension obligations for police employees.

Sacramento Metropolitan Fire District provides fire/EMS services.

== Notable people ==
- Chris Bosio, MLB pitcher with the Milwaukee Brewers and Seattle Mariners.
- Maelyn Dean, author of "Real Life" comics
- Lester Holt, NBC television journalist
- Geoff Jenkins, former MLB outfielder
- Neal Jimenez, screenwriter and director
- Robbie Jones, actor, One Tree Hill and Hellcats
- Jerry Manuel, former MLB player and manager
- Billy Marshall Stoneking, Australian-American poet and filmmaker
- Max Venable, 10-year MLB outfielder
- Seneca Wallace, NFL quarterback
- Gerald Willhite, former running back for the Denver Broncos
- Ken Cooley, politician

== Sister cities ==
- Turrialba, Costa Rica
