= Folsom, California =

City in California, United States

- City
- Aerial view of Folsom Historic District

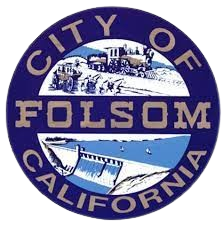
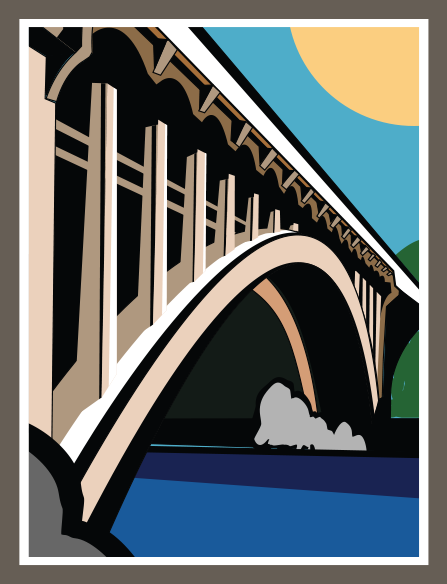
- Flag Seal Logo
- Motto: "Distinctive by Nature"
- Interactive map of Folsom, California
- Location in the contiguous United States
- Coordinates: 38°40′20″N 121°9′28″W
- Country: United States
- State: California
- County: Sacramento
- Incorporated: April 20, 1946

Government
  - Mayor: Justin Raithel

Area
  - Total: 30.15 sq mi (78.09 km^{2})
  - Land: 27.88 sq mi (72.21 km^{2})
  - Water: 2.27 sq mi (5.88 km^{2}) 7.53%
- Elevation: 220 ft (67 m)

Population (2026)
  - Total: 95,680
  - Rank: 82nd in California
  - Density: 3,432/sq mi (1,325/km^{2})
- Time zone: UTC−8 (PST)
  - Summer (DST): UTC−7 (PDT)
- ZIP Codes: 95630, 95671, 95763
- Area codes: 916/279
- FIPS code: 06-24638
- GNIS feature IDs: 277516, 2410516
- Website: www.folsom.ca.us

Folsom is a city in northeastern Sacramento County, California, United States. A population estimate on January 1, 2026, puts the city's population at 95,680 residents.

Folsom is well known for its Gold Rush history, dating back to the mid-19th century. It is also associated with musician Johnny Cash and the Folsom State Prison, located in the northwest area of the city, and as a major hub for outdoor recreation centered around Folsom Lake and Lake Natoma.

== History ==
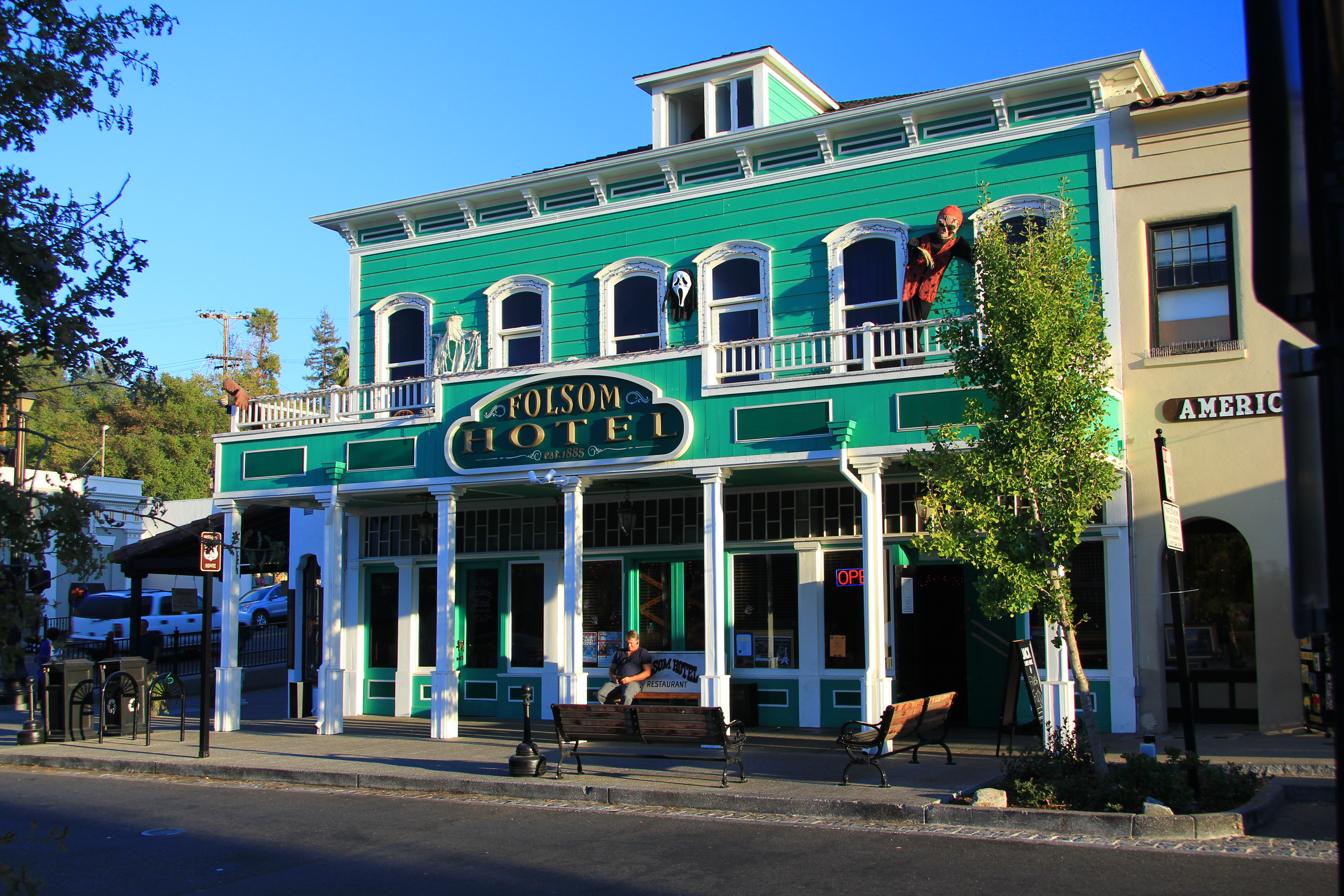
Folsom Hotel, built in 1885

Prior to European settlement, the area in what is now Folsom was inhabited by the Nisenan tribe of Native Americans. The Gold Rush of 1849 brought violence, disease and displacement for the tribes of California.

Joseph Libbey Folsom purchased Rancho Rio de los Americanos from the heirs of San Francisco merchant William Alexander Leidesdorff, and laid out the town called Granite City, mostly occupied by gold miners seeking their fortune in the Sierra Nevada foothills. Though few amassed a great deal of wealth, the city prospered due to Joseph Folsom's lobbying to get a railway to connect the town with Sacramento. Joseph died in 1855, and Granite City was later renamed Folsom in his honor. The railway was abandoned in the 1980s but opened up as the terminus of the Gold Line of Sacramento Regional Transit District's light rail service in 2005. A few former gold-rush era towns are located in and around Folsom, including Prairie City, Salmon Falls, and Mormon Island.

During the American Civil War, the residents of Folsom remained fiercely loyal to the Union. The Granite Guard was organized at Folsom on May 27, 1861, and the majority of the recruits of Shirland's Cavalry Company of the 1st California Cavalry Regiment were also from Folsom. In 1866, 1871, and 1872, Folsom experienced major fires. In 1886, another major fire destroyed much of the city's business property.

The establishment of Folsom Prison came in 1880, when the Livermore family made an agreement with the state to donate land for the prison in exchange for prison labor. They planned to build a hydro-electric dam from the American River for a sawmill. Though the sawmill did not work out, the Livermores soon realized that the natural force of running water could provide enough power to transmit to Sacramento, and the Folsom Powerhouse, now a National Historic Landmark, was opened. At the time it was opened, it had the longest overhead run of electricity (22 miles) in the country. The powerhouse operated until 1952.

Folsom Dam was built in 1956, providing flood control and water rights for the Sacramento Valley and created Folsom Lake. The dam is located on the southwest corner of the lake. The lake is an estimated 4.8 miles (7.7 km) from Granite Bay to the most southern point of Folsom Lake.

Folsom is home to Folsom Lake College, Folsom High School, Vista del Lago High School and a historic downtown district. Folsom is also home to the largest private employer in the Sacramento area, Intel. A new high school is planned to be built in the Folsom Ranch area.

The Folsom Plan Area allows the construction of 11,000 homes resulting in 25,000 additional residents enlarging the city of Folsom by one-third. The planned community development area of 3,250 acres (1,320 ha) south of Highway 50 includes additional housing, schools and parks along with office and commercial buildings.

== Geography ==
According to the United States Census Bureau, the city has a total area of 30.2 square miles (78 km^{2}), of which 27.9 square miles (72 km^{2}) is land and 2.3 square miles (6.0 km^{2}) (7.53%) is water. Folsom is located in the foothills of the Sierra Nevada.

Carpenter Hill in Folsom has the highest elevation in Sacramento County, at 831 feet (253 meters).

=== Climate ===
Folsom's climate is characterized by long, hot, dry summers and cool, rainy winters.

Climate data for Folsom, California (Folsom Dam), 1981–2010 normals
Month	Jan	Feb	Mar	Apr	May	Jun	Jul	Aug	Sep	Oct	Nov	Dec	Year
Mean daily maximum °F (°C)	54 (12)	61 (16)	65 (18)	72 (22)	81 (27)	89 (32)	94 (34)	94 (34)	88 (31)	79 (26)	62 (17)	54 (12)	74 (23)
Mean daily minimum °F (°C)	38 (3)	43 (6)	46 (8)	48 (9)	52 (11)	58 (14)	61 (16)	60 (16)	58 (14)	54 (12)	44 (7)	39 (4)	50 (10)
Average precipitation inches (mm)	3.70 (94)	4.63 (118)	4.65 (118)	1.74 (44)	.67 (17)	.38 (9.7)	.06 (1.5)	.11 (2.8)	.62 (16)	1.46 (37)	3.96 (101)	3.83 (97)	25.80 (655)

== Demographics ==
Historical population
Census	Pop.	Note	%±
1890	609		—
1950	1,690		—
1960	3,925		132.2%
1970	5,810		48.0%
1980	11,003		89.4%
1990	29,802		170.9%
2000	51,884		74.1%
2010	72,203		39.2%
2020	80,454		11.4%
2025 (est.)	92,577	▲	15.1%
U.S. Decennial Census

Folsom is part of the Sacramento metropolitan area.

=== Racial and ethnic composition ===
Folsom, California – Racial and ethnic composition Note: the US Census treats Hispanic/Latino as an ethnic category. This table excludes Latinos from the racial categories and assigns them to a separate category. Hispanics/Latinos may be of any race.
Race / Ethnicity (NH = Non-Hispanic)	Pop 1980	Pop 1990	Pop 2000	Pop 2010	Pop 2020	% 1980	% 1990	% 2000	% 2010	% 2020
White alone (NH)	9,490	22,387	38,500	48,009	44,972	86.25%	75.12%	74.20%	66.49%	55.90%
Black or African American alone (NH)	547	2,896	3,086	4,080	3,342	4.97%	9.72%	5.95%	5.65%	4.15%
Native American or Alaska Native alone (NH)	N/A	172	237	289	269	N/A	0.58%	0.46%	0.40%	0.33%
Asian alone (NH)	N/A	1,003	3,693	8,917	15,742	N/A	3.37%	7.12%	12.35%	19.57%
Pacific Islander alone (NH)	N/A	N/A	93	156	185	N/A	N/A	0.18%	0.22%	0.23%
Other race alone (NH)	314	99	112	439	494	2.85%	0.33%	0.22%	0.61%	0.61%
Mixed race or Multiracial (NH)	N/A	N/A	1,249	2,249	4,947	N/A	N/A	2.41%	3.11%	6.15%
Hispanic or Latino (any race)	652	3,245	4,914	8,064	10,503	5.93%	10.89%	9.47%	11.17%	13.05%
Total	11,003	29,802	51,884	72,203	80,454	100.00%	100.00%	100.00%	100.00%	100.00%

=== 2020 census ===
As of the 2020 census, Folsom had a population of 80,454 and a population density of 2,885.6 inhabitants per square mile (1,114.1/km^{2}). The median age was 40.5 years. The age distribution was 22.2% under the age of 18, 7.4% aged 18 to 24, 27.2% aged 25 to 44, 28.8% aged 45 to 64, and 14.4% who were 65 years of age or older. For every 100 females, there were 106.7 males, and for every 100 females age 18 and over there were 107.7 males age 18 and over.

The census reported that 92.5% of the population lived in households, 0.3% lived in non-institutionalized group quarters, and 7.2% were institutionalized. 98.6% of residents lived in urban areas, while 1.4% lived in rural areas.

There were 28,336 households, out of which 36.9% included children under the age of 18, 58.0% were married-couple households, 4.7% were cohabiting couple households, 23.3% had a female householder with no partner present, and 13.9% had a male householder with no partner present. 22.8% of households were one person, and 10.2% were one person aged 65 or older. The average household size was 2.63. There were 20,246 families (71.4% of all households).

There were 29,574 housing units at an average density of 1,060.7 units per square mile (409.5 units/km^{2}), of which 95.8% were occupied and 4.2% were vacant. Of occupied housing units, 68.0% were owner-occupied and 32.0% were occupied by renters. The homeowner vacancy rate was 0.9% and the rental vacancy rate was 6.9%.

=== 2023 ACS 5-year estimates ===
In 2023, the US Census Bureau estimated that 19.2% of the population were foreign-born. Of all people aged 5 or older, 75.3% spoke only English at home, 5.8% spoke Spanish, 7.9% spoke other Indo-European languages, 9.4% spoke Asian or Pacific Islander languages, and 1.5% spoke other languages. Of those aged 25 or older, 94.6% were high school graduates and 54.7% had a bachelor's degree.

The median household income was $139,263, and the per capita income was $61,008. About 3.3% of families and 5.3% of the population were below the poverty line.

=== 2010 census ===
At the 2010 census Folsom had a population of 72,203. The population density was 2,971.2 inhabitants per square mile (1,147.2/km^{2}). The racial makeup of Folsom was 53,627 (74.3%) White, 4,140 (5.7%) African American, 427 (0.6%) Native American, 9,000 (12.5%) Asian, 173 (0.2%) Pacific Islander, 1,818 (2.5%) from other races, and 3,018 (4.2%) from two or more races. Hispanic or Latino of any race were 8,064 persons (11.2%).

The census reported that 65,243 people (90.4% of the population) lived in households, 188 (0.3%) lived in non-institutionalized group quarters, and 6,772 (9.4%) were institutionalized.

There were 24,951 households, 9,796 (39.3%) had children under the age of 18 living in them, 14,399 (57.7%) were opposite-sex married couples living together, 2,195 (8.8%) had a female householder with no husband present, 1,006 (4.0%) had a male householder with no wife present. There were 1,150 (4.6%) unmarried opposite-sex partnerships, and 137 (0.5%) same-sex married couples or partnerships. 5,788 households (23.2%) were one person and 1,930 (7.7%) had someone living alone who was 65 or older. The average household size was 2.61. There were 17,600 families (70.5% of households); the average family size was 3.13.

The age distribution was 17,570 people (24.3%) under the age of 18, 5,344 people (7.4%) aged 18 to 24, 23,022 people (31.9%) aged 25 to 44, 19,358 people (26.8%) aged 45 to 64, and 6,909 people (9.6%) who were 65 or older. The median age was 37.6 years. For every 100 females, there were 114.1 males. For every 100 females age 18 and over, there were 117.9 males.

There were 26,109 housing units at an average density of 1,074.4 per square mile, of the occupied units 17,442 (69.9%) were owner-occupied and 7,509 (30.1%) were rented. The homeowner vacancy rate was 1.9%; the rental vacancy rate was 5.2%. 47,982 people (66.5% of the population) lived in owner-occupied housing units and 17,261 people (23.9%) lived in rental housing units.

== Economy ==
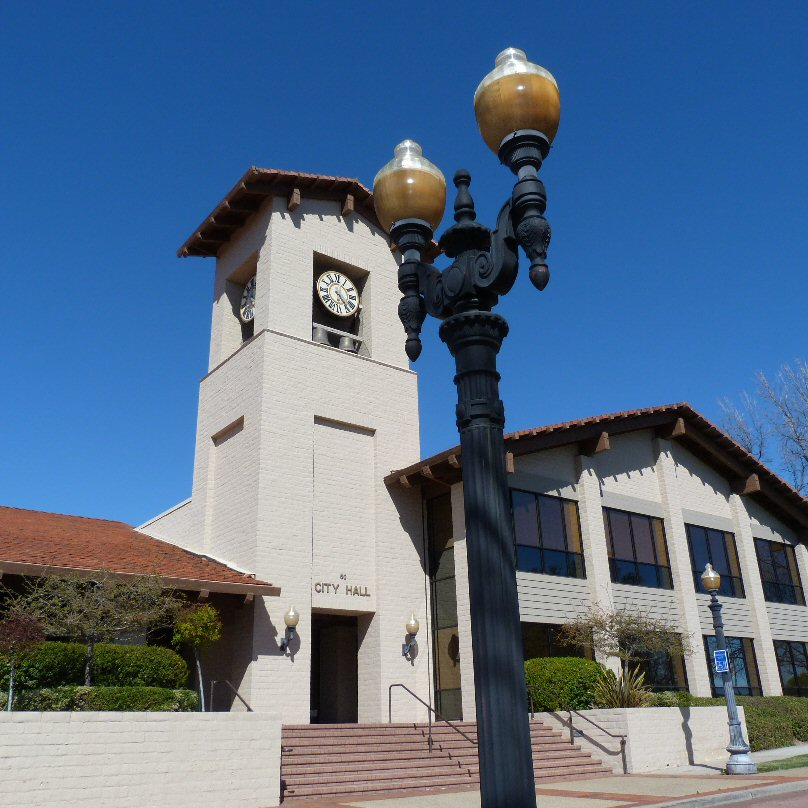
Folsom City Hall

=== Top employers ===
According to the city's 2020 Comprehensive Annual Financial Report, the top employers in the city are:

#	Employer	Employees	Percentage of Total City Employment
1	Intel Corporation	6,318	17.80%
2	California State Prison, Sacramento	1,469	4.14%
3	Folsom Cordova Unified School District	1,112	3.13%
4	Folsom State Prison	1,069	3.01%
5	Mercy Hospital of Folsom	755	2.13%
6	California ISO	638	1.80%
7	City of Folsom	452	1.27%
8	SAFE Credit Union	355	1.00%
9	Micron Technology, Inc.	350	0.99%
10	Costco	300	0.85%

The total Folsom labor force is 35,500, approximately 59.6% of the total adult population asset of around 59,740.

== Arts and culture ==
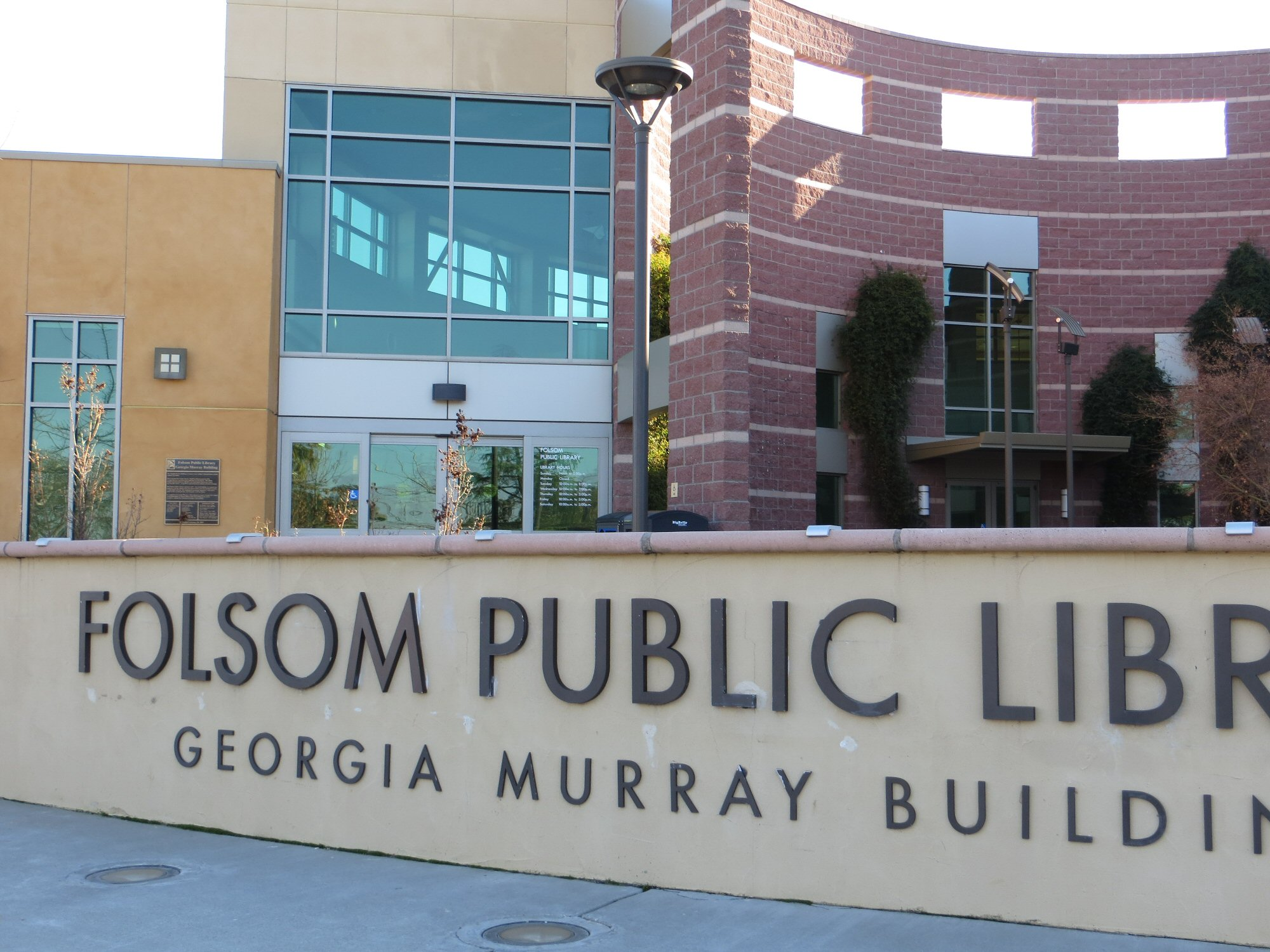
The Georgia Murray Building

The city operates the Folsom Public Library, located in the Georgia Murray Building. Another branch is planned to be built in the newly constructed Folsom Ranch Town Center, alongside with a community center.

== Parks and recreation ==
Livermore Community Park is located in Folsom and offers sports facilities and a water park. Folsom also boasts over fifty miles of trails, including the Humbug-Willow Creek Trail, Folsom Parkway Rail Trail, Lake Natoma Trail, and Oak Parkway Trail. The 32-mile American River Bike Trail, which starts in Sacramento, runs through Folsom along Lake Natoma. Bridges located in Folsom include Lake Natoma Crossing, the Rainbow Bridge, the Historic Truss Bridge, and Folsom Lake Crossing. There is also a pedestrian bridge over East Bidwell Street that opened on November 6, 2010, as part of a new segment on the Humbug-Willow Creek Trail. Another bridge was built over Folsom Lake Crossing in 2014 as part of the Johnny Cash Trail, a public art experience and bike trail honoring the singer Johnny Cash, which was opened on October 14, 2017.

Folsom also includes part of the Folsom Lake State Recreation Area, which is popular for hiking, boating, fishing, and biking, and a major attraction in the Sacramento region.

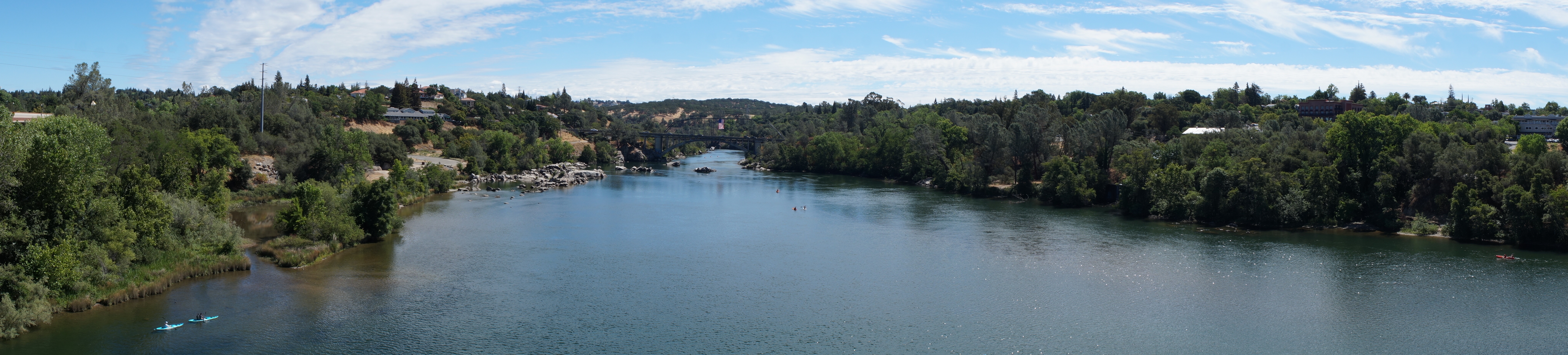
Looking east from Lake Natoma Crossing Bridge. Historic Folsom is on the right.

== Government ==
In the California State Legislature, Folsom is in the 6th senatorial district, represented by Republican Roger Niello, and in the 7th Assembly district, represented by Republican Josh Hoover.

Located within California's 3rd congressional district, Folsom is represented in the U.S. House of Representatives by Republican Kevin Kiley.

United States presidential election results for Folsom, California
Year	Republican		Democratic		Third party(ies)	
Year	No.	%	No.	%	No.	%
2000	12,922	60.74%	7,638	35.90%	713	3.35%
2004	17,234	63.23%	9,808	35.98%	214	0.79%
2008	16,492	53.21%	14,020	45.24%	481	1.55%
2012	16,831	55.41%	12,818	42.20%	727	2.39%
2016	14,957	46.09%	15,118	46.59%	2,375	7.32%
2020	19,303	45.25%	22,254	52.17%	1,099	2.58%
2024	19,635	44.82%	22,438	51.22%	1,734	3.96%

== Education ==
Folsom Lake College is a public community college which is part of the Los Rios Community College District.

Folsom Cordova Unified School District operates public schools in Folsom and Rancho Cordova. The two high schools are Folsom High School and Vista del Lago High School. The two middle schools are Folsom Middle School and Sutter Middle School.

== Infrastructure ==
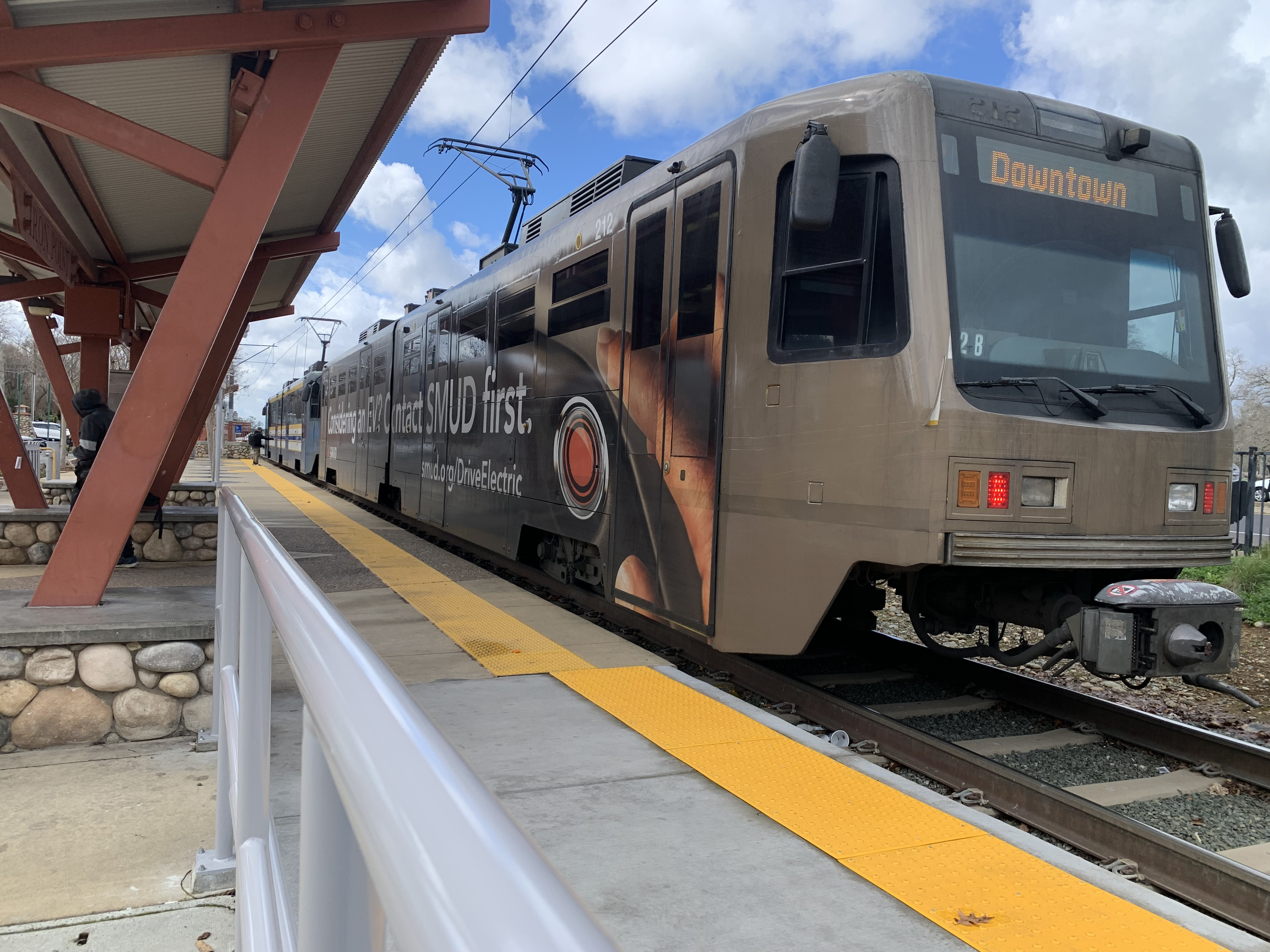
SacRT Gold Line CAF S/200 at Iron Point station in Folsom

The Sacramento Regional Transit District extended the light rail train system to Folsom via an extension to the Gold Line in October 2005, providing direct service to Downtown Sacramento. Regional Transit also operates the Folsom Stage Line, a public bus service within the city of Folsom.

In February 2020, 75 project customers, including the City of Folsom, received permanent federal water contracts for the Central Valley Project.

== Notable people ==
- Britani Bateman – actress, singer, and cast member on The Real Housewives of Salt Lake City
- Shadrack Biwott – American long-distance runner
- Mary Katharine Brandegee – botanist
- Jake Browning – Tampa Bay Buccaneers quarterback
- Peter Camejo – Green Party activist
- Denver S. Church – politician, Member of the U.S. House of Representatives
- Ben Deeley – silent film actor
- McKenzie Forbes – WNBA player for the Los Angeles Sparks
- Spider Jorgensen – Major League Baseball player
- Aspen Ladd – MMA fighter, formerly fought in the UFC, currently fighting in Bellator MMA
- Brennan Poole – NASCAR driver
- Jordan Richards – free agent safety
- Jonah Williams – Arizona Cardinals offensive lineman

== In popular culture ==
The song "Folsom Prison Blues" by Johnny Cash is about Folsom State Prison.

The films Another 48 Hrs., American Me, and No Address featured Folsom as a filming location.

== Sister cities ==
- Crespano del Grappa, Italy
- Jiaohe City, China
