= Folsom High School =

Location
- 1655 Iron Point Road; Folsom, California 95630; United States, United States; 38.649°N 121.156°W

Information
- Type: Public
- Established: 1922; 104 years ago
- School district: Folsom Cordova Unified S.D.
- NCES School ID: 01570
- Principal: Howard Cadenhead
- Teaching staff: 112.09 (FTE)
- Grades: 9–12
- Age range: 14–18
- Enrollment: 2,806 (2024-2025)
- Student to teacher ratio: 25.03
- Colors: Blue, white, and red
- Mascot: Bulldog
- National ranking: 1403
- Newspaper: The Bulldog Times
- Yearbook: El Oro
- Website: fhs.fcusd.org

Folsom High School is a public secondary school in the Western United States, located in Folsom, California, a suburb east of Sacramento. Established 104 years ago in 1922, it is a part of the Folsom Cordova Unified School District.

== School history ==
The first campus constructed for Folsom High School was at 715 Riley Street, the current home of Sutter Middle School. Before Folsom High existed, students in Folsom attended San Juan High School on Greenback Lane in Citrus Heights. A major fire on June 22, 1959 destroyed most of the original buildings on the Folsom High School campus on Riley Street. The new Folsom High campus on Iron Point Road opened in August 1998 for junior and senior students only. Freshmen and sophomore students remained at the old Riley Street campus until the second phase of the construction of the new campus was completed in 2000.

Folsom High School participates in the Academic Decathlon competition and has won first place awards in Sacramento County in both 2022 and 2023. In 2023, Folsom High School placed 9th overall in the California State Championship while competing in Division 1. In 2024, the school placed first in Sacramento County and 13th in the State Championship. In 2026, Folsom High School placed 1st in Sacramento County, and will play in the state championship later this year.

== Demographics ==
Race/Ethnicity as of 2019-2020
Group	Number of Students	Percentage
Total	2549	100%
White	1324	51.92%
Asian	617	24.25%
Hispanic	354	13.93%
Two or More Races	165	6.44%
Black	70	2.71%
Native Hawaiian/Pacific Islander	22	0.47%
American Indian/Alaska Native	75	0.27%

Gender as of 2019-2020
Group	Number of Students	Percentage
Total	2548	100%
Female	1280	50.24%
Male	1268	49.76%

== Athletics ==
In 2006 and 2008, the varsity cheerleading squad took second place in the Universal Cheerleading Association's high school national championship, runner-up to Colleyville Heritage of Texas in 2006 and Paul Laurence Dunbar of Kentucky in 2008.

In 2010, the football team defeated Gardena 48–20 for the CIF Division II state championship. The team was led by future NFL safety Jordan Richards and star quarterback Dano Graves. Graves was named the MaxPreps National Player of the Year in 2010.

In 2013, FHS quarterback Jake Browning was named the state Gatorade Player of the Year. He led the Bulldogs to another section championship and the California Interscholastic Federation (CIF) Northern California regional championship game, but fell to De La Salle of Concord.

In 2014, the football team defeated Oceanside 68–7 for the CIF Division I state championship, their second state title in four years. The Team went undefeated for the season (16-0). The Bulldogs finished fourth in the nation on the Xcellent 25, presented by the Army National Guard.

In 2017, the football team defeated Helix High School 49–42 for the CIF Division I state championship. The team went undefeated (16–0) for the year.

In 2018, the football team defeated Cathedral Catholic High School 21–14 to repeat as CIF Division I state champions, the fourth state title in 9 years.

In 2023, the football team defeated St. Bonaventure High School 20–14 to win the CIF Division 1-A state championship. This was their fifth state title since 2010 and first since 2018.

On December 12, 2025, Folsom won the Division I-AA state football championship by defeating Cathedral Catholic High School 42–28.

== Notable alumni ==
- Elijhah Badger, professional football wide-receiver
- John Briggs, former professional baseball player (Chicago Cubs, Cleveland Indians, Kansas City Athletics)
- Jake Browning, quarterback for the Cincinnati Bengals
- Virgil Carter, former professional football quarterback (Cleveland Browns, Cincinnati Bengals)
- Mike Cather, former professional baseball player (Atlanta Braves)
- Mara Davi, Broadway actress and dancer
- Joseph James DeAngelo, serial killer
- Josiah Deguara, tight end for the Green Bay Packers
- Mason Forbes, basketball player for the Saint Mary's Gaels
- Jordan Ford, professional basketball player (Sacramento Kings)
- John Jones, a professional soccer player
- Spider Jorgensen, former Major League Baseball player (Brooklyn Dodgers, New York Giants)
- Walker Lyons, college football tight end
- Austin Mack, college football quarterback
- Ryan Rau, former linebacker for the Miami Dolphins
- Jordan Richards, former professional football safety (New England Patriots, Baltimore Ravens)
- Jaylen Wells, professional basketball player (Memphis Grizzlies)
- Jonah Williams, offensive tackle for the Cincinnati Bengals
