= List of SacRT bus routes =

This is a list of bus routes operated by the Sacramento Regional Transit District (SacRT). In 2025, these routes had a ridership of 9,907,100, or about 33,600 per weekday as of the second quarter of 2026.

== Regular routes ==
Route number	Route name	Area served	Light rail station(s)	Weekday service	Saturday service	Sunday/holiday service	Additional info
1	Greenback	Sunrise Mall, San Juan High School, Greenback San Juan Center, Creekside Center, American River College, Discovery Museum	Watt/I-80	5 am – 10:30 pm	5:30 am – 9:30 pm	5:30 am – 9:30 pm	Created in 1990 as part of the Beltline (from portions of former routes 70 and 90). Formerly operated to Mather Field/Mills LRT (now covered by route #21).
11	Natomas/Land Park	Inderkum High School, Park Place, Sleep Train Arena, Natomas Marketplace, Natomas High School, Stone Creek Plaza/Discovery Center, Downtown Commons, California State Capitol, Downtown (3rd & J), Greyhound Station	7th & Richards, 8th & H, 7th & I, 8th & K, St. Rose of Lima Park, City College	6 am – 7:30 pm	7 am – 8 pm	7 am – 8 pm	Created on June 15, 2003. In September 2019, line 11 was extended south to City College via Riverside, Vallejo Way, Land Park, and Sutterville in September 2019, replacing part of line 6, as line 6 was reduced to peak only service and renumbered line 106.
13	Natomas/Arden	Natomas Marketplace, Sleep Train Arena, Northgate, Arden Way, Uptown Sacramento, Arden Fair Mall, Encina High School, Arden Watt Marketplace, Kaiser Sacramento, Country Club Plaza/Country Club Centre	Arden/Del Paso	6 am – 9:30 pm	7 am – 10 pm	7 am – 10 pm	On September 8, 2019, line 13 was rerouted west on San Juan from Northgate to Truxel, extended north on Truxel and west on Del Paso, and was extended east replacing line 22 with an extension further east to Butano & El Camino as part of SacRT Forward. Line 113, which was created on September 8, 2019, as part of SacRT Forward, covers service on along North Market, and follows the old route of line 13, with a rerouting directly on North Market rather than via National and Sierra Point, and service on Gateway Parkway was discontinued.
15	Del Paso Heights	Grant Union High School, Del Paso Heights, Uptown Sacramento, Downtown Commons, California State Capitol, Downtown (8th & O) via Grand & Rio Linda	Watt/I-80, Arden/Del Paso, Globe, 7th & Richards, 7th & I, 8th & K, St. Rose of Lima Park	5:30 am – 9 pm	6:30 am – 9:30 pm	8 am – 9:30 pm	Along with the Rio Linda Blvd segment, line 15 also operated on T Street from 8th/9th Streets in Downtown Sacramento, through Elmhurst, to the Tahoe Park area. Prior to 1980, the T Street portion was part of line 4, which operated between West Sacramento (East Yolo) and Tahoe Park. Line 15 operated along T Street from Downtown Sacramento to Tahoe Park between 1979 and 2003. This portion of line 15 was replaced by former line 37 on September 28, 2003. The section of line 15 south of Arden/Del Paso was discontinued on September 8, 2019, as part of SacRT Forward; alternative service is available on the Blue Line and line 11. That same day, line 15 was renamed from Rio Linda Blvd-O St to Del Paso Heights.
19	Rio Linda	Watt Towne Center, Elverta Crossing/Walmart, Center High School, Gibson Ranch County Park, Rio Linda, Rio Linda Plaza, Rio Linda High School, Del Paso Heights, Uptown Sacramento, Elverta Road	Watt/I-80, Arden/Del Paso	5:30 am – 9 pm	7 am – 8 pm	7 am – 7:30 pm	Line 19 once continued along Watt Avenue to Country Club Plaza area and to Kaiser Medical Center on Morse Avenue. Service south of the Watt/I-80 LRT station was discontinued in 1990. On September 8, 2019, line 19 was rerouted directly on Rio Linda between Bell and Elkhorn, and was also rerouted from 10th Street east on O Street, south on Dry Creek, east on Elkhorn, and north on Watt as part of SacRT Forward. Service on Claire and Dry Creek between Bell and Elkhorn and from O Street to Watt via 10th Street, Q Street, Rio Linda, Elverta was eliminated. Service via Watt south of Elkhorn was eliminated; alternative service is available on lines 26 and 84.
21	Sunrise	Mills Center, Cordova High School, Sunriver Village Shopping Center, Gold River Town Center, Fair Oaks Village, Sunrise Village/Quail Pointe Shopping Center, Sunrise Mall, Copperwood Square Shopping Center, Louis & Orlando transfer point via Sunrise	Mather Field/Mills	6 am – 10:45 pm	6 am – 10:30 pm	7 am – 10 pm	Line 21 is the former portion of line 1 that originally operated between Sunrise Mall and Butterfield (later, Mather Field/Mills) station. Created on July 21, 2004. On January 6, 2008, line 21 was extended north to the Louis and Orlando transit center in Roseville, replacing line 91.
23	El Camino	Sunrise Mall, San Juan High School, Greenback San Juan Center, Carmichael Village, Carmichael Oaks Shopping Center, El Camino High School, Country Club Plaza/Country Club Centre, Arden Fair Mall, Uptown Sacramento	Arden/Del Paso	5 am – 10:30 pm	6:30 am – 9 pm	6:30 am – 9:30 pm	Line 88 took over the West El Camino Avenue portion of line 23 in 1991. Prior to 1980, line 23 continued to Folsom. Line 23 was rerouted from Ethan Way to Howe Ave via Alta Arden Way on September 8, 2019, as part of SacRT Forward.
25	Marconi	Sunrise Mall, Sunrise Village/Quail Pointe Shopping Center, Madison & Dewey Marketplace, Mercy San Juan Medical Center, Madison Square, Crestview Village Shopping Center, Carmichael Village, Carmichael Oaks Shopping Center, Town & Country Village	Marconi/Arcade	5:30 am – 11 pm	8 am – 10:45 pm	7 am – 9:15 pm	Service via Madison to Sunrise Mall was eliminated on September 8, 2019, as part of SacRT Forward (transfer to line 1 to get to Sunrise Mall; use SmaRT Ride Microtransit or walk from line 25 to get to Madison). Line 25 was instead rerouted to go from Coyle & Dewey north on Dewey, continuing onto Van Maren, and north on Auburn to Louis/Orlando transit center, replacing a portion of line 93, which was rerouted.
26	Fulton	McClellan Business Park, Town & Country Village, Loehmann's Plaza, Pavilions, CSU Sacramento	University/65th Street, Watt/I-80	6 am – 11 pm	8 am – 10:45 pm	8 am – 9:15 pm	Service extended north on Watt to Elverta on September 8, 2019, as part of SacRT Forward (replacing a portion of line 19, which was rerouted).
30	J St.	CSU Sacramento Transit Center, Mercy General Hospital, Sutter General Hospital, Sutter's Fort State Historic Park, Lavender Heights, Sacramento Convention Center, Downtown Sacramento, Downtown Commons	8th & K, St. Rose of Lima Park, 7th & I, Sacramento Valley	6 am – 9:45 pm	6:30 am – 9:30 pm	6:30 am – 9:30 pm	On September 8, 2019, line 30 was rerouted in downtown to follow 39th Street and L Street westbound rather than going by Capitol Mall and following J Street all the way to 9th Street as part of SacRT Forward; line 30 also began to be shared with line 38. Also, line 30 started to be shared with line 38.
38	Tahoe Park	UC Davis Medical Center, Downtown Commons, California State Capitol, Broadway & 8th via Downtown	University/65th Street, 29th Street, St. Rose of Lima Park, 8th & O, Sacramento Valley	5:30 am – 10:15 pm	6:45 am – 9:15 pm	6:30 am – 9:30 pm	Formally line 8. Changed to line 38 in September 1982. On September 8, 2019, line 38 was rerouted from 39th & Stockton to turn north on 39th and go west on J/L Street to downtown; outbound trips from Sacramento Valley follow H Street and 6th Street directly to J Street; line 38 also began to be shared with line 30. The Downtown SmaRT Ride zone extended to cover the deleted portions. The name was changed from line 38 P/Q streets to line 38 Tahoe Park.
51	Stockton/Broadway	Florin Towne Centre, Fruitridge Shopping Center, Downtown Commons, California State Capitol, Downtown (7th & G)	8th & O, 7th-8th & Capitol, St. Rose of Lima Park, Broadway	5:30 am – 10:30 pm	6 am – 9 pm	7 am – 9:30 pm	At one time, operated along Fruitridge Road from Stockton Blvd to Power Inn Road. Also served the Glen Elder neighborhood prior to the late 1990s.
56	Meadowview	Cosumnes River College, Methodist Hospital of Sacramento, Kaiser South Sacramento, Southpointe Plaza, South Center/Valley Shopping Center, The Promenade, Pocket Transit Center	Meadowview	5:45 am – 10:30 pm	8 am – 10:30 pm	7:30 am – 9:15 pm	Line 56 was created in 1992, to provide all-day service between Downtown Sacramento and Elk Grove, via Laguna Creek. In the fall of 2003, line service to Downtown Sacramento was discontinued, due to the opening of the new Blue Line segment to Meadowview. On September 8, 2019, line 56 was rerouted via Brookfield and Franklin rather than on Mack Rd between Brookfield and Franklin as part of SacRT Forward, replacing line 47, which was discontinued.
61	Fruitridge	Fruitridge Shopping Center, South Land Park & 35th via Fruitridge	Power Inn, College Greens, Fruitridge	5:45 am – 9:15 pm	7 am – 9 pm	7 am – 8:15 pm	Originally operated as the Freeport-Fruitridge line from 1974 to 2003. Formerly served McMahon Drive and Lemon Hill Avenue, and terminated at Florin Mall (now Florin Towne Centre). Aligned along its current segment since 2003, due to the opening of the Blue Line light rail segment to Meadowview. On September 8, 2019, line 61 was rerouted to turn south on Power Inn and replaced part of line 65 to Florin Towne Centre as part of SacRT Forward. Service on Fruitridge east of Power Inn and on Florin-Perkins from Belvedere to Fruitridge was discontinued. Service from College Greens station to Belvedere Ave at Florin-Perkins Road is available on line 161 (which was created on September 8, 2019, as part of SacRT Forward). Alternative service from Power Inn and Fruitridge to College Greens is available by transfer to line 81 northbound, and then transfer to the Gold Line eastbound. That same day, also as part of SacRT Forward, line 61 extended west via 43rd and Riverside Drive, then west on Gloria and replaced part of line 2 to Pocket Transit Center; line 2 was renumbered to line 102 and was reduced to peak service only.
62	Freeport	Pocket Transit Center, The Promenade, Sacramento City College, McClatchy High School, Lavender Heights, Downtown Commons, California State Capitol, Downtown (3rd & J)	4th Avenue/Wayne Hultgren, Broadway, St. Rose of Lima Park	5:45 am – 9:30 pm	7 am – 10 pm	7:15 am – 10 pm	Line 62 formerly operated as the Freeport – Florin line from 1974 to 2003. Line 62 served Florin Road between Stockton Blvd and South Land Park Drive before being rerouted on its current alignment in the fall of 2003. On September 8, 2019, line 62 was rerouted west from 43rd & 13th Street to continue west on 43rd and then turn south on Land Park Drive as part of SacRT Forward, replacing part of line 6; line 6 was renumbered to line 106 and was reduced to peak service only.
67	Franklin	Arden Fair Mall, Cal Expo, Sutter General Hospital, Sutter's Fort State Historic Park, Sacramento Charter High School, Southgate, Florin Towne Centre via Franklin	29th Street	5 am – 10:45 pm	6:30 am – 10 pm	7 am – 10 pm	Shared with Route 68. Was line 72 prior to September 1982. Prior to 1990, line 67 (along with line 68) operated to Downtown Sacramento, inbound via 30th Street, K Street, 28th Street, I Street, 15th Street, L Street, terminating on 3rd Street before J Street; outbound trips originated at 3rd and J Streets and traveled east on J Street to 29th Street. On September 8, 2019, line 67 was realigned off of Florin (use line 81 for alternative service on Florin) and was rerouted south via Franklin, east on Mack and on an identical routing to line 56 from there to Cosumnes River College as part of SacRT Forward, replacing part of line 65, which was discontinued.
68	Oak Park	Arden Fair Mall, Cal Expo, Sutter General Hospital, Sutter's Fort State Historic Park, Sacramento Charter High School, Florin Towne Centre via MLK & 44th, Vineyard Square/Power Inn Center, Southpointe Plaza, Kaiser South Sacramento, Methodist Hospital of Sacramento, Cosumnes River College	29th Street	5:30 am – 11:15 pm	7:15 am – 10 pm	7 am – 9:45 pm	Shared with Route 67. Was line 71 prior to September 1982. On September 8, 2019, line 68 was rerouted off of Steiner and Sky Parkway (these areas lost service); line 68 instead was rerouted to continue east on 47th and then turn south on Stockton instead. Line 68 extended south via the current line 55, except that line 68 was extended via Florin and Palmer House rather than Florin Mall Drive, Orange Avenue, Chandler Drive, and Lindale Drive.
72	Rosemont	Folsom Lake College (Rancho Cordova Center Campus), Bradville Square/Bradshaw Marketplace, Rosemont High School, Rosemont Plaza	Mather Fields/Mills, Watt/Manlove	5:45 am – 9:30 pm	8 am – 7:30 pm	8 am – 6:30 pm	Created on September 6, 1998; part replaced the old route of line 28 (which was rerouted to replace line 78). In September 2019, Saturday service will extend to 7 am – 9:30 pm, and Sunday service will extend to 7 am – 9 pm.
75	Mather	VA Sacramento, Folsom Lake College (Rancho Cordova Center Campus), Mather Airport	Mather Field/Mills	6:30 am – 7:30 pm	7:30 am – 6 pm	7:30 am – 6 pm	Loop service; created on June 17, 2001. On September 8, 2019, line 75 extended southwest to Butterfield station as part of SacRT Forward, replacing part of line 28, which was discontinued. That same day, also as part of SacRT Forward, line 75 from Mather Field & Rockingham was rerouted to go southwest on Rockingham, and continue via Old Placerville, Schriever, Armstrong, Bleckley, McCuen, Femoyer, International, Data, and Capital Center, replacing part of line 74, which was discontinued.
78	Butterfield	Folsom Bl	Butterfield, Mather Field/Mills	6a–8p	8a–8p	8a–8p	
81	Florin	Florin & Riverside, John F. Kennedy High School (Sacramento), Lake Crest Village Shopping Center, Luther Burbank High School, Southgate Plaza, Florin Towne Centre, Hiram W. Johnson High School	University/65th Street	5:15 am – 11 pm	6:15 am – 10:30 pm	6:15 am – 9 pm	Operated from Greenhaven to Roseville, via CSUS, Kaiser Hospital Sacramento Medical Center, American River College, Mercy San Juan Hospital, and Sunrise Mall from circa 1974 to 1977. Line later shortened to Sunrise Mall in the late 1970s, and then shortened again to American River College in September 1982. Line then shortened along its current alignment on September 3, 2000, when the north half was split into line 82.
82	Northrop/Morse	American River College, Mira Loma High School, Arcade Square Shopping Center, Country Club Plaza/Country Club Centre, Kaiser Sacramento, Loehmann's Plaza, Pavilions, CSU Sacramento	University/65th Street	5 am – 11:15 pm	6 am – 10:45 pm	7:15 am – 10 pm	Created to cover half of line 81 on September 3, 2000. In September 2019, line 82 was rerouted from Whitney & Mission to Winding Way & College Oak to go east on Whitney, north on Walnut, and west on Winding Way. The old route north on Mission, west on Engle, north on Eastern, east on Edison, north on Mission, and east on Winding Way lost service.
84	Watt	Watt & Elverta, Center High School, Elverta Crossing/Walmart, Elkhorn Shopping Center, Highlands High School, Discovery Museum, Arcade Square Shopping Center, Country Club Plaza/Country Club Centre, Kaiser Sacramento, Arden Watt Marketplace	Watt/Manlove, Starfire	5:30 am – 10:30 pm	7 am – 10:15 pm	7 am – 9:15 pm	Created in 1987. Was known as 84 Watt-North Highlands and was joined with line 80 until September 8, 2019. On September 8, 2019, line 84 was rerouted from Walerga & Antelope to continue north on Walerga and turn west on Elverta rather than following Antelope and Watt as part of SacRT Forward (line 26 covers Watt, but there is no service on Antelope), and the line was also rerouted on the south end from Watt & La Riviera east on La Rivieraand southwest on Folsom as part of SacRT Forward, replacing part of line 80, which was discontinued; line 84 covers the portion of line 80 from Rivera to Elkhorn. The line was renamed 84 Wat6
86	Grand	Grant Union High School, Del Paso Heights, Natomas High School, Downtown Commons, California State Capitol, Downtown (9th & K)	Marconi/Arcade	5:30 am – 10:15 pm	6:45 am – 9:45 pm	7 am – 9 pm	Created to cover the Marconi/Arcade to Downtown Sacramento portion of line 87 in April 2004.
87	Howe	Pavilions, CSU Sacramento	Marconi/Arcade, university/65th Street	6 am – 9:30 pm	6:45 am – 10 pm	6:45 am – 9:30 pm	Line 87 was a crosstown route, operating from Downtown Sacramento to Sacramento City College via Natomas, Del Paso Heights, Arden-Arcade, East Sacramento, Tahoe Park, and Oak Park. Line 87 replaced line 9 in June 1981. Line 87 once had service along 39th Street (between Stockton Boulevard and D Street), D Street, 46th Street, F Street (to serve the now defunct Sutter Memorial Hospital), Elvas Avenue, H Street to CSUS; this service was part of line 9 and service to Sutter Memorial Hospital was discontinued Labor Day weekend 1983. Formerly operated along line 86's current alignment (with a slight deviation). Also, line 87 continued beyond University/65th Street to Sacramento City College, via the U.C. Davis Medical Center and Central Oak Park. Line service from University/65th Street to City College was discontinued in 1996, due to coverage by (then new) line 83.
88	West El Camino	Uptown Sacramento, Stone Creek Plaza/Discovery Center, Downtown Commons, California State Capitol, Downtown (9th & K) via West El Camino Ave	Arden/Del Paso	5:45 am – 9:45 pm	6:45 am – 10 pm	7:45 am – 9:15 pm	Formerly a portion of line 23.
93	Hillsdale	Citrus Heights (Louis & Orlando), Grand Oaks Center, Costco/Walmart Citrus Heights, Creekside Center, Elkhorn Plaza, Foothill High School, Hillsdale Plaza	Watt/I-80	5:45 am – 9:45 pm	7:30 am – 8:45 pm	7:30 am – 8:45 pm	On September 8, 2019, line 93 was realigned from Andrea & Elkhorn to continue northeast on Andrea and continue via Tupelo, Antelope, and Auburn rather than via Auburn and Elkhorn as part of SacRT Forward, replacing part of line 95, which was discontinued. For service on Auburn Blvd, use realigned line 25. Use line 193 (which was renumbered from line 103 that day) for service on Elkhorn (or walk from line 1 or line 93 if line 193 does not operate at this time)
142	Airport	Downtown Sacramento, Sacramento International Airport	7th & I/County Center, 8th & Capitol, Cathedral Square, St. Rose of Lima Park	5:15 am – 10:30 pm			

== Commuter Routes ==
Route number	Route name	Area served	Light rail station(s)	Weekday service	Additional info
102	Riverside Commuter	Rush River & Windbridge, The Promenade, John F. Kennedy High School, Downtown Commons, California State Capitol, Downtown (7th & G)		5:30 – 9 am / 2:25 – 7 pm	Was line 2 Riverside before September 2019; it was renumbered and renamed as part of SacRT Forward because service was reduced to be peak only.
103	Riverside Express	Pocket & Greenhaven, John F. Kennedy High School, Downtown Commons, California State Capitol, Downtown (7th & G)	8th & O, 7th-8th & Capitol, St. Rose of Lima Park	6 – 8 am / 4– 6 pm	Was line 3 before September 2019; renumbered on September 8, 2019, as part of SacRT Forward because it is a peak only route.
105	Elsie	Meadowview, South Center/Valley Shopping Center, Southpointe Plaza, Kaiser South Sacramento, Florin High School	Meadowview	7:15 – 7:40 am / 3:40 – 4:02 pm	Service was originally numbered line 5, and line 5 (along with line #6 (now line #106)) operated from Downtown Sacramento, down Land Park/South Land Park Drives, Alma Vista Drive, to Meadowview Road and 24th Street. Service was later extended to Kaiser South Sacramento Medical Center in the early 1990s, and then to Florin High School and Old Town Elk Grove around the mid-1990s. Line 5 was renumbered line 105 Elsie on September 8, 2019, as part of SacRT Forward because service was reduced to be peak only.
106	Land Park Commuter	Rush River & Windbridge – Downtown (7th & G)	8th & O, 7th-8th & Capitol, St. Rose of Lima Park	5:30 am – 8 pm	Was line 6 Land Park until September 8, 2019; it was renumbered and renamed as part of SacRT Forward because service was reduced to be peak only.
109	Hazel Express	Cable Park Shopping Center/Walmart, Madison Marketplace, Nimbus Dam Recreation Area, California State Capitol, Midtown Sacramento, Downtown Sacramento, Downtown Commons	8th & O, 7th-8th & Capitol, St. Rose of Lima Park	6:30 – 7:30 am / 4:30 – 6:30 pm	Line once ended at the Butterfield LRT.
113	North Market Commuter	Natomas Marketplace, Sleep Train Arena, Northgate	Arden/Del Paso	6:30 am – 5:30 pm	Created on September 8, 2019, as part of SacRT Forward to replace service on route 13 as part of SacRT Forward.
124	Sunrise Commuter	Greenback Ln, Sunrise Bl, Rancho Cordova City Hall, Rancho Cordova VA Hospital	Sunrise	5:45 –8:30 am / 4:15 – 7 pm	
129	Arden Commuter	Dewey & Madison, Del Campo High School, Carmichael Oaks Shopping Center, Arden Watt Marketplace, Arden Fair Mall, Governor's Mansion State Historic Park, Wells Fargo Pavilion, Downtown Commons, Downtown Sacramento (8th & O)	7th & I, 8th & K, St. Rose of Lima Park	6:20 am – 7:40 am/4:30-6 pm	Created circa 1974 as a local line for Arden Way. Operated from Fair Oaks to Downtown Sacramento. In September 2019, line 29 was renumbered line 129 as part of SacRT Forward because it is a peak only route.
133	Union Gospel Mission to E St & 12th	Union Gospel Mission, Downtown Sacramento	Alkali Flat/La Valentina	6:15 am	Operates one trip per day.
134	McKinley Commuter	CSUS, Sutter Memorial Hospital, Downtown Commons, Downtown (8th & O),	7th & I, 8th & K, St. Rose of Lima Park, Sacramento Valley	6 am – 9 am, 2:30 pm – 6 pm	Was originally numbered line 1. Line 1 was renumbered line 34 on Labor Day Weekend 1982. Line 34 also operated along Folsom Blvd and Capitol Avenue from Downtown Sacramento to University/65th Street until September 1992, and was called 34 Folsom – McKinley. After September 1992, former line 36 took over bus service along the Folsom/Capitol segment, and the lber 2019, line 34 was renumbered line 134 as part of SacRT forward because service was reduced to be peak only. The bus route will be realigned off of Coloma Way and Pala Way to use the new 53rd Street extension through former Sutter Hospital site, upon construction.
137	UC Davis/Elk Grove				
138	Causeway Connection	Downtown Davis, UC Davis Medical Center		5:30 am – 9 pm	Operations partnership with YoloBus and UC Davis Uses Proterra Catalyst battery electric buses featuring WiFi and USB charging ports.
161	Belvedere				
175	Rancho CordoVan-Sunridge	Douglas Rd, Sunrise Bl, Kilgore Rd	Zinfandel	6a–9a, 3p–7p	
176	Rancho CordoVan-Kavala	Zinfandel Dr, Douglas Rd, Rancho Cordova Pkwy, Sunrise Bl	Zinfandel	5:30a–8a, 4p–7p	
177	Rancho CordoVan-Villages	Zinfandel Dr, White Rock, Prospect Park Dr, Baroque Dr	Zinfandel	6a–7p	

== Non-SacRT Routes ==
This is a list of bus routes that SacRT operates for other transit agencies.

Route number	Route name	Agency	Area Served	Regular Service	Frequency	Saturday service	Sunday/holiday service
10-FSL	Historic Folsom / Iron Point	Folsom Stage Line	Historic Folsom station, Folsom Lake College, Kaiser Medical Center, Intel, Iron Point station, Folsom High School, American River Canyon	5:30 am - 7 pm	every 60 mins	none	
20-FSL	School Route	Folsom Stage Line	Vista del Lago High School (Folsom, California), Folsom Lake College	7 am - 7:45 am, 2 pm - 2:30 pm (We,) 3:45 pm – 4:20 pm (Mo, Tu, Th, Fr)	every 15 mins	none	
30-FSL	Glenn Light Rail	Folsom Stage Line	Glenn station, Folsom City Hall, Folsom State Prison	6 am - 8 am, 2:35 pm – 4:45 pm	every 20 mins	none	
E10	Big Horn & Civic Center to P St	E-tran	Elk Grove, California, Sacramento, California (commute route)	5:30 am – 7:30 am (to P Street) 3:30 pm – 5:30 pm (to Big Horn)	every 60 mins	none	
E11	Franklin High School to 29th St Station	E-tran	Elk Grove, California, Sacramento, California (commute route)	6 am - 7:50 am (to 29th Street) 3:30 pm - 6 pm (to Franklin High)	every 30 mins	none	
E12	Big Horn & Civic Center to 29th St Station	E-tran	Elk Grove, California, Sacramento, California (commute route)	6 am - 7:45 am (to 29th Street) 4 pm - 5:30 pm (to Big Horn)	every 30 mins	none	
E13	Elkmont to P St	E-tran	Elk Grove, California, Sacramento, California (commute route)	5:45 am – 7:15 am (to P Street) 3:40 pm – 5:15 pm (to Elkmont)	every 30 mins	none	
E14	Big Horn & Bruceville to 29th St Station	E-tran	Elk Grove, California, Sacramento, California (commute route)	5:45 am – 7:45 am (to 29th Street) 3:45 pm – 5:40 pm (to Big Horn)	every 60 mins	none	
E15	Bond to P St	E-tran	Elk Grove, California, Sacramento, California (commute route)	6:15 am – 7:45 am (to P Street) 4:10 pm – 5:40 pm (to Bond Road)	every 30 mins	none	
E16	Clarke Farms to P St	E-tran	Elk Grove, California, Sacramento, California (commute route)	6:30 am - 8 am (to P Street) 4 pm - 5:30 pm (to Clarke Farms)	every 30 mins	none	
E17	Armand George to P St	E-tran	Elk Grove, California, Sacramento, California (commute route)	6:30 am – 8:20 am (to P Street) 4:10 pm – 6:10 pm (to Armand George)	every 60 mins	none	
E18	Q St to Longleaf	E-tran	Elk Grove, California, Sacramento, California (commute route)	6:40 am – 7:30 am (to Longleaf) 4:40 pm – 5:15 pm (to Q Street)	one time	none	
E19	Harbor Point to Butterfield station	E-tran	Elk Grove, California, Sacramento, California (commute route)	4:45 am – 7:50 am, 3:30 pm (to Butterfield) 5:45 am, 2:40 pm – 5:50 pm (to Harbor Point)	every 60 mins (one time at 3:30 pm to Butterfield and 5:45 to Harbor Point)	none	
E110	Sky River Casino to Cosumnes River College	E-tran	Sky River Casino, Kaiser Permanente (2 locations), Cosumnes Oaks High School, Elk Grove Auto Mall, Cinemark Century Laguna, Sutter Health, WinCo Foods, Cosumnes River College	6 am - 10 pm	every 30 mins (regular,) every 60 mins (Sat)	6:30 am – 6:30 pm	none
E111	Laguna Main St to Big Horn & Civic Center (Cosumnes Oaks High School)	E-tran	Laguna West, Safeway, Raley's (Elk Grove Blvd), Franklin, Franklin High School, Walmart, Cosumnes Oaks High School	6 am - 8 pm	every 90 mins	none	
E112	Laguna Main St to Big Horn & Civic Center (Cosumnes Oaks High School)	E-tran	Laguna West, Safeway, Raley's (Elk Grove Blvd), Arlene Hein Elementary, Costco, District56	6:25 am – 7:45 pm	every 60 mins	none	
E113	Laguna Main St to Elkmont	E-tran	Laguna West, Safeway, Target (Laguna Blvd), Highway 99, Elk Grove City Hall, Elk Grove Police Department, Highway 99 (Loop), Elk Grove High School, Elk Grove Animal Services, Amazon	6:50 am - 8 pm	every 60 mins (regular,) every 30 mins (Sat)	7:45 am - 6 pm	none
E114	Laguna Main St to Armand George	E-tran	Laguna West, Safeway, Wackford Aquatic Center, Cosumnes River College, Target (Cosumnes River), Lowe's, Monterey Trail High School (North End), Vineyard, Sheldon High School	6:20 am – 7:45 pm	every 60 mins (regular,) every 30 mins (Sat)	7:50 am – 6:15 pm	none
E115	Cosumnes River College to Clarke Farms	E-tran	Cosumnes River College, Lowe's, Monterey Trail High School (South End), Vineyard, Pleasant Grove High School, Clarke Farms	7:30 am - 8 pm	every 60 mins	none	
E116	Clarke Farms to Cosumnes River College	E-tran	Clarke Farms, Bel-Air (Elk Grove Blvd), Joseph Kerr Middle School, Highway 99, Walmart (Elk Grove Blvd), Costco, Nugget Markets, Harriet Eddy Middle School, Target (Laguna Blvd), Cosumnes River College	6 am - 8:30 pm	every 60 mins	7:30 am – 6:30 pm	none

== Former routes ==
=== Contracted shuttle services ===
These shuttles are operated by RT through a partnership with cities of Rancho Cordova, Granite Park, and North Natomas

=== Capital City hospital shuttles ===
Shuttle buses that provide service to/from RT LT stations to the hospitals within the Central area.

Route number	Route name	Area served	RT Light Rail station(s)	Weekday service	Saturday service	Sunday/holiday service	Additional info
SG	Sutter General/29th Shuttle	Sutter General Hospital	29th	6 am – 7 pm			
SM	Sutter Memorial/65th Shuttle	Sutter Memorial Hospital	University/65th	6 am – 7 pm			
SMCS	Sutter Medical Center Shuttle	Sutter General Hospital, Sutter Memorial Hospital		6 am – 7 pm			
UCDMC	UC Davis Medical Center	UC Davis Medical Center, Cypress Building, Lawrence J. Ellison Ambulatory Care Center	39th	6 am – 6 pm			
MGH	Mercy General Hospital		29th, 39th	5 am – 10 pm			

== School day service ==
These routes operates during the school season (September to June). These were created on January 4, 2004.

Route number	Route name	School(s) served
205	Fruitridge Rd – Freeport Blvd	California Middle School
206	12th Ave, Sutterville Rd	California Middle School
210	La Riviera & Watt	Kit Carson and Miwok Middle School
211	College Greens -	Kit Carson and Miwok Middle School
212	14th Ave & 21St Ave	Kit Carson Middle School
213	Fruitridge Rd & Stockton Blvd	Kit Carson Middle School
214	34th & T St	Kit Carson Middle School
226	Riverside & Greenhaven Dr	Miwok Middle School
227	South Land Park & Greenhaven Dr	Miwok Middle School
228	Gloria Dr & Rush River Dr	Miwok Middle School
246	Meadowview Rd & Greenhaven Dr	John F. Kennedy High School
247	Meadowview Rd & 21st St	John F. Kennedy High School
248	Meadowview Rd & Rush River Dr	John F. Kennedy High School
252	Freeport/Fruitridge/ML King	McClatchy High School
255	La Riviera Dr/College Greens	Rosemont High School

== Transit centers ==
Transit Center	Location	Bike lockers	Transfers
American River College	Location	No	1, 82
Arden Fair Mall	Location	No	22, 23, 29, 67, 68
Cosumnes River College	Location	No	54, 55, 56
CSUS	Location	No	30, 31, 34, 82, 87
Florin Mall	Location	No	47, 51, 55, 67, 68, 81
Sunrise Mall	Location	No	1, 21, 23, 24, 25, 28
Louis and Orlando	Location	No	Sacramento Regional Transit 21, 93, and 103; Roseville Transit A, B, R, and Commuter; Placer County Transit to Auburn, CA

== Non-RT routes serving Sacramento ==
Although these routes were once part of RT's lineup, these agencies continue to service Sacramento using the assigned route numbers. The RT system originally excluded service to Sacramento International Airport, which was exclusively served by Yolobus until January 2020 when RT added express service between downtown Sacramento and the airport; Yolobus continues to serve the airport with local service. Service in Elk Grove that was formerly operated by RT is operated by e-tran, which reverted to RT in June 2019. This list also include other transit agencies that coordinate their services and fares with RT.

Route number	Route name	Area served	Weekday service	Saturday service	Sunday/holiday service	Operator
39	Southport Commuter	Southport-Downtown Sacramento	AM/PM Rush Hours			Yolobus
40	West Sacramento Loop	West Sacramento-Downtown Sacramento (Counterclockwise)	5 am – 10:30 pm	7:40 am – 7 pm	8:40 am – 5:30 pm	Yolobus
41	West Sacramento Loop	West Sacramento-Downtown Sacramento (Clockwise)	6 am – 8 pm			Yolobus
42A/B	Intercity Loop	Downtown Sacramento, Airport, Woodland, Davis, West Sacramento	4:30 am – 11:45 pm	6 am – 11 pm	6 am – 11 pm	Yolobus
43	Davis-Sacramento Express	Davis-Downtown Sacramento	AM/PM rush hours			Yolobus
43B	UC Davis-Sacramento Express	UC Davis-Downtown Sacramento	AM/PM rush hours			Yolobus
44	South Davis-Sacramento Express	South Davis-Downtown Sacramento via Anderson, Cowell, and Chiles	AM/PM rush hours			Yolobus
45	Woodland-Sacramento Express	Woodland-Downtown Sacramento	AM/PM rush hours			Yolobus
52	Bighorn Express (Operated by RTA until January 2, 2005)	Downtown Sacramento	AM/PM rush hours			e-tran (To be operated by RT in 2019)
53	Whitelock Parkway-Franklin Express (Created in summer 2000; operated by RTA until January 2, 2005)	Downtown Sacramento	AM/PM rush hours			e-tran (To be operated by RT in 2019)
57	Elk Grove-Florin Express (Created on September 6, 1998; operated by RTA until January 2, 2005)	Downtown Sacramento	AM/PM rush hours			e-tran (To be operated by RT in 2019)
58	East Elk Grove Express	Downtown Sacramento	AM/PM rush hours			e-tran (To be operated by RT in 2019)
59	Old Elk Grove Express (Operated by RTA until January 2, 2005)	Downtown Sacramento	AM/PM rush hours			e-tran (To be operated by RT in 2019)
60	Elk Grove Park & Ride Express (Operated by RTA until January 2, 2005)	Downtown Sacramento	AM/PM rush hours			e-tran (To be operated by RT in 2019)
66	Elk Grove-Auto Center Express (Created on June 15, 2003; operated by RTA until January 2, 2005)	Downtown Sacramento	AM/PM rush hours			e-tran (To be operated by RT in 2019)
70	Bradshaw Express	Downtown Sacramento	AM/PM rush hours			e-tran (To be operated by RT in 2019)
71	Laguna Express	Downtown Sacramento	AM/PM rush hours			e-tran (To be operated by RT in 2019)
90	Reverse Commute	Elk Grove to Downtown Sacramento	AM/PM rush hours			e-tran (To be operated by RT in 2019)
163	Stockton – Lodi – Downtown Sacramento	Via Highway 99	AM/PM rush hours			San Joaquin Regional Transit District
165	Stockton – Downtown Sacramento via Interstate 5	Via Interstate 5	AM/PM rush hours			San Joaquin Regional Transit District
176	Sacramento 2 / Stockton – Lodi – Downtown Sacramento	Via Highway 99	AM/PM rush hours			San Joaquin Regional Transit District
230	West Davis-Sacramento	Downtown Sacramento and West Sacramento via West Capitol, Harbor, and Reed	AM/PM rush hours			Yolobus
231	Davis-Sacramento Express	Davis-Downtown Sacramento	AM/PM rush hours			Yolobus
232	Davis-Sacramento Express	Davis-Downtown Sacramento (via Anderson and Hanover)	AM/PM rush hours			Yolobus
240	West Sacramento-Sacramento	Downtown Sacramento and West Sacramento via West Capitol, Harbor, and Reed	5:30 am – 8:30 pm	7 am – 7 pm	8 am – 6 pm	Yolobus
241	Woodland-Sacramento Express	Woodland-Downtown Sacramento	AM/PM rush hours			Yolobus
242	Woodland-Sacramento Express	Woodland-Downtown Sacramento	AM/PM rush hours			Yolobus
340/340A	Raley's Landing-Downtown Sacramento	Downtown Sacramento	AM/PM rush hours			Yolobus
ATX	Sacramento Express	Sutter Creek to Downtown Sacramento	AM/PM rush hours			Amador Transit
EDC/SC	Sacramento Commuter	Sacramento to Placerville	AM/PM rush hours			El Dorado Transit
EDC/SRC	Sacramento Reverse Commuter	Placerville to Sacramento	AM/PM rush hours			El Dorado Transit
FAST/30	Fairfield-Sacramento	Fairfield, Solano, Vacaville, Dixon, Davis, Sacramento	AM/PM rush hours			Fairfield and Suisun Transit
PCE	Placer County Express	Auburn-Downtown Sacramento	AM/PM rush hours			Placer County Transit
RVT/SC	Sacramento Commuter	Roseville-Downtown Sacramento	AM/PM rush hours			Roseville Transit
YST/70	Sacramento Commuter via Highway 70	Marysville and Yuba City via Highway 70	AM/PM rush hours			Yuba-Sutter Transit
YST/99	Sacramento Commuter via Highway 99	Marysville and Yuba City via Highway 99	AM/PM rush hours			Yuba-Sutter Transit
YST/MX	Sacramento Midday Commuter	Marysville and Yuba City to Sacramento	Midday service only			Yuba-Sutter Transit
