= Broderick, California =

Broderick
- Location in California Broderick (the United States)
- Coordinates: 38°35′28″N 121°31′02″W
- Country: United States
- State: California
- County: Yolo County
- Elevation: 23 ft (7 m)

Broderick (formerly, Washington) is a former town in Yolo County, California, United States, now forming part of the City of West Sacramento. It is located just west of the Sacramento River in the eastern portion of the county. Broderick's ZIP Code is 95605 and is in area codes 916 and 279. It lies at an elevation of 23 feet (7 m).

== History ==
=== Beginnings ===
Washington was rumored to be named after George Washington because the town plan was filed by Margaret McDowell on Washington's birthday. Margaret McDowell's first husband, James McDowell, settled and developed 600 acres (2.4 km^{2}) of land on a rancho he purchased from John Schwartz in 1846. He was killed in the Spring of 1849 in a saloon brawl, leaving his wife a widow.

Margaret McDowell was left with five children, a house and a garden. She had taken in boarders as a means of income, but found she needed to do something else to remain financially able. In August 1849 she hired a surveyor to map 160 acres (0.65 km^{2}) that was adjoined to her garden. In October of that year she established the boundaries of her property and created a town plat of 41 blocks which she named Washington. She sold several lots during the next few years, but Washington's plat was not officially recorded and the town was called by other names including "Margeretta" and "West Sacramento".

In 1850 there were approximately 300 people residing in Washington. During the summer of 1851 the county seat was relocated from Fremont to Washington because of the severe flooding that Fremont had experienced the winter before. It now seemed that Washington had the potential to become comparable to its "booming" sister city, Sacramento on the opposite side of the river.

A post office was established in April 1854 but the building burnt down in 1856 and to the dismay of the residents, a post office was never reconstructed and they had to go to Sacramento to get their mail for the next 33 years.

The Washington Unified School District was organized in 1856, and the land was donated by Margaret McDowell, now married to Dr. Enos C. Taylor, her third husband, and renamed Mrs. Margaret Taylor. The school district still serves West Sacramento, and built three local schools within the first decade of its existence.

Local flooding that had occurred almost annually had alarmed Yolo County residents who voted to move the county seat to Cacheville (now Yolo) in 1857. However, residents disliked their choice because Cacheville was so isolated and small, and moved the county seat back to Washington. Unfortunately the weather proved disastrous in the winter of 1861–62, and in 1862 the voters held a special election to vote a permanent county seat. The county seat was elected to be Woodland to the dislike of Washingtonians. Another heavy blow to the already downtrodden Washington residents was the completion of a bridge to Sacramento located roughly where the I Street Bridge is located today. Travelers coming from the Bay Area now had no reason to stop in Washington on their way to Sacramento. There was no need to use the local ferries because the toll bridge was cheaper.

Economic optimism increased in Washington when the California Pacific Railroad reached the town in November 1868, and Washington was the railhead of the line that started in Vallejo. The outcome wasn't quite as hoped for. Property values did not increase, and had actually decreased in comparison to the Gold Rush days. In addition to that, a new junction was completed in Davisville (now Davis) that headed towards Woodland, diverting rail traffic from Washington. Furthermore, in 1870 Cal-P reconstructed the I Street Bridge to withstand the weight of rail cars, so the rail line could reach Sacramento.

In 1871 what is modern day Downtown Sacramento raised its buildings nine feet and reinforced the levees on its side of the Sacramento River to withstand the annual flooding. The unincorporated town of Washington could not afford to properly engineer well-protected levees nor raise the whole town, so each year they would fix their levees and endure any flooding that would occur.

The town was renamed in the late 1800s in honor of the anti-slavery advocate and United States Senator David C. Broderick.

A new post office was established in 1893, and operated until 1909 with a brief closure in 1895 to 1896.

== Businesses ==
The largest employer in Broderick is the California State Teachers Retirement System, which built its headquarters on the waterfront. The Ziggurat building, originally built as the corporate headquarters for The Money Store and now home to the State Department of General Services, sits at the edge of the area.

The neighborhood's iconic restaurant is Sal's Tacos, known for its mosaic tile decor. In 2012, Broderick Restaurant and Bar opened.

== Notable people ==
- Harold "Bizz" Johnson - Congressman 1959-1981
