= Nihon Shokken =

Japanese food company

Nihon Shokken Holdings Co., Ltd.
- Native name: 日本食研ホールディングス株式会社
- Romanized name: Nihon Shokken Ho-rudinguzu Kabushikigaisha
- Company type: Private
- Industry: Food manufacturing
- Founded: October 1, 1971
- Founder: Kazuhiko Ozawa
- Headquarters: 3, 1-chome Tomitashinko, Imabari City, Ehime Prefecture, Japan
- Number of locations: 304 locations (2017)
- Key people: Tetsuya Ozawa (President); Kazuhiko Ozawa (CEO)
- Number of employees: 4,138 (2016)
- Subsidiaries: Nippon Shokken
- Website: www.nihonshokken.co.jp

Nihon Shokken Co., Ltd. is a large food company in Japan, best known for producing Japanese sauces and seasonings. The company's U.S. factory and headquarters are located in West Sacramento, California. It is one of Japan's most successful food companies and is the largest sauce manufacturer/distributor in Japan.

== History ==
The company was originally founded in 1971. In 1973 it established the Institute of Livestock Processing Co., Ltd. The company changed its name in 1975, then becoming Nihon Shokken Co., Ltd. In 1989 it started "BANSANKAN". 2006 saw the company engage with overseas suppliers, including distributing spring water from Canada, to the Asian market In 2008, the company was involved in a nationwide toxic food scare in Japan involving imported Chinese frozen food. Nihon Shokken along with other national food brands declared a recall after hundreds of Japanese received food poisoning from contaminated products. Also in 2008, the company embarked on a major promotional effort via the Tryvertising store concept, where after paying an annual fee, food items were available for free to anyone entering the concept store. The company expanded its production facilities to the US, with a food processing plant being established in West Sacramento, in 2012. Management philosophy is " Success in business brings people great happiness."

== Group ==
- Nihon Shokken Holdings Co., LTD.
- Nihon Shokken Co., LTD.
- Nihon Shokken Food-Tech Co., LTD.
- Nippon Shokken USA Inc.
- Suzhou Shokken Co., LTD.
- Shokken Foods China Co., LTD.
- Keio Jimusho Co., LTD.
- Nihon Shokken Fudousan Co. LTD.
- Nihon Shokken Asset Co. LTD.
- Keio Sangyo Co., LTD
- Keio Hotel Co., LTD
- Keio Home Co., LTD
- Keio Up Co., LTD
- Nihon Shokken Smile Partners Co., LTD
