= Bashas' =

Arizona based grocery store chain

Bashas' Inc.

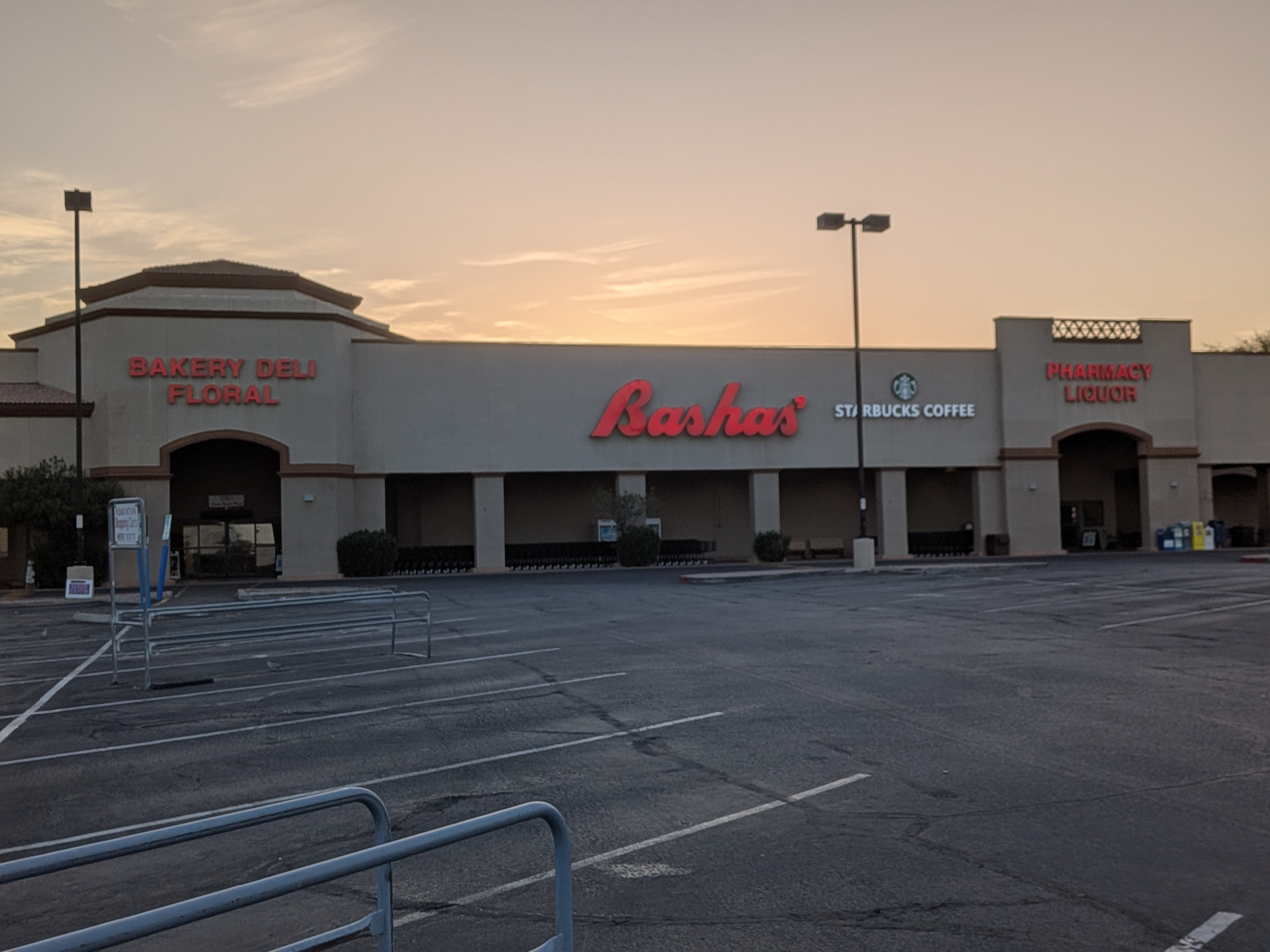
- A Bashas' Supermarket in Gold Canyon, Arizona
- Type: Subsidiary
- Industry: Retail
- Founded: 1932; 94 years ago in Goodyear, Arizona, U.S.
- Founders: Ike Basha; Eddie Basha, Sr.
- Headquarters: Chandler, Arizona, U.S.
- Number of locations: Over 100
- Area served: Arizona; New Mexico
- Products: Grocery
- Owner: Basha family (1932–2021); Raley family via Raley's Supermarkets (2021–present)
- Number of employees: approximately 9000
- Website: www.bashas.com

Bashas' is a grocery store chain, primarily located in Arizona, with two locations outside the state in Crownpoint, New Mexico, and Shiprock, New Mexico. Its headquarters are in Chandler. Since December 2021, Bashas' has operated as part of The Raley's Companies, which acquired the Bashas' Company that year.

== History ==
Najeeb Basha immigrated to the United States from Lebanon in 1886; he and his wife Najeeby moved to Arizona in 1910, two years before Arizona statehood. The family struggled for years in retail sales in the Arizona mining towns of Ray and Sonora, facing numerous setbacks, but remained determined to succeed. The first store to officially incorporate the Bashas' name opened in 1932 in Goodyear, Arizona, as a company store. Employees of J. G. Boswell could purchase groceries with company scrip. Bashas' was founded by Najeeb and Najeeby's sons, Ike Basha and Eddie Basha, Sr.

Bashas' acquired Megafoods stores in Arizona in 1996.

On July 12, 2009, Bashas' filed for bankruptcy protection under Chapter 11, citing the weak economy, increased competition, and their ongoing legal fight with the UFCW union.

Bashas' filed for Chapter 11 bankruptcy protection in July 2009. The company closed ten Bashas' and Food City locations before emerging from bankruptcy in late 2010. Its reorganization plan called for repaying its creditors in full.

Upon the death of Eddie Sr., leadership was taken over by Eddie Basha, Jr. Eddie Jr. died in March 2013, and was succeeded by Edward Basha III. In June 2023, Steve Mayer succeeded Edward “Trey” Basha III as president.

In March 2014 Bashas' named Edward Basha III, president, CEO and chairman of the board. Darl Andersen, who had been president and CEO, will assume the role of executive adviser to the president and chairman. Edward Basha III was formerly vice president, retail operations. Robert Ortiz will assume the role of senior vice president, operations. Ortiz was previously vice president, sales and marketing, and will be succeeded by Jim Vaughan with the title of senior vice president, procurement and marketing. He had been president of the Super Saver group of stores. In addition, Don Ulrich was named executive chief operating officer.

In March 2017, Bashas' partnered with Instacart.

During the 2020 pandemic, Bashas’ Corporation found itself struggling to compete with larger national grocery chains that had better access to products, leaving the company with three options: buy, merge, or sell. On December 15, 2021, Bashas' merged with California-based Raley's Supermarkets. The deal brought Bashas’, AJ’s Fine Foods, and Food City under the Raley’s Family of Fine Stores while allowing all brands and Bashas’ Chandler-based corporate office to remain in place under existing Bashas family leadership. Raley’s has committed to reinvesting in the Arizona stores, expanding into new markets, upgrading technology, and increasing employee wages.

== Overview ==
The Bashas' family of stores includes four distinct formats: Bashas', Bashas' Diné, AJ's Fine Foods, and Food City. The company has more than 100 stores serving every county in Arizona and Crownpoint, New Mexico. The company had a location in Needles, California, which closed in May 2014.

Bashas' doubled in size in the early 21st century with stores under the Bashas' name, as well as AJ's Fine Foods, and Food City, bringing the total to more than 130 stores.

After changes in 2009, Bashas' employs approximately 8,500 people. Most Bashas' stores are non-union. Nine stores that Bashas' acquired from previous chains continue to be represented by the United Food and Commercial Workers, which campaigns against the chain. In October 2007, an Administrative Law Judge sided with the UFCW and an NLRB ruling that Bashas' violated federal law by withdrawing recognition to the UFCW at the inherited stores.

Bashas' has a Distribution Center, located in Chandler, which includes over 16 acres (65,000 m^{2}) of under-roof space, as well as a full mechanic shop. The perishables area of the center is temperature- and climate-controlled. It includes ripening rooms and areas that vary in temperature from a base temperature of 55 °F year-round to freezer rooms of −10 °F.

== Store nameplates ==
=== Bashas' ===
Bashas' Supermarkets are traditional grocery stores. The company competes primarily against Kroger-owned, Arizona-based Fry's Food and Drug, along with Albertsons and Safeway locations in Arizona.

Bashas' Diné Markets are located on the Navajo Nation. They specialize in the needs of Navajo customers, with products such as Blue Bird flour for fry bread, mutton, and wool. Stores are labeled in both Navajo and English.

Slogans: "Where You've Got a Friend"; "From Our Family to Yours Since 1932"; "Sensational Savings... and Service too!"

=== AJ's Fine Foods ===
AJ's Fine Foods are gourmet and specialty stores. The stores feature chef-prepared entrees, an extensive wine collection with trained cellar staff, and specialty baked goods. These are the few former Bayless Markets left.

Slogans: "Experience the Difference"; "The Purveyors of Fine Foods".

=== Food City ===
Food City was acquired by Bashas' in 1993. Since acquiring the original Food City store, numerous Bashas' stores (including many of the oldest locations dating from the 1950s and '60s) have been converted to this format. Food City acquired the Southwest Supermarkets stores in 2001. Food City offers a full variety of ethnic and Hispanic food choices. Some of these stores were also previously Bayless Markets. Food City competes in its home market of Arizona against El Rancho Market and "Fry's Mercado" launched by Kroger-owned Fry's Food and Drug.

The Food City stores outside of Arizona are unrelated.
