= West Sacramento, California =

City in California, United States

- City
- City of West Sacramento
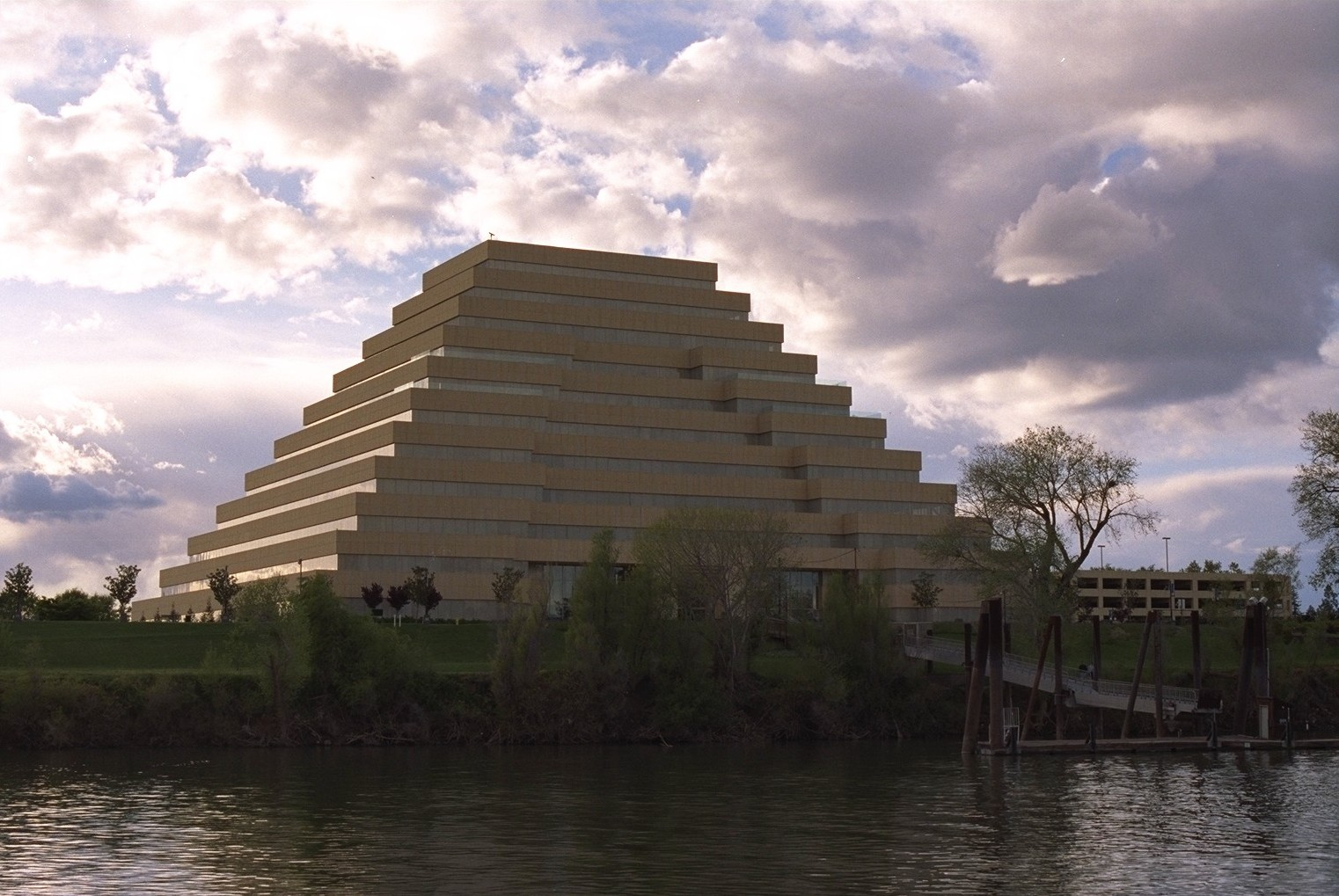
- The Ziggurat Building on the Sacramento River in West Sacramento

- Seal
- Nickname: West Sac
- Interactive map of West Sacramento, California
- Location in the State of California Location in the contiguous United States
- Coordinates: 38°34′50″N 121°31′49″W
- Country: United States
- State: California
- County: Yolo
- Incorporated: January 1, 1987

Government
  - Type: Council–Manager
  - Mayor: Martha Guerrero
  - City Council: Members: Mayor: Martha Guerrero; D1: Norma Alcala; D2: Quirina Orozco; D3: Dawnté Early; D4: Sulpizio Hull
  - City manager: Aaron Laurel
  - State leg.: Sen. Christopher Cabaldon (D); Asm. Cecilia Aguiar-Curry (D)
  - U.S. Congress: Doris Matsui (D)

Area
  - Total: 22.80 sq mi (59.05 km^{2})
  - Land: 21.47 sq mi (55.61 km^{2})
  - Water: 1.33 sq mi (3.45 km^{2}) 5.84%
- Elevation: 20 ft (6 m)

Population (2020)
  - Total: 53,915
  - Estimate (2024): 55,991
  - Density: 2,511/sq mi (969.5/km^{2})
- Time zone: UTC-8 (Pacific)
  - Summer (DST): UTC-7 (PDT)
- ZIP code: 95691, 95605
- Area codes: 916 and 279
- FIPS code: 06-84816
- GNIS feature IDs: 1660149, 2412228
- Website: cityofwestsacramento.org

West Sacramento (also known as West Sac) is a city in Yolo County, California, United States. The city is separated from Sacramento by the Sacramento River, which also separates Sacramento and Yolo counties. The population was 53,915 at the 2020 census, up from 48,744 at the 2010 census. The traditional industrial center of the region since the California gold rush era, West Sacramento is home to a diverse economy and is one of the area's top four employment centers.

The United States Conference of Mayors named West Sacramento as the Most Livable City in America in 2014 in the category of cities with fewer than 100,000 residents.

West Sacramento is part of the Sacramento–Arden Arcade–Roseville Metropolitan Statistical Area which has a population (2000) of approximately 1,796,857 (July 1, 2016, estimate placed the population at 2,296,418). Major industries to the region include agriculture, government, and transportation.

== History ==
=== Gold Rush era ===
In 1844, John Schwartz, a Flemish traveler, was the first Euro-American to permanently settle in the area of West Sacramento, which at that time was part of Mexico. He built a shack on the west bank of the Sacramento River six miles (9.7 km) south of its connection with the American River. John, with the help of his brother George, founded a salmon fishery along the river. In addition to the fishery, they also found the soil to be fertile and began farming and raising livestock. The announcement of the discovery of gold at Sutter's Mill in 1848 brought a multitude of miners to the region. This also coincided with the end of the Mexican–American War.

In 1846, a man named James McDowell bought 600 acres (240 ha) from John Schwartz. With his wife, Margaret, and their three daughters, McDowell settled in the area we know today as Broderick. The McDowell family experienced first-hand the violence that the gold rush era brought with it. In May 1849, James McDowell was shot and killed in a barroom argument that he had supposedly started. With the loss of the sole supporter of the McDowell family, Margaret needed to find a way to provide for her family.

In October 1849, Margaret hired a land surveyor to map out 160 acres (65 ha), which was then divided into forty one blocks. She sold individual lots within this platted area which she named the "Town of Washington". The first lot was sold to August W. Kaye for $500. During its first ten years, the rural Town of Washington went through a significant increase in business development and shipping activity. One of the first businesses to be established in the town was the California Steam Navigation Company, which was attracted to the area in 1859 by how close the Sacramento River is to it. Other businesses in early Washington included hotels, saloons, and restaurants catering to the needs of people passing through. Many of the travelers making the treacherous journey through the marshlands on their way to Sacramento were appreciative of the rest stop at the Town of Washington.

While Sacramento began to urbanize on the other side of the river, early West Sacramento found its hand at agricultural development. Salmon, sturgeon, catfish, eel, crayfish, and clams proved to be lucrative in this region as fisherman soon found. The river settlement was flourishing, stocking fish markets not only in Sacramento, but in San Francisco as well. In addition, the rich soil of the valley produced abundant crops of corn, melons, cucumbers, and sweet potatoes. The dairy industry also established roots in West Sacramento around this time.

One of the area's most well known dairy farmers was Mike Bryte. Bryte came to California in 1849 to try his hand at gold mining. He didn't make a fortune in gold, but was able to purchase a dairy farm with his findings. When the California Steam Navigation Company came to Washington, Bryte used the steamships to carry his dairy products to various markets within the region. Profits from this allowed Bryte to expand his holdings. Bryte was able to own several thousand acres of land in the area to farm on, as well as raise his many livestock on. Mike Bryte's influence in the community was marked by his election to the Yolo County Board of Supervisors and later as sheriff. During the 20th century, Mike Bryte's property was divided and became known as the community of Bryte.

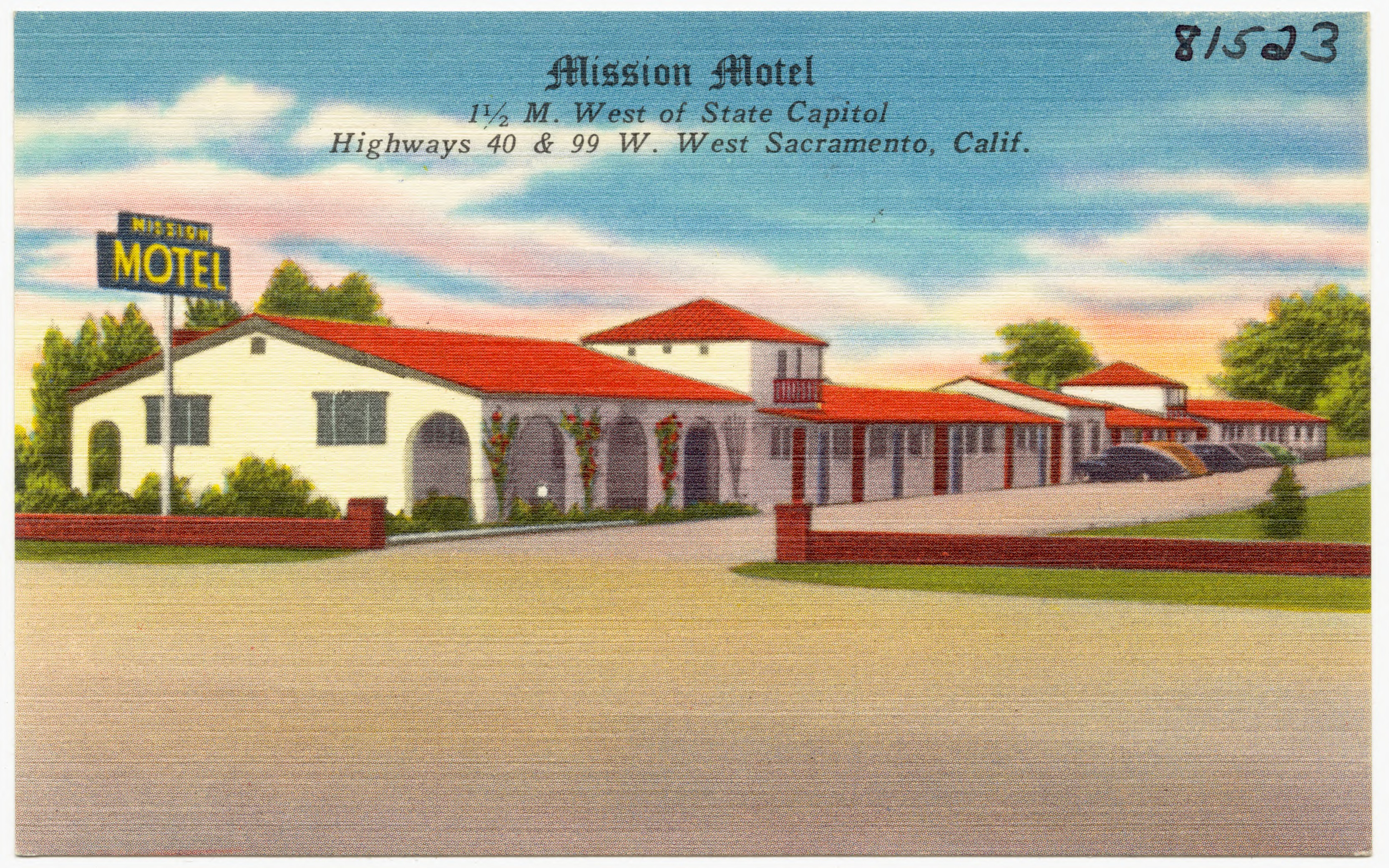
Mission Motel on Route 99 in West Sacramento (c.1930s).

=== Developing a city ===
In time, the region began to develop. The Town of Washington was renamed Broderick in honor of U. S. Senator David C. Broderick. After 1900, the three communities known as Bryte, Broderick, and West Sacramento were cumulatively known as "East Yolo".

From 1900 to 1920, the population of this area doubled from 1,398 to 2,638. The West Sacramento post office opened in 1915.

These communities officially incorporated as the City of West Sacramento in 1987.

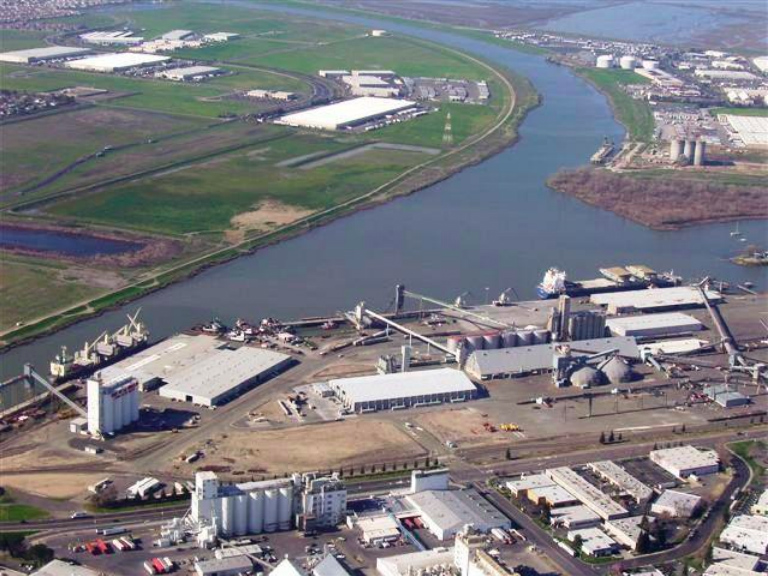
Port of West Sacramento, located in the city.

=== Port of West Sacramento ===
In June 1963, the Port of Sacramento was opened to deep sea traffic with the completion of the Sacramento Deep Water Ship Channel. The project had been authorized by Congress in 1946 and construction commenced in 1949 on the west side of the river. It has since been renamed The Port of West Sacramento. The Port's main imports include cement and exports include rice.

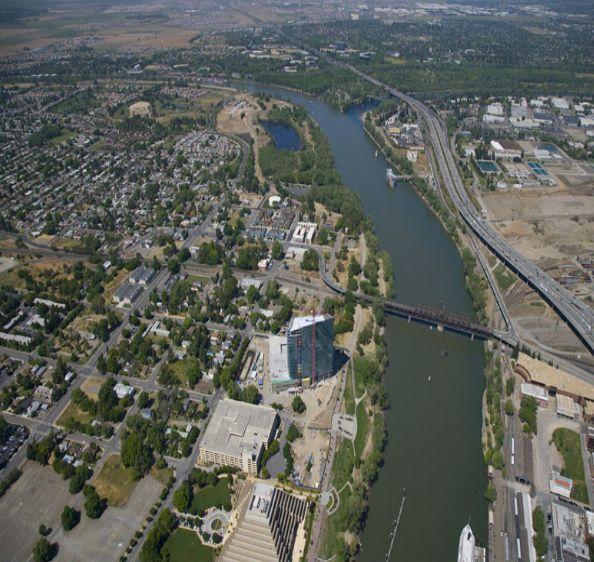
Aerial view of West Sacramento and Sacramento River.

== Geography ==
West Sacramento is located at 38°34′50″N 121°31′49″W.

According to the United States Census Bureau, the city has a total area of 22.8 square miles (59 km^{2}), of which 21.5 square miles (56 km^{2}) is land and 1.3 square miles (3.4 km^{2}) (5.84%) is water.

=== Neighborhoods ===
West Sacramento, which lies in Yolo County, is separated from the city of Sacramento and Sacramento County by the Sacramento River. West Sacramento, incorporated in 1987, consists of three communities that were originally distinct towns, Broderick, Bryte, and West Sacramento (originally just the community north of the port canal and south of the railroads), as well as the Southport area.

Southport, which comprises about half of the city's land area, originally consisted of rural homesteads and small neighborhoods in Arlington Oaks and Linden, but now has a considerable population that resulted from housing booms in the early 1990s and the early 2000s, adding new neighborhoods in Bridgeway, Gateway, River Ranch, and Newport.

=== Climate ===
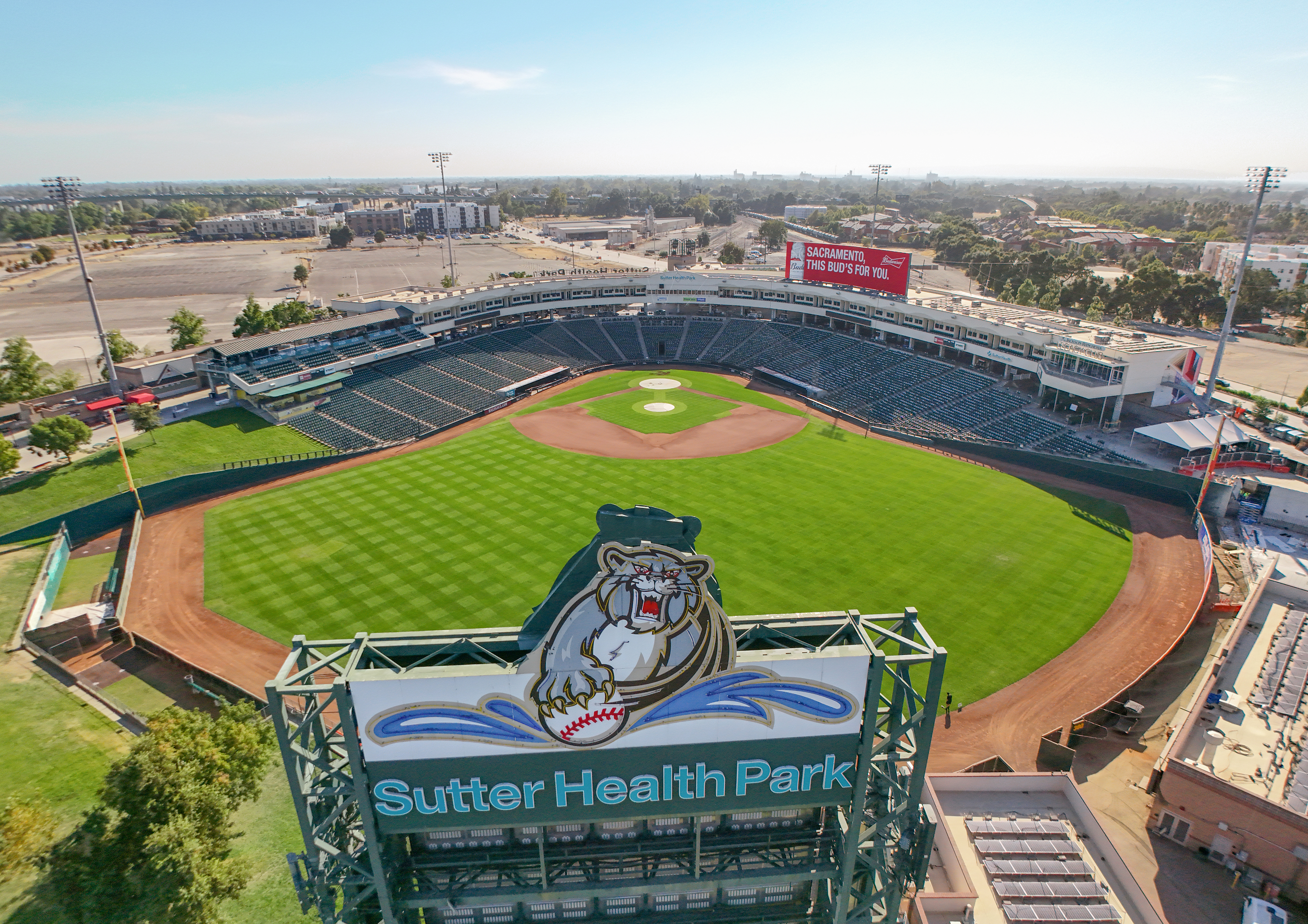
Sutter Health Park

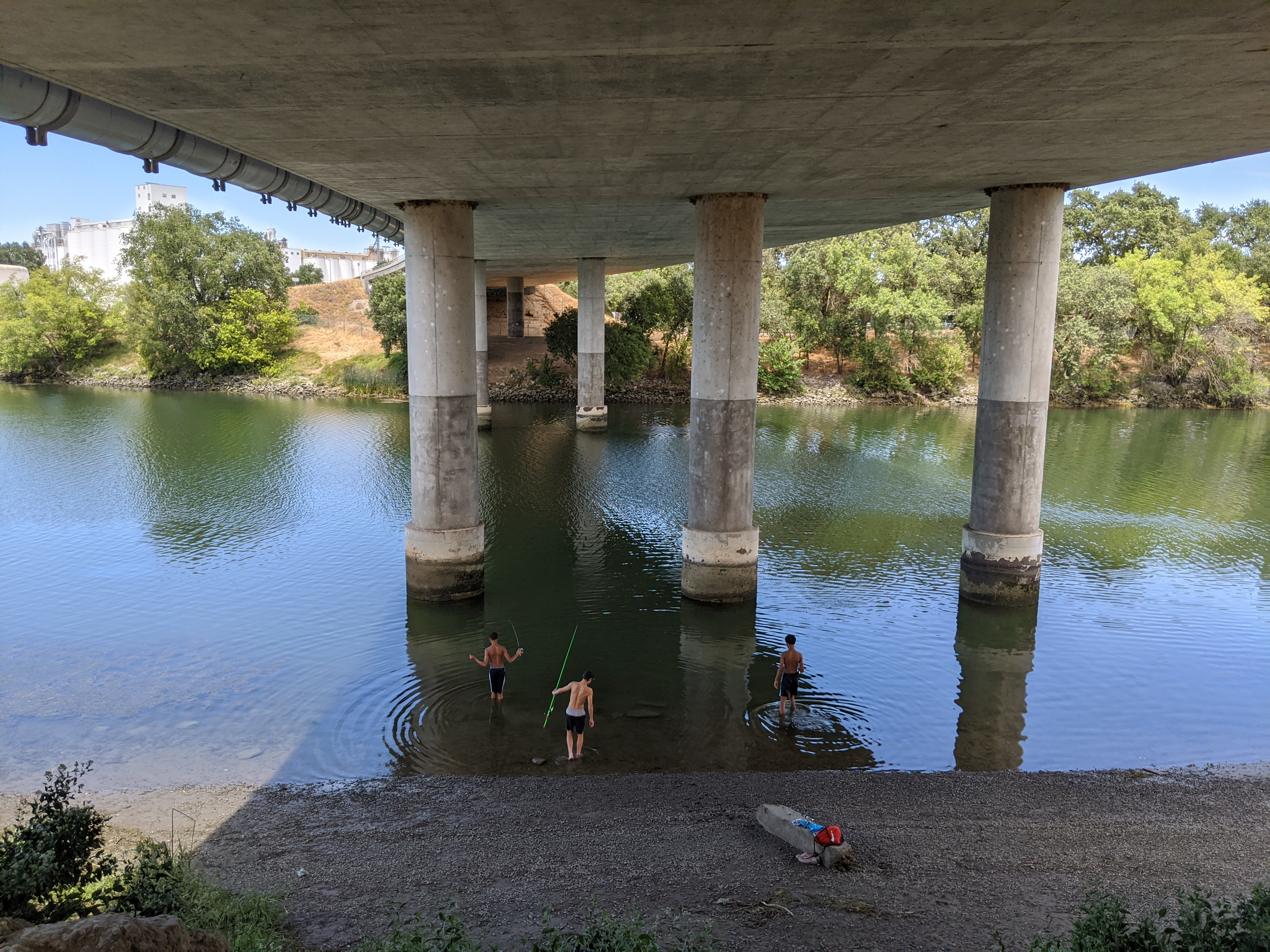
Locals enjoy fishing in the Sacramento Deep Water Ship Channel under the Daniel C. Palamidessi Bridge (Industrial Blvd.)

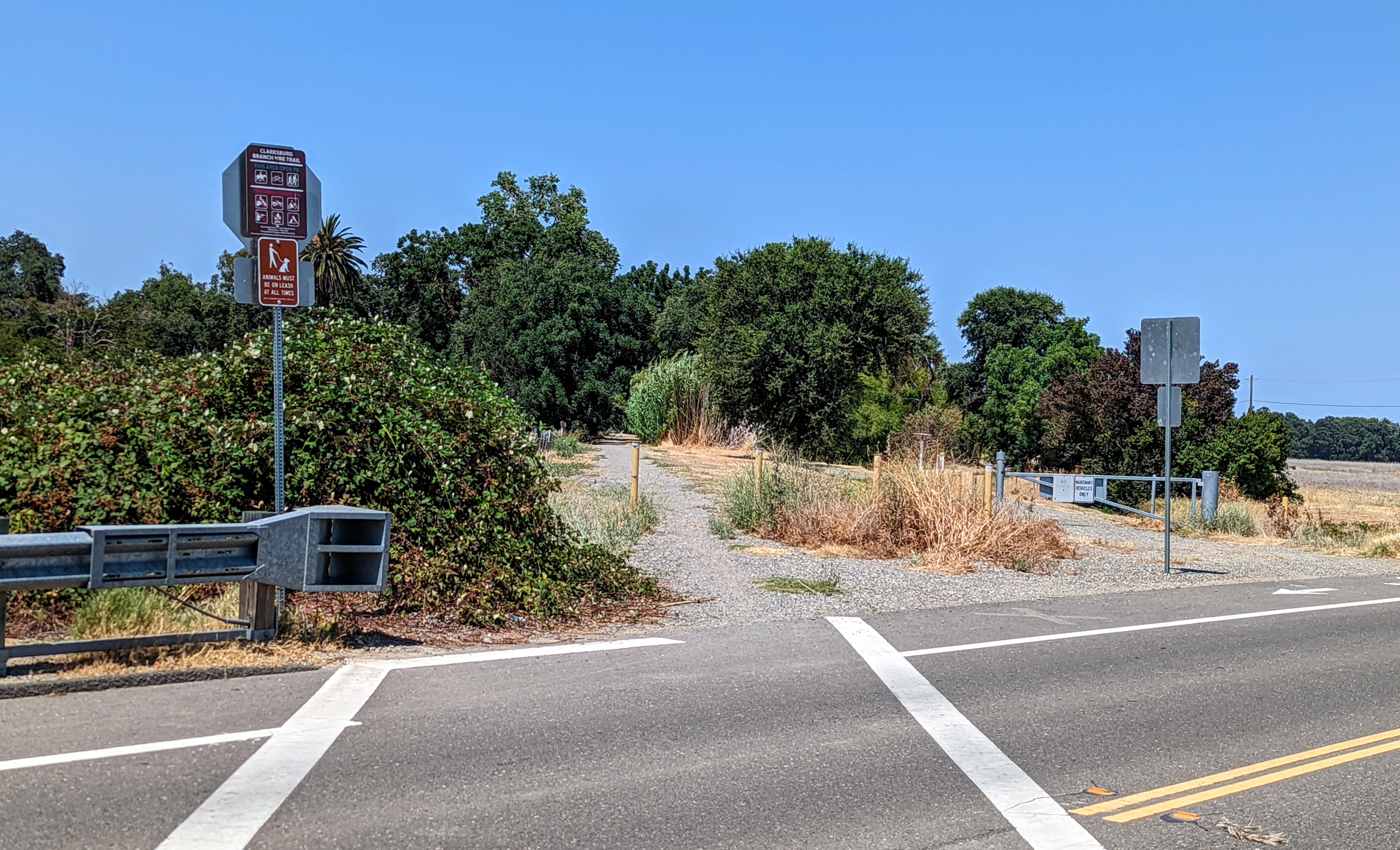
The Clarksburg Branch Line Trail follows an old railway branch in West Sac.

According to the Köppen Climate Classification system, West Sacramento has a hot-summer Mediterranean climate, abbreviated "Csa" on climate maps.

Climate data for West Sacramento, California
Month	Jan	Feb	Mar	Apr	May	Jun	Jul	Aug	Sep	Oct	Nov	Dec	Year
Record high °F (°C)	74 (23)	79 (26)	86 (30)	95 (35)	108 (42)	113 (45)	112 (44)	110 (43)	111 (44)	101 (38)	86 (30)	78 (26)	113 (45)
Mean daily maximum °F (°C)	54 (12)	61 (16)	66 (19)	73 (23)	81 (27)	88 (31)	93 (34)	92 (33)	88 (31)	79 (26)	64 (18)	55 (13)	74 (23)
Mean daily minimum °F (°C)	40 (4)	43 (6)	45 (7)	48 (9)	52 (11)	57 (14)	59 (15)	59 (15)	57 (14)	51 (11)	44 (7)	39 (4)	49 (9)
Record low °F (°C)	19 (−7)	21 (−6)	24 (−4)	30 (−1)	34 (1)	37 (3)	43 (6)	40 (4)	37 (3)	27 (−3)	24 (−4)	20 (−7)	19 (−7)
Average precipitation inches (mm)	4.06 (103)	3.66 (93)	2.98 (76)	1.08 (27)	0.55 (14)	0.18 (4.6)	0.05 (1.3)	0.06 (1.5)	0.35 (8.9)	0.96 (24)	2.38 (60)	2.66 (68)	18.97 (482)

== Businesses ==
=== TV stations ===
West Sacramento is home to Sacramento-area CBS television station KOVR (channel 13) and independent station KMAX-TV (channel 31). Both stations, owned and operated by CBS, are housed on KOVR Drive.

=== Newspapers ===
The News-Ledger and the West Sacramento Sun are weekly, printed newspapers that serve West Sacramento. The Sacramento Bee has the largest circulation and readership in the city.

=== Sports ===
Sutter Health Park is the home of Sacramento River Cats, and is also the temporary home of the Athletics of Major League Baseball before they relocate to Las Vegas, Nevada. It was the home of the former Sacramento Mountain Lions in the defunct United Football League.

West Sacramento is also the home city for the Sacramento Gold team of the National Premier Soccer League.

=== California Highway Patrol ===
West Sacramento is the home of the California Highway Patrol Academy, and the CHP Museum is housed on the same grounds.

In 2007–2008 there were efforts to move the California Highway Patrol official headquarters from Sacramento (in Sacramento County) to West Sacramento (in Yolo County), but these were ultimately unsuccessful.

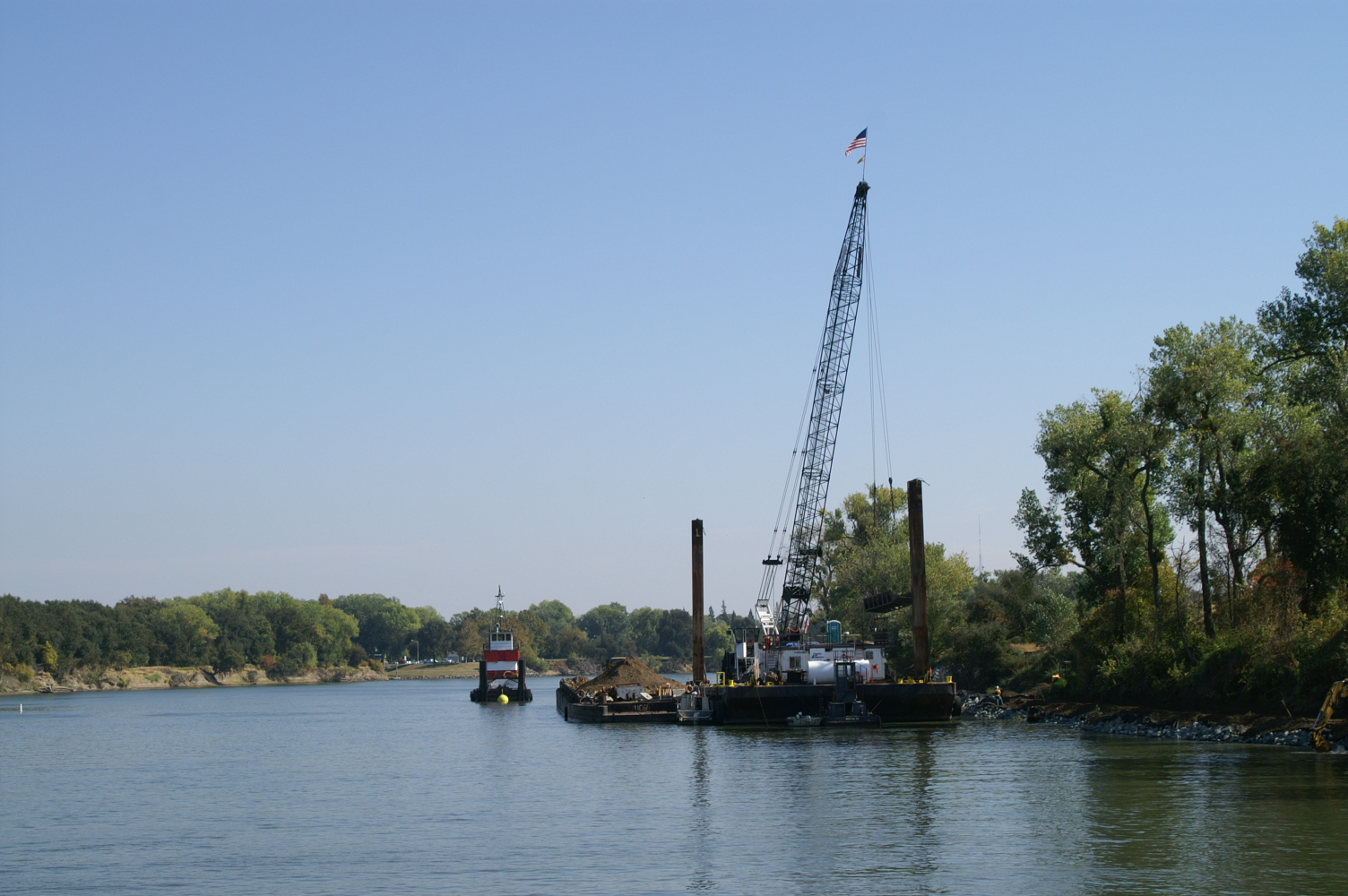
Sacramento River bank stabilization project in the city (2006).

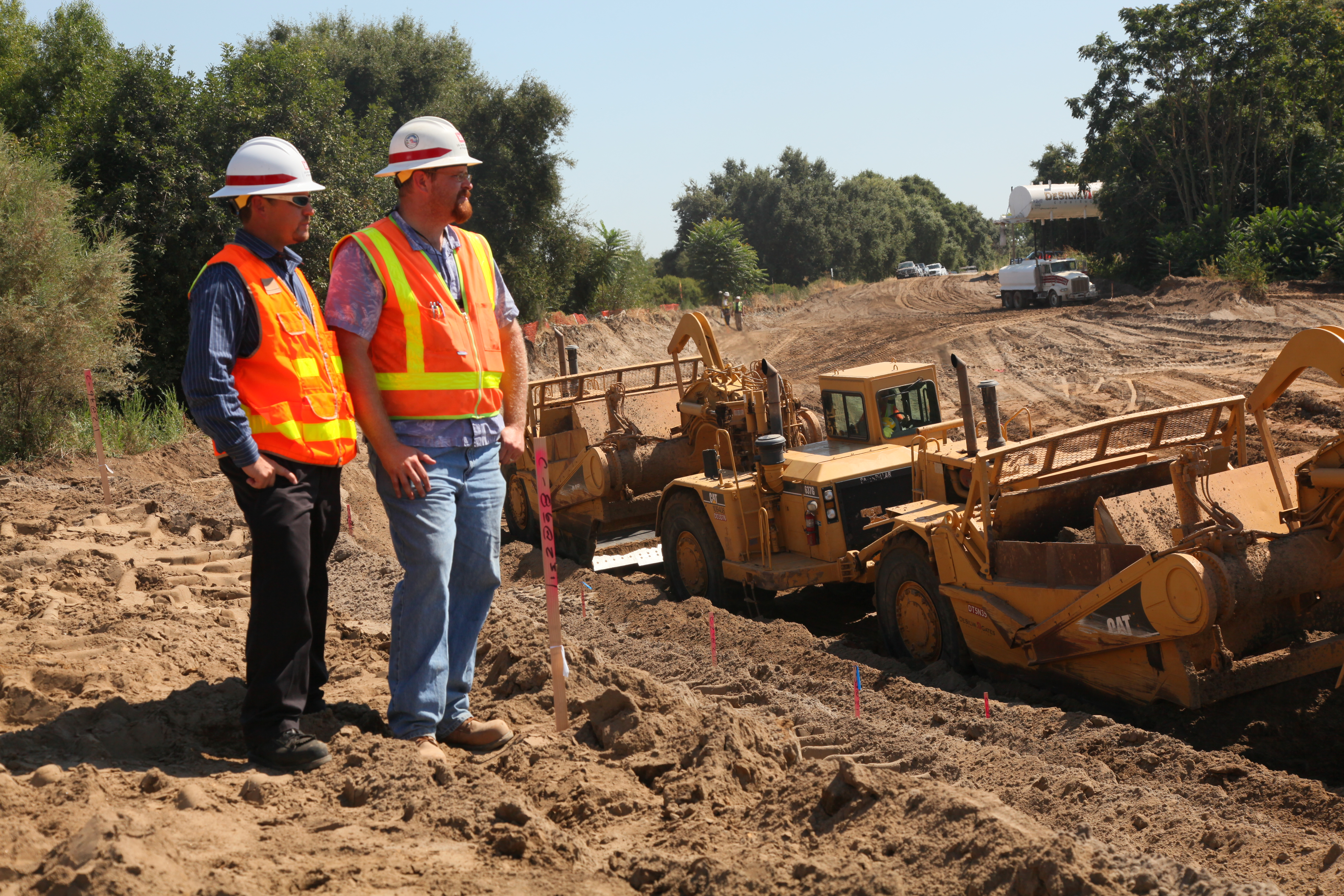
U.S. Army Corps of Engineers and the Central Valley Flood Protection Board joint effort to upgrade Sacramento River levees in West Sacramento (2011).

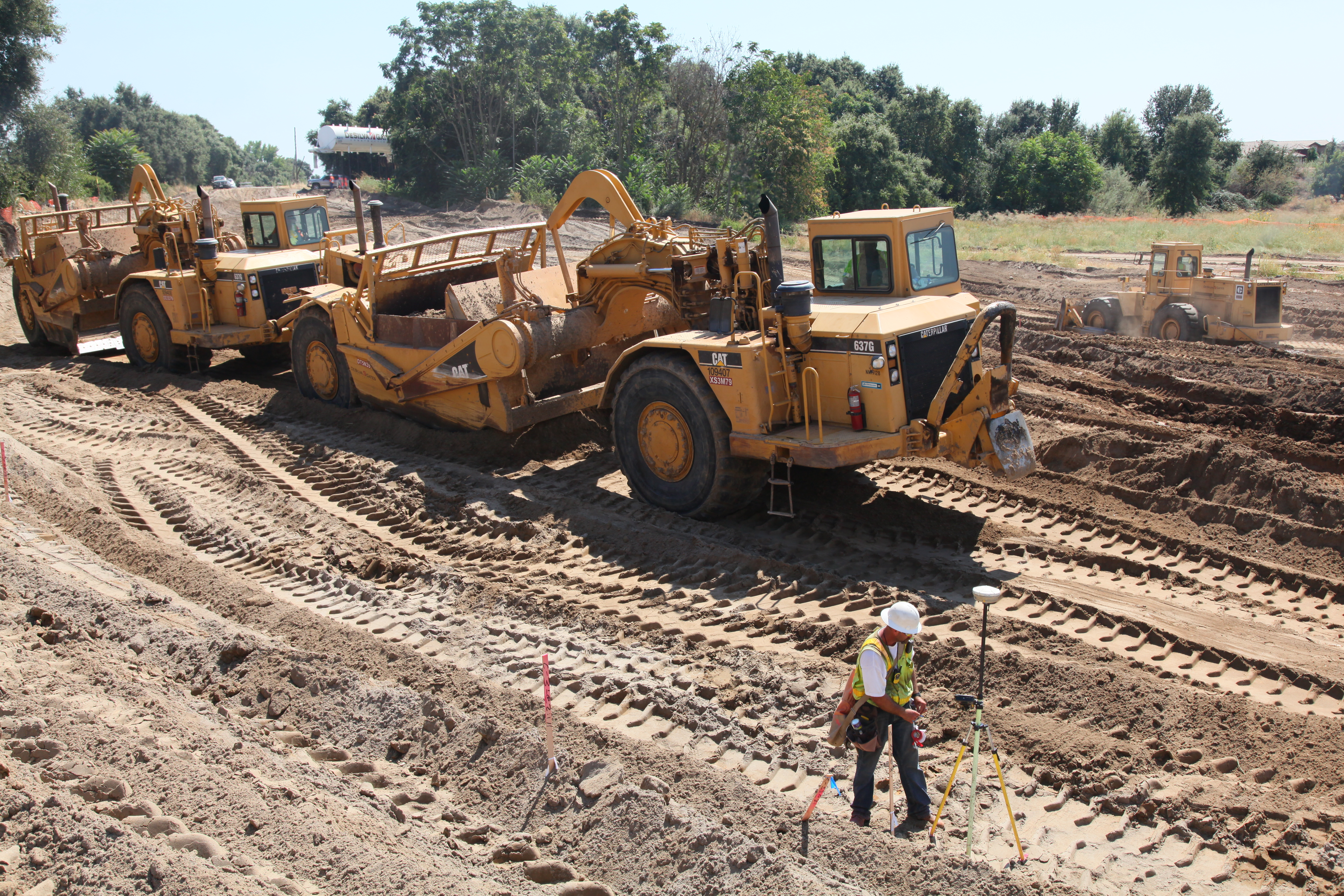
Crews construct the new setback levee along South River Road in West Sacramento (2011).

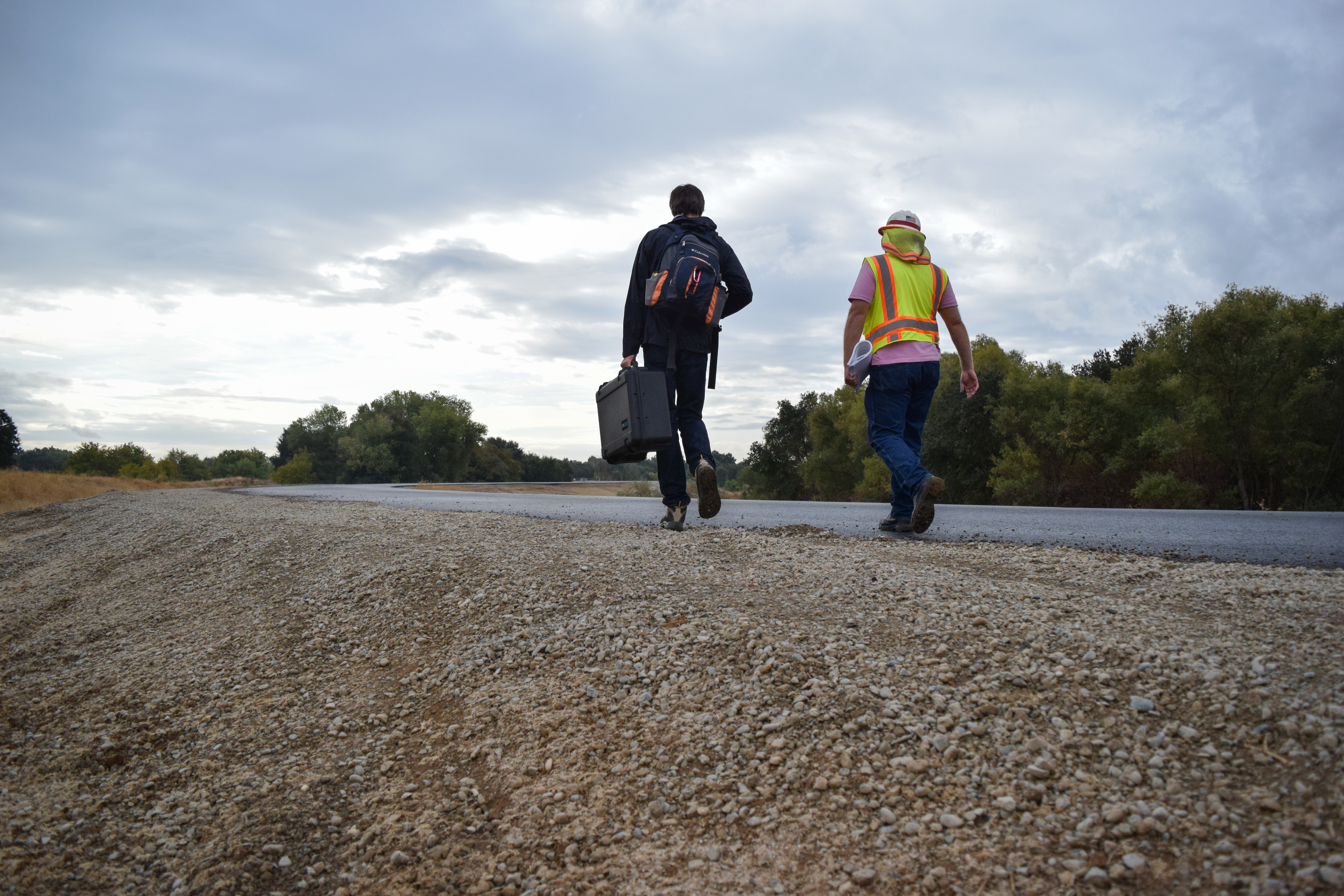
Corps completes new paved setback levee in West Sacramento (2014).

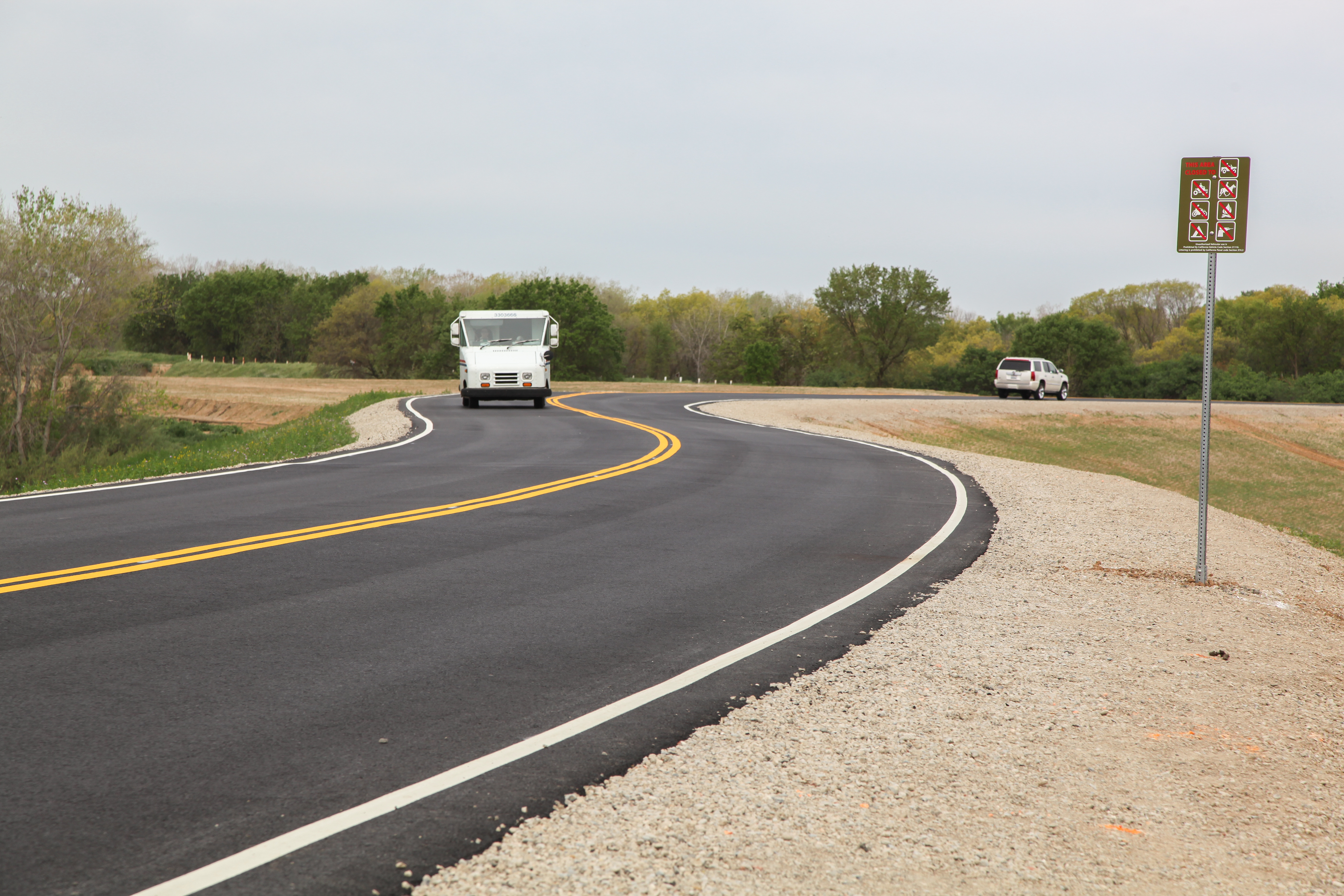
Completed setback levee, now functioning as South River Road in West Sacramento (2015).

=== Education ===
==== Washington Unified School District ====
Public schools and programs operated by the Washington Unified School District currently include:

Elementary schools

- Bridgeway Island
- Elkhorn
- Riverbank
- Southport
- Stonegate
- Westfield
- Westmore Oaks

High schools

- River City High School

Alternative programs

- Independent Study
- Preschool programs
- Washington Adult School
- Yolo Education Center
- Bryte Career and College Training

Charter schools

- Washington Middle College High School

==== Independent / private schools ====
- Sacramento Valley Charter School
- Heritage Peak Charter School
- Our Lady of Grace, WestSac
- Lighthouse Charter School

==== Colleges ====
- Sacramento City College, WestSac Center

In 2017, West Sacramento launched the West Sacramento Home Run, an education initiative offering universal preschool, college savings accounts for preschool graduates enrolled in the Washington Unified School District, internship opportunities with local businesses/organizations and free first year of college tuition for all West Sacramento high school graduates.

=== Other businesses ===
Raley's, a major grocery store chain in Northern and Central California, has its corporate headquarters in West Sacramento.

The California State Teachers Retirement System pension fund CalSTRS is based in West Sacramento and its headquarters tower on the riverfront is the city's tallest building.

In 2011, mayor Christopher Cabaldon launched an initiative to develop the city as a global food hub and center of food innovation, and several major international companies in the sector made West Sacramento their US or North American headquarters and manufacturing/research centers, including Nippon Shokken, Shinmei Foods, TOMRA, and Bayer Crop Science.

=== Top employers ===
According to the city's 2025 "Comprehensive Annual Financial Report," the top employers in the city are:

#	Employer	# of Employees
1	Department of General Services	3,000
2	CalSTRS	1,401
3	Washington Unified School District	766
4	Tony's Fine Foods	620
5	United Postal Service	580
6	Blazona Construction	400
6	City of West Sacramento	400
8	Walmart	397
9	Raley's / Bel Air Markets Headquarters	360
10	IKEA	313
11	Beckman Coulter	300
11	Capital Express Lines	300
11	Clark Pacific	300
11	FedEx	300
11	McGuire & Hester	300
16	KOVR	240
17	Broadbase Inc.	220
18	CA Department of Technology	200
18	Farmer's Rice	200
20	IDEXX Laboratories	175
20	Brown Construction	175
22	Lowe's Home Improvement	175
23	Target Store #2268	167
24	Golden Brands	150
24	Holt of California	150

== Demographics ==
Historical population
Census	Pop.	Note	%±
1970	12,002		—
1980	10,875		−9.4%
1990	28,898		165.7%
2000	31,615		9.4%
2010	48,744		54.2%
2020	53,915		10.6%
2024 (est.)	55,991	▲	3.9%
U.S. Decennial Census

=== 2020 census ===
As of the 2020 census, West Sacramento had a population of 53,915 and a population density of 2,511.2 inhabitants per square mile (969.6/km^{2}).

The census reported that 99.7% of residents lived in urban areas and 0.3% lived in rural areas. It also reported that 99.5% of the population lived in households, 0.3% lived in non-institutionalized group quarters, and 0.2% were institutionalized.

The age distribution was 24.6% under the age of 18, 8.0% aged 18 to 24, 30.5% aged 25 to 44, 24.2% aged 45 to 64, and 12.7% who were 65 years of age or older. The median age was 36.6 years. For every 100 females, there were 95.6 males, and for every 100 females age 18 and over there were 93.6 males age 18 and over.

There were 19,550 households, of which 35.8% had children under the age of 18 living in them. Of all households, 45.0% were married-couple households, 8.6% were cohabiting couple households, 27.2% had a female householder with no spouse or partner present, and 19.2% had a male householder with no spouse or partner present. About 25.3% of all households were made up of individuals, and 8.9% had someone living alone who was 65 years of age or older. The average household size was 2.74. There were 12,912 families (66.0% of all households).

There were 20,245 housing units at an average density of 942.9 units per square mile (364.1 units/km^{2}), of which 19,550 (96.6%) were occupied and 3.4% were vacant. Of occupied units, 57.4% were owner-occupied and 42.6% were occupied by renters. The homeowner vacancy rate was 0.6% and the rental vacancy rate was 3.7%.

Racial composition as of the 2020 census
Race	Number	Percent
White	25,478	47.3%
Black or African American	2,673	5.0%
American Indian and Alaska Native	948	1.8%
Asian	7,352	13.6%
Native Hawaiian and Other Pacific Islander	624	1.2%
Some other race	7,880	14.6%
Two or more races	8,960	16.6%
Hispanic or Latino (of any race)	17,260	32.0%

=== Income and poverty ===
In 2023, the US Census Bureau estimated that the median household income was $90,791, and the per capita income was $41,653. About 9.9% of families and 13.4% of the population were below the poverty line.

=== 2010 census ===
The 2010 United States census reported that West Sacramento had a population of 48,744. The population density was 2,133.5 inhabitants per square mile (823.7/km^{2}). The racial makeup of West Sacramento was 29,521 (60.6%) White, 2,344 (4.8%) African American, 798 (1.6%) Native American, 5,106 (10.5%) Asian, 534 (1.1%) Pacific Islander, 6,709 (13.8%) from other races, and 3,732 (7.7%) from two or more races. Hispanic or Latino of any race were 15,282 persons (31.4%).

The Census reported that 48,406 people (99.3% of the population) lived in households, 246 (0.5%) lived in non-institutionalized group quarters, and 92 (0.2%) were institutionalized.

There were 17,421 households, out of which 6,626 (38.0%) had children under the age of 18 living in them, 8,073 (46.3%) were Heterosexual-sex married couples living together, 2,574 (14.8%) had a female householder with no husband present, 1,016 (5.8%) had a male householder with no wife present. There were 1,307 (7.5%) unmarried Heterosexual partnerships, and 186 (1.1%) Homosexual married couples or partnerships. 4,264 households (24.5%) were made up of individuals, and 1,314 (7.5%) had someone living alone who was 65 years of age or older. The average household size was 2.78. There were 11,663 families (66.9% of all households); the average family size was 3.37.

The population was spread out, with 13,036 people (26.7%) under the age of 18, 4,435 people (9.1%) aged 18 to 24, 15,129 people (31.0%) aged 25 to 44, 11,363 people (23.3%) aged 45 to 64, and 4,781 people (9.8%) who were 65 years of age or older. The median age was 33.6 years. For every 100 females, there were 97.7 males. For every 100 females age 18 and over, there were 95.0 males.

There were 18,681 housing units at an average density of 817.7 units per square mile (315.7 units/km^{2}), of which 10,234 (58.7%) were owner-occupied, and 7,187 (41.3%) were occupied by renters. The homeowner vacancy rate was 3.0%; the rental vacancy rate was 7.0%. 28,012 people (57.5% of the population) lived in owner-occupied housing units and 20,394 people (41.8%) lived in rental housing units.

== Transportation ==
=== Public transportation ===
==== Local and regional transit ====
West Sacramento, CA falls within the service area of several transportation providers that offer local and regional transit, as well as commuter rail services. The Yolo County Transportation District administers Yolobus, which operates local and intercity bus service 365 days a year in Yolo County and neighboring areas. Yolobus serves Davis, West Sacramento, Winters, Woodland, downtown Sacramento, Sacramento International Airport, Cache Creek Casino Resort, Esparto, Madison, Dunnigan, and Knights Landing. The Sacramento Regional Transit District (SacRT) provides fixed-route bus, light rail, paratransit, and dial-a-ride services throughout the City and County of Sacramento.

==== West Sacramento On-Demand ====
In May 2018, the City of West Sacramento partnered with Via Transportation to launch an on-demand microtransit service. The service, called West Sacramento On-Demand, offers trips anywhere in the city for a flat fare. As of April 2020, rides cost $1.75 for seniors and riders with disabilities and $3.50 for the general population. Companions can accompany riders for a "plus one" $1 fare, which encourages pooled trips. A $15 weekly pass ($7.50 for seniors and riders with disabilities) covers up to four rides per day. Passengers can request a ride by using a smartphone app or by calling a dispatcher.

== Notable people ==
- Christopher Cabaldon, longest serving mayor of West Sacramento, from 1998 to 2020
- Malcom Floyd, NFL wide receiver
- Eugene Garin, contemporary seascape artist
- Willie Jorrín, former World Boxing Council super bantamweight champion
- Burney Lamar, NASCAR driver
- Oleg Maskaev, former World Boxing Council heavyweight champion
- Steve Sax, former Los Angeles Dodgers second baseman
- Jamil Jan Kochai, author

== See also ==
- List of municipalities in California
