= AJ's Fine Foods =

American supermarket chain

- Formerly: AJ Bayless
- Industry: Retail; grocery
- Founded: 1930s
- Founder: Arthur Joseph Bayless
- Number of locations: 11
- Area served: Arizona, United States
- Parent: Raley's Supermarkets
- Website: ajsfinefoods.com

AJ's Fine Foods, formerly known as AJ Bayless, is an upscale supermarket chain headquartered in Phoenix, Arizona. It was founded by Arthur Joseph Bayless in 1930. His father, J. B. Bayless, had previously started a supermarket chain in Arizona in 1922, which he sold to MacMarr Stores in 1929.(Safeway acquired MacMarr in 1931.) There are currently 11 AJ's Fine Foods locations throughout Arizona.

== History ==
The company went through a bankruptcy in the late 1980s. It was acquired by Bashas'Corporation in 1993. Under Bashas' ownership, AJ's positioned itself as an upscale gourmet and specialty grocery chain with each store located in affluent neighborhoods. The stores featured chef-prepared entrees, an extensive wine collection with trained cellar staff, and specialty baked goods.

During the 2020 pandemic, Bashas’ Corporation found itself struggling to compete with larger national grocery chains that had better access to products, leaving the company with three options: buy, merge, or sell. In December 2021, Bashas' merged with California-based Raley's Supermarkets. The deal brought Bashas’, AJ’s Fine Foods, and Food City under the Raley’s Family of Fine Stores while allowing all brands and Bashas’ Chandler-based corporate office to remain in place under existing Bashas family leadership. Raley’s has committed to reinvesting in the Arizona stores, expanding into new markets, upgrading technology, and increasing employee wages.
