= Fremont Landing, California =

Former settlement on Sacramento River in California

Fremont Landing
- Former settlement
- Location in California Fremont Landing (the United States)
- Coordinates: 38°46′58″N 121°37′08″W
- Country: United States
- State: California
- County: Yolo
- Established: 1849
- Elevation: 26 ft (8 m)

Fremont Landing (also known as Fremont and Fremonts) was a former settlement in Yolo County, California, United States. It was located on the Sacramento River, 5.5 miles (8.9 km) east-southeast of Knights Landing, at an elevation of 26 feet (8 m).

== History ==
The area was settled by Jonas Spect on March 22, 1849, one half of a mile below the merging of the Feather River into the Sacramento River. Lt. George H. Derby wrote about the town on his report to the Secretary of War in 1849 and stated, "The Town of Vernon is situated at the junction of the Feather and Sacramento Rivers, and that of Fremont immediately opposite. Each contains some twenty houses and one or two hundred inhabitants."

Spect chose to settle at this site because of the potential business benefits of being upriver. Mexican law entitled people to a three league town if they would start a ferry service, which Spect then began. He hired John I. McCaughn to survey his three league town soon after he started his ferry business. The town was named after John C. Frémont, who had risen to public notoriety only three years beforehand. During the Municipal Election of October 1, 1849, there were around 300 voters in the area.

On April 5, 1850, the town received its first post office, the Fremont Post Office, and the title of county seat. Severe floods during the previous winters foreshadowed the fall of the city. These floods allowed for travel upriver and led to the founding of Marysville, closer to the mines. A legal battle for land rights between Spect and James Madison Harbin didn't help assuage fears of the townspeople. In 1851 the town of Fremonts Landing was disbanded; people moved out and took the town's buildings with them. Washington became the county seat on June 30, 1851. Very few citizens stayed in the area, with only three voters in the September 1855 general election. The post office was also closed, then opened again in the same year. The post office closed its doors permanently in November 1864. In 1870 the town had one house left.
