= Folsom Stage Line =

Transit System

Overview
- Area served: Folsom, CA
- Transit type: Bus Service
- Number of lines: 3

Operation
- Operator: SacRT

Folsom Stage Line is a 3 line transit system serving the City of Folsom, CA. Folsom Stage connects to many schools, shopping malls, as well as the SacRT Gold line light rail. Daily operations were taken over by SacRT on February 4, 2019, however service remained unchanged.
