= Yuba-Sutter Transit =

Municipal public bus transit service in northern California, US

- Parent: Yuba-Sutter Transit Authority
- Founded: 1975
- Headquarters: 2100 B Street
- Locale: Marysville, California
- Service area: Yuba–Sutter area
- Service type: Bus service
- Routes: 8
- Fuel type: Diesel
- Operator: Storer Transit Systems
- Website: yubasuttertransit.com

The Yuba-Sutter Transit Authority, operating as Yuba-Sutter Transit, is the public transportation agency serving the Yuba–Sutter area in Northern California.

== Service ==
Yuba-Sutter Transit runs six local bus routes in Marysville, Yuba City and surrounding communities, running hourly or half-hourly between 6:30 am and 6:30 pm Mondays through Saturdays. There is also weekday commuter and midday service to Sacramento along Routes 70 and 99; three rural routes to Live Oak, the Yuba County foothills, and Wheatland; and Dial-a-Ride service available to seniors and those with disabilities as both a paratransit and door-to-door service, with general public availability offered after 6:00 pm.

== Fares ==
The basic one-way fare is $1.50 on local fixed routes, $3 on rural routes, and $4.50 on commuter and midday express services. Dial-a-Ride service has a base fare of $3 during the day and $2 after 6:00 pm for senior (65+), Disabled or ADA certified. Up to two children 4 or under may travel free with a paying adult on any route. In addition, on all routes except the commute-hour Sacramento service, a 50% fare discount is provided to seniors 65 or older, youths from 5-18, and disabled riders with approved ID.

Ticket sheets are available in denominations of fifty cents (for $10 per sheet) or seventy-five cents (for $15 per sheet), and they are good on local and rural routes, Dial-a-Ride, and routes serving Sacramento. Monthly passes valid on local fixed routes are available for $30 to the general public and $15 to youths, seniors, and the disabled. Any discount-status passes are also valid on rural routes. For commuter services a monthly commuter pass costs $135, and a combined Yuba-Sutter Transit/Sacramento RT monthly pass for $185.

== Route list ==
=== Local fixed routes ===
Route #	Name	Termini	Places served	Headway	Service hours
1	Yuba City to Yuba College	Walton Terminal; Yuba College	Yuba City Marketplace, Yuba-Sutter Mall, Alturas & Shasta Terminal, Yuba County Government Center, Amtrak Thruway connection, North Beale Transit Center	30 min	6:30 am to 6:30 pm weekdays 8:30 am to 5:30 pm Saturdays
2 (Note: 2A clockwise, 2B counter-clockwise)	Yuba City Loop	—N/a	Walton Terminal, Senior Center, Alturas & Shasta Terminal, Yuba-Sutter Fairgrounds, Yuba City High School	30 min	6:30 am to 6:30 pm weekdays 8:30 am to 5:30 pm Saturdays
3	Olivehurst to Yuba College	Johnson Park; Yuba College	McGowan Park & Ride, North Beale Transit Center	30 min	6:30 am to 6:30 pm weekdays 8:30 am to 5:30 pm Saturdays
4 (Note: 4A clockwise, 4B counter-clockwise)	Marysville Loop	—N/a	Alturas & Shasta Terminal, Marysville High School, Yuba County Government Center, Amtrak Thruway connection, North Beale Transit Center, Peach Tree Clinic	60 min	6:30 am to 6:30 pm weekdays 8:30 am to 5:30 pm Saturdays
5	Southwest Yuba City	Walton Terminal; South Yuba City	Bogue Park & Ride, Winco Center, Yuba City Marketplace	60 min	6:30 am to 6:30 pm weekdays 8:30 am to 5:30 pm Saturdays
6	Linda Shuttle	Yuba College; Edgewater & Rupert	North Beale Transit Center	60 min	6:30 am to 6:30 pm weekdays 8:30 am to 5:30 pm Saturdays

=== Rural ===
All rural routes terminate at the Yuba County Government Center.

Name	Rural terminus	Places served	Trips
Foothill	Brownsville	Loma Rica, Willow Glen, Oregon House	Tuesday–Thursday: morning inbound trip, midday round-trip, and afternoon outbound trip
Live Oak	Live Oak	Yuba College Sutter County Center (by reservation)	Daily: morning inbound trip, midday round-trip, and afternoon outbound trip
Wheatland	Wheatland	North Beale Transit Center	Tuesday–Thursday: morning inbound trip and afternoon outbound trip

=== Commuter ===
Yuba-Sutter Transit provides nine scheduled peak-hour commuter bus runs each in the morning and afternoon, three along Routes 70 and six along Route 99. Morning commuter buses first depart for Sacramento at 5:20 am, with the last morning bus arriving in Sacramento at 7:45 am. The first bus in the afternoon leaves downtown Sacramento at 3:45 pm, while the last bus arrives at the Yuba County Government Center at 6:35 pm. Three midday express buses to and from Sacramento run during off-peak hours, arriving in Sacramento around 9:00 am, noon, and 2:00 pm.

== Current fleet ==
There are 51 buses in the Yuba-Sutter Transit fleet currently in revenue service. Each bus uses diesel fuel and has room for two wheelchair passengers.

Fleet numbers (Qty.)	Manufacturer	Model	Year	Seated capacity	Notes
1681–1686 (6)	Glaval	Titan II 4500	2014	16	Used for Dial-a-Ride and rural service
1690–1691 (10)	Glaval	Universal	2019	16	Used for Dial-a-Ride and rural service
2721–2725, 2727 (6)	NABI/Optima	Opus 29SD	2008	27	Used for local fixed route service
3150–3160 (11)	Gillig	Low Floor G27B	2019	31	Used for local fixed-route service
3230–3240 (11)	Gillig	35DD	2013–14	32	Used for local fixed-route service
5701–5713 (13)	MCI	D4500	2010, 2012, 2018	57	Used for Sacramento commuter service
