= E-tran =

Elk Grove public transit system

e-tran
- Parent: Regional Transit
- Founded: 2005
- Headquarters: 10250 Iron Rock Way,
- Locale: Elk Grove, California
- Service type: bus service, paratransit
- Routes: 20
- Operator: Regional Transit
- Website: Elk Grove Transit

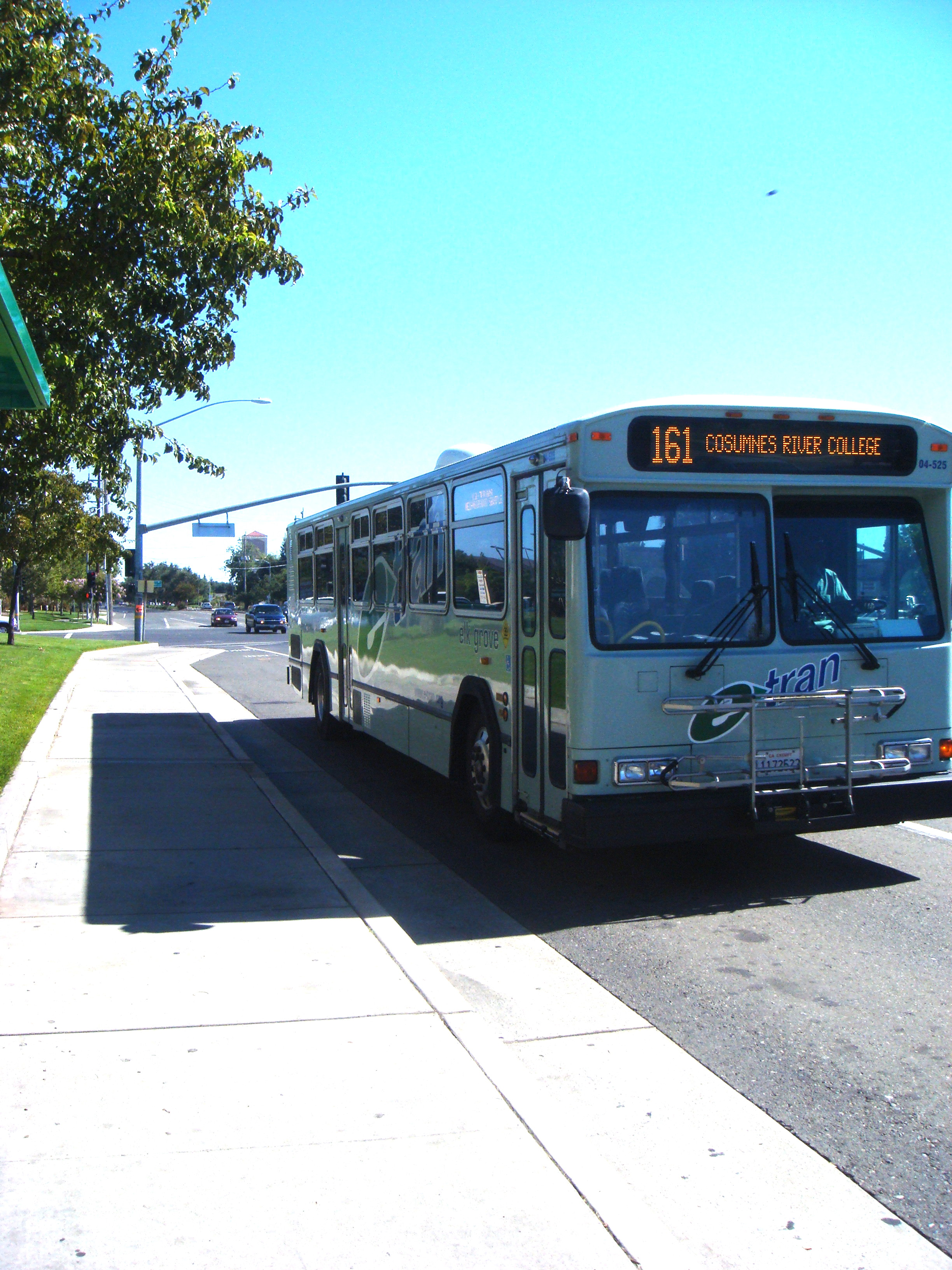
161, Cosumnes River College now the 156 route

e-tran was the public transit system for the city of Elk Grove, California and parts of south Sacramento. Public transit in these areas was operated by Sacramento Regional Transit District (SacRT) until 2005, when E-tran began operation under the City of Elk Grove, with bus operations contracted to MV Transportation; subsequently, SacRT took up the contract to operate E-tran in 2019 and then re-annexed E-tran in 2021.

== History ==
SacRT provided local public transit service in Elk Grove until 2005. In 2003, the City evaluated the current contract with SacRT, which would expire in June 2004, and decided to operate its own public transit system, creating E-tran. E-tran began service on January 2, 2005 under a contractual service agreement with MV Transportation.

In 2007, it was named as an "Outstanding Public Transportation System" by the American Public Transportation Association (APTA). APTA lauded the agency's deployment of the "better bus", fitted with high-back reclining seats, parcel racks, wireless Internet access, and bicycle racks, increasing transit access to its citizens, and maximizing connections to other agencies, including SacRT, Amtrak, Capitol Corridor, and Greyhound, providing a "truly viable alternative to the automobile".

On July 1, 2019 SacRT resumed operations of bus service in Elk Grove, assuming the operational contract that was previously held by MV Transportation. On July 1, 2021, SacRT annexed E-tran.

== Operations ==
e-tran was Elk Grove's own bus system. Routes were coordinated with SacRT buses and light rail and South County Transit/Link (SCT/LINK) to areas outside the city. Main transfer points are at the Cosumnes River College, Meadowview Light Rail Station and Laguna Town Hall. Services were funded with Transportation Development Act (TDA) and Federal Transit Administration (FTA) funds.

== Route list ==
=== Commuter Routes ===
==== To Downtown Sacramento ====
- 10 - Big Horn Blvd. & Civic Center Dr. (via Calvine Rd., Hwy. 99)
- 11 - Franklin High Rd. & Whitelock Pkwy.
- 12 - Big Horn Blvd. & Civic Center Dr. (via Laguna Blvd., I-5)
- 13 - Elkmont Wy. & Iron Rock Wy.
- 14 - Big Horn Blvd. & Bruceville Rd.
- 15 - Bond Rd. & Bradshaw Rd
- 16 - Elk Grove Blvd. & Clarke Farms Dr.
- 17 - Calvine Rd. & Armand George Wy.

==== From Downtown Sacramento (reverse commute) ====
- 18 - Longleaf Dr. & Laguna Blvd.

==== To Butterfield Light Rail Station ====
- 19 - Laguna Blvd. & Harbor Point Dr.

=== Local Routes ===
* = route includes Saturday service

- 110* - Promenade Pkwy. & Bilby (Sky River Casino) to Cosumnes River College
- 111 - Vaux Ave. & Laguna Main St. to Big Horn Blvd. & Civic Center Dr. (via Harbour Point Dr.)
- 112 - Vaux Ave. & Laguna Main St. to Big Horn Blvd. & Civic Center Dr. (via Franklin Blvd.)
- 113* - Vaux Ave. & Laguna Main St. to Elkmont Wy. & Iron Rock Wy.
- 114* - Vaux Ave. & Laguna Main St. to Armand George Wy. & Calvine Rd.
- 115 - Elk Grove Blvd. & Clarke Farms Dr. to Cosumnes River College (via Bond Rd., Sheldon Rd. [among others])
- 116* - Elk Grove Blvd. & Clarke Farms Dr. to Cosumnes River College (via Elk Grove Blvd., Bruceville Rd.)

== Fares ==
E-tran fare structure
Group	Fare Type	Single	Transfer	Daily Pass	10-Ride Pass	Unrestricted (commuter) Monthly Pass	Local Monthly Pass
General Public	Basic	$2.25	$0.50	$6.00	$22.50	$100.00	$80.00
Student	Discount	$1.10	$0.50	$3.00	$11.00	$50.00	$40.00
Senior/Disabled/Medicare/Military	Discount	$1.10	$0.50	$3.00	$11.00	$50.00	$40.00
Children under 5/Group pass	Free	$0.00	$0.00	$0.00	$0.00	$0.00	$0.00

== Fleet ==
e-tran previously operated older Gold Coast Transit (formerly South Coast Area Transit) CNG buses from Oxnard, CA, and Akron Metro Regional Transit Authority CNG buses from Akron, Ohio painted with the e-tran paint scheme. The first of the new CNG Orion buses began arriving in Elk Grove the fall of 2008.

=== Inoperational Fleet ===
In September 2008, the original 21 hybrid-electric buses that were used when the transit system opened on January 2, 2005 were pulled from service. This was due to bus fires that happened on several occasions with only the hybrid-electric buses. These buses are now parked in a field at the e-tran maintenance yard in southern Elk Grove while the Board Members try to get their money back ($10,000,000) to fix the buses.

== Paratransit ==
E-Tran had its own Paratransit service called e-van. Vans were painted in e-tran paint scheme, but branded "e-van" instead of "e-tran" on side, and came door-to-door to pick up disabled/ADA certified passengers that had made reservations.
