= Raley's Supermarkets =

Supermarket chain

Raley's Family of Fine Stores

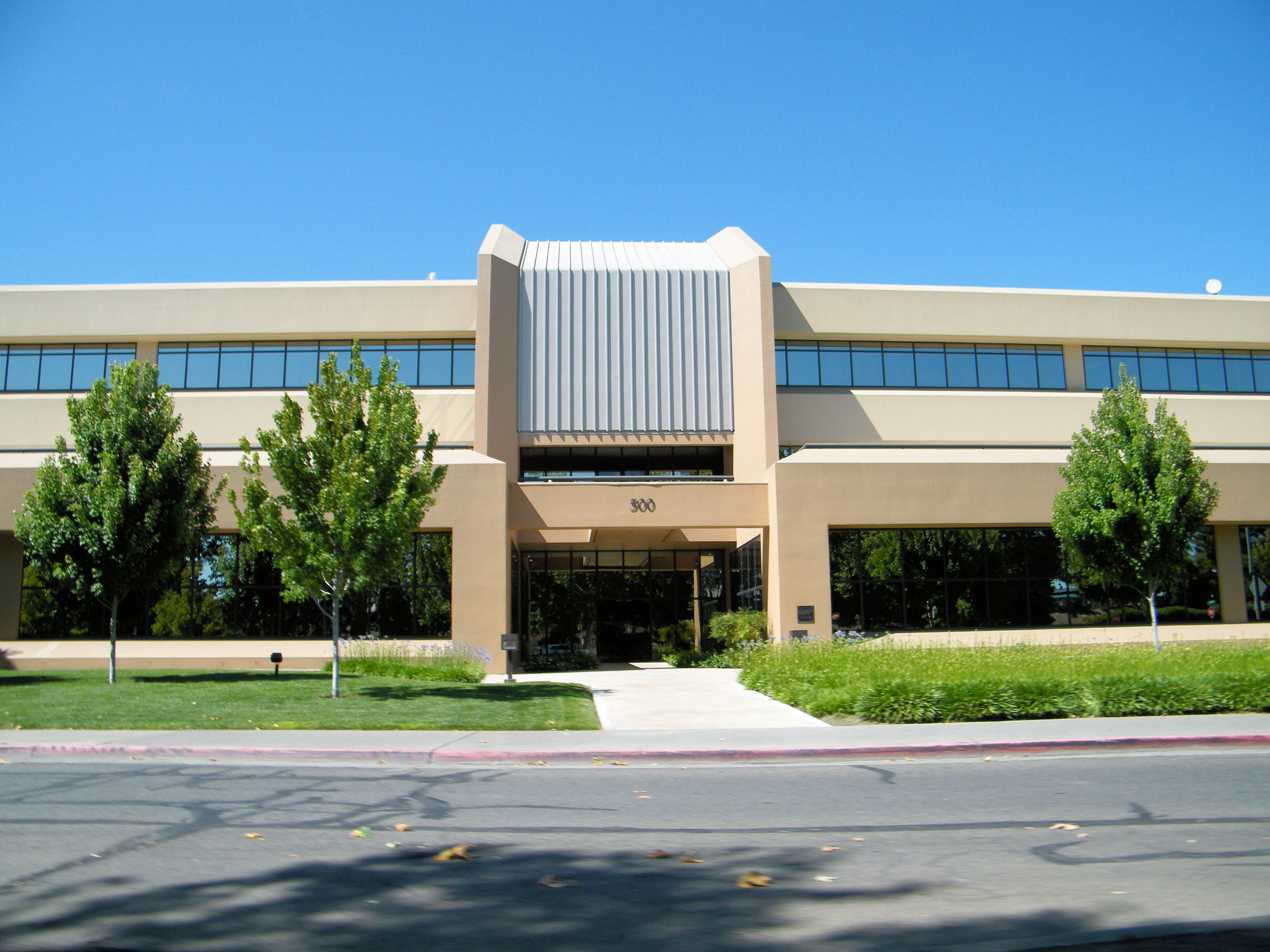
- Raley's headquarters in West Sacramento
- Trade name: Raley's Supermarkets
- Type: Private; family business
- Industry: Retail (grocery)
- Founded: February 16, 1935; 91 years ago in Placerville, California, U.S.
- Founder: Thomas P. Raley
- Headquarters: West Sacramento, California, U.S.
- Number of locations: 115 stores As of 2025
- Key people: Michael Teel, Owner, Chairman, President & CEO
- Products: Bakery, dairy, deli, frozen foods, general grocery, meat, pharmacy, produce, seafood, snacks, prepared foods
- Owner: Raley family (100%)
- Number of employees: 11,500 (2025)
- Website: raleys.com

Raley's Supermarkets is an independent, family-owned American grocery and retail technology company headquartered in West Sacramento, California. Raley's was founded in 1935 by Thomas P. Raley in Placerville, California.

The Raley's Companies brands include Raley's, Bel Air, Nob Hill Foods, Raley's O-N-E Market, Bashas', Bashas' Diné Market, Food City, (Note: Not to be confused with Food City, an unrelated supermarket chain in the Southeastern United States) AJ's Fine Foods, Eddie's Country Store and FieldTRUE Organic. These brands do business in California, Nevada, Arizona, New Mexico, Oregon, Washington and Alaska, as well as the Tribal Nations of Navajo Nation, White Mountain Apache, and San Carlos Apache. Raley's currently employs 23,000 people.

== History ==
The company was founded on February 16, 1935, by Thomas P. Raley in Placerville, California, as Raley's Drive-In Market. Raley ran the company until his death on December 27, 1991, at the age of 88. Raley's purchased Bel Air Markets in 1993, Nob Hill Foods in 1997 and Scolari's Food & Drug Company in 2018. The company also started Food Source in 1995 and Market 5-ONE-5 in 2018.

In 1998, the company had revenue of $2.5 billion. In June 1999, Albertsons announced plans to sell its 19 stores in Las Vegas, Nevada, to Raley's, which also planned to purchase eight Albertson's stores in New Mexico. For five years, Raley's had been searching for ways to expand the company, with specific interest in the Las Vegas and Salt Lake City, Utah, markets. At the time, Raley's was the 38th largest supermarket chain in the United States, with 150 stores, including Bel Air Markets, Food Source and Nob Hill Foods. The company had 17,500 employees across its four divisions. Raley's opened its Las Vegas stores later in 1999, and had plans to build additional locations in the Las Vegas area.

At the time, Michael Teel – the grandson of Thomas Raley – was the company's president and chief executive officer (CEO). Joyce Teel, the mother of Michael Teel, was the company's owner. William J. Coyne, the company's first general counsel, became the chief operating officer in February 2002. Michael Teel resigned as president in April 2002, to pursue "personal endeavors." Coyne replaced Teel as president.

In September 2002, Kroger announced plans to purchase Raley's 18 store locations in Las Vegas, with intentions of converting them into Smith's and Food 4 Less stores. Raley's stated that slow growth and local competition were reasons for selling the stores. The revenue from the sale was to be used to build and renovate stores in Reno, Nevada, and Northern California. The Federal Trade Commission approved the sale in November 2002. Raley's stores in Las Vegas began closing later that month. As of November 2009, three Raley's supermarkets had been awarded Greenchill Partnership Gold-Level Certification by the U.S. Environmental Protection Agency for environmentally friendly refrigeration technology.

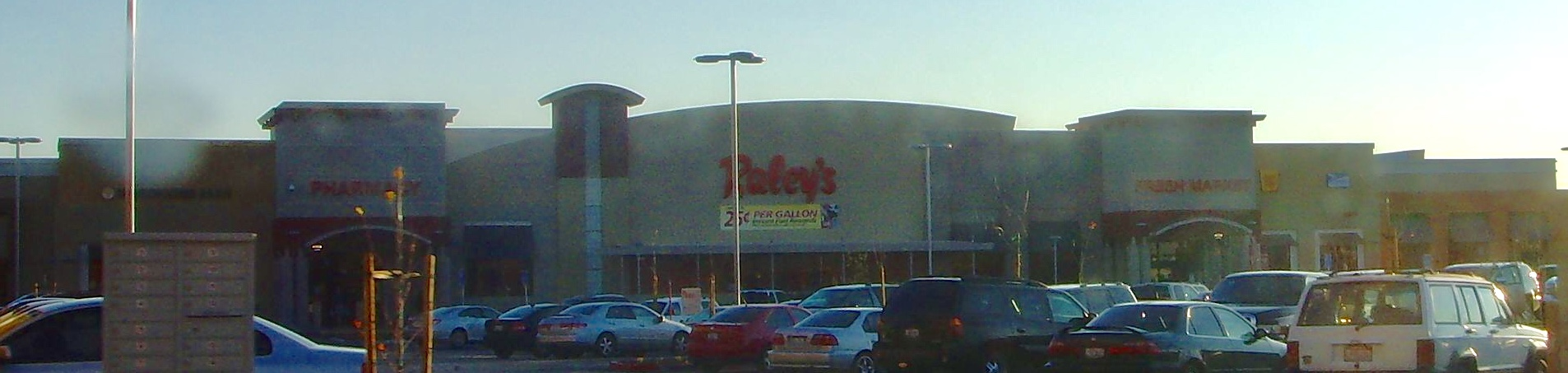
A Raley's in Modesto, California

As of 2012, Raley's operates 128 stores, 40 of them in the Greater Sacramento area. Those stores control the city's largest market share: 28%, down from 30% in 2007 and 34% in 2003, according to Metro Market Studies of Tucson, Arizona. By comparison, other local market shares are Safeway at 16.7%, Costco at 11.9% and Save Mart Supermarkets at 9.2%. However, the company is suffering from increased competition in the region as well as the poor economy, and had more than 150 corporate layoffs in 2011 and closed several stores in 2012.

Supermarket News ranks Raley's 38th in the "Top 75 North American Food Retailers" based on sales of $3.4 billion. Consumer Reports surveys rank Raley's among the top U.S. supermarket chains, in particular for customer service. The same held true for 2012, although the chain fell from 4th nationwide in 2009 to 8th.

Thomas Raley's family still controls the company. His grandson, Michael Teel, became the majority shareholder in mid-2015 and currently serves as chairman. Keith Knopf was named Raley's chief operating officer on June 1, 2015, and added 'President' to his title in February 2017. He was then promoted to president and chief executive officer on September 27, 2018. Knopf has worked with May Co. Department Stores and Kohl's retail chain in the past.

In 2004, Raley's opened its first Aisle 1 brand gas station in Galt, California, and eventually grew Aisle 1 into 13 locations in Northern California and Nevada. Raley's sold all 13 Aisle 1 locations to Anabi Oil in December 2018. The Sacramento River Cats, Triple-A affiliate of the San Francisco Giants, are based at what is now named Sutter Health Park; it was previously named Raley Field from 2000 to 2019.

On October 28, 2019, Raley's announced plans to close 27 in–store pharmacies. The company transferred prescriptions from affected stores to various CVS Pharmacy, Rite Aid and Walgreens locations.

In 2020, since the beginning of the COVID-19 pandemic, Raley's has opened stores in two locations in Greater Sacramento. In April 2020, Raley's opened a 55,000 square feet flagship store in Sacramento's Land Park neighborhood followed by a 35,000 square feet store in Rancho Murieta, which is located in Sacramento County. Raley's and Sacramento Republic have both delivered more than 10,000 meals to local senior citizens and have raised more than $60,000 through online donations which are going towards Indomitable Hands.

Raley's recognized its 85th anniversary with an integrated marketing campaign Good Never Stops.

On December 15, 2021, Raley's acquired the Arizona-based Bashas' Family of Stores — including Bashas', AJ's Fine Foods, and Food City. The 118 Bashas' locations remained open under their respective brands in Arizona.

In 2025, several California county districts attorneys investigated the chain for unfair business practices, including selling expired OTC drugs. The company settled by paying more than $400,000 in fines.

On June 6, 2025, the last remaining Food Source, located in Stockton, California — converted from a Raley's in 2016 — closed, ending Raley's discount grocery format.

== Banners ==
Raley's banners by number of locations (not including banners from Bashas')
Raley's	76
Bel Air Markets	21
Nob Hill Foods (Note: Not to be confused with Knob Hill Farms, a now–defunct Canadian supermarket chain)	18
Raley's O-N-E Market	4
Total stores	119

== eCart ==
eCart is Raley's e-commerce platform which offers parking lot pickup for customers. Through eCart, the store has the capacity to process up to 250 online orders for pickup or delivery on a daily basis. Pickup customers have access to covered, pull-through parking spots at some locations, and their proximity to eCart storage reduces the wait time for shoppers when they arrive.
