= Washington Unified School District (Yolo County, California) =

School district in California, United States

Address
- 930 Westacre Road West Sacramento, California, 95691; United States

District information
- Type: Public
- Grades: K–12
- NCES District ID: 0641580

Students and staff
- Students: 7,521
- Teachers: 349.28
- Staff: 378.08
- Student–teacher ratio: 21.53

Other information
- Website: www.wusd.k12.ca.us

Washington Unified School District (WUSD) is a school district headquartered in West Sacramento, California.

It was named after the former settlement of Washington, which later incorporated as West Sacramento in 1987. The district originated from the Washington Grammar School that opened in 1917.

The district is in Yolo County and includes virtually all of West Sacramento.

== Schools ==
Secondary

- River City High School
- Washington Middle College High School
- Yolo High School

K-8 schools

- Bridgeway Island
- Elkhorn
- Riverbank
- Southport
- Stonegate
- Westfield
- Westmore Oaks
