= Laguna West-Lakeside, Elk Grove, California =

Community in Elk Grove, California, United States

Laguna West
- Community (Neighborhood)
- Laguna West
- Interactive map of Laguna West
- Country: United States
- State: California
- County: Sacramento County
- City: Elk Grove
- Established: Dec 15, 2003
- Time zone: UTC-8 (Pacific Standard Time)
  - Summer (DST): UTC-7 (Pacific Daylight Time)

Laguna West is a New Urbanist community built around a recreational lake and annexed into Elk Grove, Sacramento County, California in 2003. The population of Laguna West was 8,414 at the 2000 census, prior to annexation. The community was planned with an emphasis on pedestrian-oriented design, waterfront access, green spaces, and family amenities.

== Geography ==
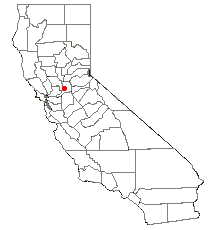
Location of Laguna West-Lakeside, California

Laguna West is located at 38°25′5″N 121°28′9″W. According to the United States Census Bureau, the census-designated place (CDP) has a total area of 2.2 square miles (5.7 km^{2}), with 2.1 square miles (5.4 km^{2}) of land and 0.1 square miles (0.26 km^{2}) (4.93%) of water.

Laguna West covers approximately 1,300 acres and is centered around a 73-acre private recreational lake maintained by the Laguna West Homeowners Association (HOA). Heron Lake, a 39-acre body of water, is a secondary body of water four blocks south of the main lake. The design of the community includes pedestrian walkways, canopy trails, and interconnected parks, in keeping with Elk Grove's green standards.

Laguna West is bordered by:

West: Stone Lakes National Wildlife Refuge, a federally protected wetland area with boardwalks and guided paddling routes, which connects to the Sacramento River.

East: the Valley Hi Country Club's Billy Bell golf course.

North: Delta Shores, a regional retail center featuring a Regal cineplex, dining options, and cycle paths linking it to Laguna West.

South: Protected wetlands that extend toward the under-construction Capital SouthEast Connector Expressway.

Local transportation within the community includes golf carts, beach cruiser bicycles, and pedal boats, with designated launch points for kayaks, paddleboards, and personal watercraft.

== Demographics ==
According to the census of 2000, there were 8,414 people, 3,032 households, and 2,277 families residing in the CDP. The population density was 3,971.3 inhabitants per square mile (1,533.3/km^{2}), with 3,127 housing units at an average density of 1,475.9 per square mile (569.8/km^{2}). The racial makeup was 54.43% White, 10.42% African American, 0.32% Native American, 20.99% Asian, 0.45% Pacific Islander, 5.23% from other races, and 8.15% from two or more races. Hispanic or Latino individuals comprised 13.20% of the population.

Of the 3,032 households, 43.8% had children under 18, 64.4% were married couples living together, 7.3% had a female householder with no husband present, and 24.9% were non-families. Individuals made up 17.9% of households, with 3.9% having someone living alone aged 65 or older. The average household size was 2.78, and the average family size was 3.20. The population distribution was 29.0% under the age of 18, 5.4% from 18 to 24, 43.3% from 25 to 44, 16.9% from 45 to 64, and 5.3% aged 65 or older. The median age was 33 years. For every 100 females, there were 92.5 males, and for every 100 females age 18 and over, there were 88.3 males.

== Master Planned Community ==
=== Design ===
Laguna West was designed by Peter Calthorpe following New Urbanism principles. The planning included features intended to encourage pedestrian activity, such as modest front yards, front porches, alleyways, and narrow streets with wide sidewalks. Each house was planned to include two trees and concrete planters, known as "tree wells," positioned to serve as parking dividers and to create a continuous canopy.

=== Development ===
Developer and later politician Phil Angelides lists Laguna West among his ventures. In his 2010 Apollo Alliance biography, he noted that in the 1980s he was involved in planning and building communities based on smart growth principles, a concept that contributed to later discussions on sustainable community development.

== Parks and recreation ==
The community includes a network of parks and public recreational facilities:

Town Square Park: A central park with a concert amphitheater, soccer fields, and playgrounds. Community events include a summer concert series, Fourth of July celebrations, farmers markets, and holiday tree lighting ceremonies.

Bartholomew Park: A lakeside park featuring a rose garden and woodland-themed playground.

== Transportation ==
Laguna West is set to benefit from several transportation projects:

Valley Rail Project: The ACE Train, currently under construction, will offer express service from the Laguna Boulevard and Babson Drive station to Sacramento (in 10–15 minutes) and to Silicon Valley, with service expected to begin in Q4 2025/Q1 2026.

Capital SouthEast Connector Expressway: A project valued at approximately $600 million intended to improve connectivity to Interstate 5 and facilitate regional travel.

== Education ==
Laguna West is served by Joseph Sims, Stonelake, and Elliot Ranch Elementary Schools, which have been rated 10/10 by GreatSchools and offer Gifted and Talented Education (GATE) programs. In addition, the community is in proximity to UC Davis Aggie Square, scheduled to open in 2026, which will provide access to programs in agriculture, veterinary medicine, and related fields.

== Real Estate ==
Residences are primarily single family homes, each located within a 10-minute walk of parks, schools, and sports facilities. Many were developer-built, with parkview lots designated for semi-custom construction, and waterfront lots sold individually for fully bespoke designs.

=== Green Standards ===
Elk Grove is a signatory of the California Green Building Standards Code (CALGreen), which mandates sustainable construction practices. The city adopted CALGreen 2022, which enforces regulations related to planning, design, water conservation, material use, and environmental quality. The city has also implemented California Title 24, Part 6, which addresses energy efficiency standards.

== Regional connectivity ==
Laguna West is located within a 10-minute drive of Downtown Sacramento and the greater Elk Grove area.

=== Elk Grove ===
Elk Grove has undergone redevelopment projects such as "The Village" and "Project Elevate," which include initiatives to revitalize the historic town center with shops and restaurants. The city offers family-oriented recreational facilities including an aquatics center, District56, and Oasis Park. A Sacramento Bee article identified Elk Grove as a favorable location for raising a family.

=== Sacramento ===
Upon completion, a 10–15 minute ACE train ride will connect Laguna West to Downtown Sacramento, providing access to:

Golden 1 Center: Home of the NBA's Sacramento Kings (500 David J Stern Walk, Sacramento, CA 95814).

Sacramento Railyards: A mixed-use development project valued at approximately $7 billion.

Sutter Health Park: Located at 400 Ballpark Dr, West Sacramento, CA 95691, home to the Sacramento A’s MLB team.

=== Future Developments ===
Planned developments in the region include:

Sky River Casino Resort: Slated for 2026, located at 5000 Sky River Parkway, Elk Grove, CA 95757.

Hood Waterfront Resort: A resort concept featuring marina facilities on the Sacramento River.

Aggie Square: UC Davis’s innovation hub, nearing completion.

Sacramento Zoo Relocation: Plans exist to relocate the Sacramento Zoo to Elk Grove by 2030.

== Politics ==
In the state legislature, Laguna West–Lakeside is part of the 5th Senate District, represented by Democrat Lois Wolk, and is divided between the 10th and 15th Assembly Districts, represented by Democrats Stephanie Nguyen and Kevin Mullin respectively. Federally, Laguna West is located in California's 7th congressional district, represented by Democrat Doris Matsui.
