= Folsom Boulevard =

Road in Sacramento County, California, United States

- Maintained by: City of Sacramento Department of Transportation, Caltrans, County of Sacramento Department of Transportation (SACDOT), City of Rancho Cordova Public Works and City of Folsom Public Works
- Location: Sacramento; Rancho Cordova; Folsom
- West end: 38.5751°N 121.4878°W
- Major junctions: SR 16 in Sacramento; Watt Avenue near Sacramento; CR E2 in Rancho Cordova; US 50 near Folsom
- East end: 38.6841°N 121.1792°W

Folsom Boulevard is a major east–west arterial in Sacramento County, California, United States. Its western terminus is at Alhambra Boulevard in the East Sacramento section of Sacramento and its eastern terminus is at Greenback Lane in Folsom.

The actual road, however, runs from the California State Capitol (at 15th Street) in Sacramento to the city of Auburn in Placer County and has various changes of name along the way, which includes Capitol Avenue (old M Street), Folsom-Auburn Road and Auburn-Folsom Road.

For much of the route, it runs nearly parallel with U.S. Route 50 and was that highway's alignment before the freeway was completed in the 1970s.

== Route description ==
=== Sacramento ===
Folsom Boulevard begins in the East Sacramento neighborhood (in a southeasterly direction) as a two-lane roadway, expanding to four lanes at 59th Street. After passing the intersection of 65th Street, Folsom Boulevard is reduced to two lanes as it runs beneath the Union Pacific railroad tracks via a short subway tunnel. After passing under U.S. Route 50, Folsom Boulevard once again expands to four lanes and remains that way at least for the remainder of the route. Folsom Boulevard intersects Howe Avenue and Power Inn Road, overlapping State Route 16 for roughly 1/2 mile (0.8 km). SR 16 departs Folsom Boulevard for Jackson Road and Folsom Boulevard turns in a northeasterly direction, paralleling the Sacramento Regional Transit light rail tracks of the Gold Line and an old railroad track maintained by Union Pacific. As it reaches Watt Avenue, Folsom Boulevard leaves the city of Sacramento and into the unincorporated suburb communities of La Riviera and Rosemont.

=== La Riviera/Rosemont/Rancho Cordova ===
Folsom Boulevard continues its northeasterly direction through La Riviera and Rosemont, passing under US 50 for the second time. As it reaches the intersection of Bradshaw Road, Folsom Boulevard enters the city of Rancho Cordova. It then intersects other major intersections, including Mather Field Road, Coloma Road and Zinfandel Drive. Folsom Boulevard passes under US 50 for the third time, intersecting Sunrise Boulevard (County Route E2). It begins to closely parallel US 50 until it intersects Hazel Avenue, leaving Rancho Cordova en route to the city of Folsom.

=== Folsom ===
As Folsom Boulevard reaches Folsom, it meets up with US 50 for a fourth and final time at an interchange. While US 50 continues east towards South Lake Tahoe, Folsom Boulevard turns north towards historic downtown Folsom. It then crosses the American River, and at the intersection of Greenback Lane, ends and turns into Folsom-Auburn Road.

== Landmarks and points of interest ==
- East Lawn Memorial Cemetery
- California State University Sacramento
- Brighton Substation
- Granite Regional Park
- Folsom Premium Outlets
- Historic Folsom

== Major cities ==
- Sacramento, California
- Rancho Cordova, California
- Folsom, California

== Local transportation ==
The Gold Line of Sacramento Regional Transit's light rail line runs along much of Folsom Boulevard. Several stations are located along the corridor and they include:

- College Greens
- Watt/Manlove
- Starfire
- Tiber
- Butterfield
- Mather Field/Mills
- Zinfandel
- Cordova Town Center
- Sunrise
- Hazel
- Iron Point
- Glenn
- Historic Folsom

University/65th Street and Power Inn are nearby stations that also serve Folsom Boulevard.

RT bus routes 21, 26, 78, and 84 operate on portions of Folsom Boulevard.

RT's Elk Grove Transit (formerly e-tran) bus route E19 operates on Folsom Boulevard to provide a connection between the Butterfield station and the city of Elk Grove via Bradshaw Road during peak commuter times.

Folsom Stage Line routes F10 and F30 operate on portions of Folsom Boulevard.

== Major intersections ==
The entire route is in Sacramento County.

Location	mi	km	Destinations	Notes
Sacramento	0.0	0.0	Capitol Avenue	Continuation beyond Alhambra Boulevard; former US 50 west / SR 16 west
Sacramento	0.0	0.0	Alhambra Boulevard	Western terminus
Sacramento	3.4	5.5	SR 16 west (Howe Avenue) to US 50 / Power Inn Road	Western end of SR 16 concurrency
Sacramento	4.0	6.4	SR 16 east (Jackson Road) / Notre Dame Drive – Jackson	Eastern end of SR 16 concurrency
Rancho Cordova	12.2	19.6	CR E2 (Sunrise Boulevard) to US 50	
Rancho Cordova	15.5	24.9	CR E3 (Hazel Avenue) / Nimbus Road	
Folsom	16.8	27.0	US 50 (El Dorado Freeway) – South Lake Tahoe, Sacramento	Interchange; US 50 exit 23
Folsom	19.5	31.4	Sutter Street – Historic District	Interchange; eastbound exit only
Folsom	19.7	31.7	Sutter Street (via Reading Street) – Historic District	Interchange; westbound left exit and right entrance
Folsom	20.2	32.5	Greenback Lane	Eastern terminus
Folsom	20.2	32.5	Folsom–Auburn Road	Continuation beyond Greenback Lane
1.000 mi = 1.609 km; 1.000 km = 0.621 mi: Concurrency terminus; Incomplete access
