= 23rd Street station (Sacramento) =

Light rail station in Sacramento, California, United States

23rd Street
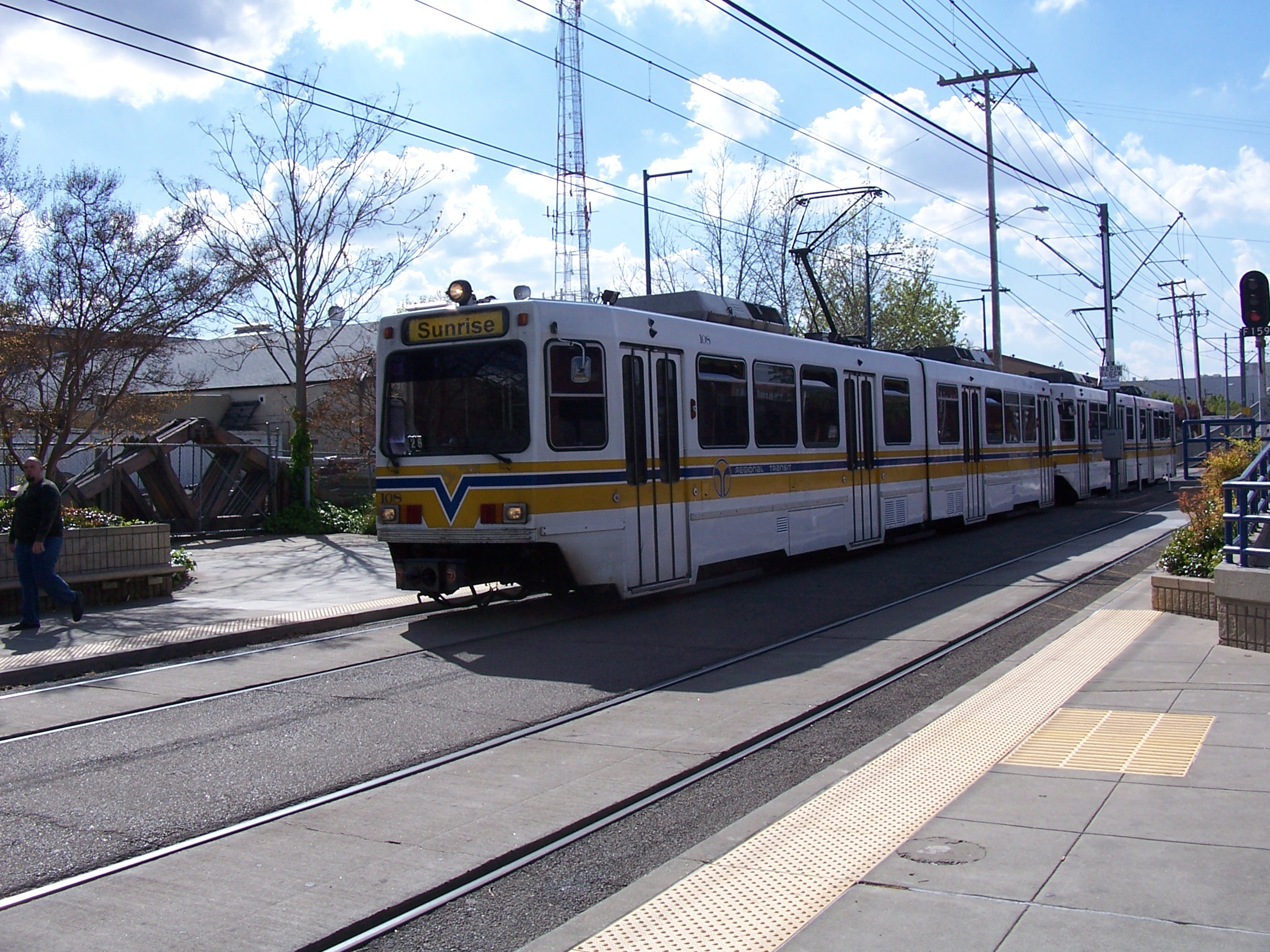
- A Sunrise-bound train departs 23rd Street

General information
- Location: 23rd Street and R Street; Sacramento, California; United States
- Coordinates: 38°33′59.86″N 121°28′44.46″W
- Owner: Sacramento RT
- Platforms: 2 side platforms

Construction
- Structure type: At-grade
- Cycle facilities: Lockers
- Accessible: Yes

History
- Opened: September 5, 1987; 38 years ago

Services
Preceding station	SacRT	Following station
16th Street toward Sacramento Valley Station	Gold Line	29th Street toward Historic Folsom
Location

23rd Street is a side platformed Sacramento RT light rail station in the Midtown neighborhood of Sacramento, California, United States. The station was opened on September 5, 1987, and is operated by the Sacramento Regional Transit District. It is served by the Gold Line. The station is located at the intersection of 23rd and R Streets. It also serves a portion of the Richmond Grove neighborhood.
