= La Riviera, California =

Census-designated place in the United States

La Riviera
- census-designated place
- Interactive map of La Riviera
- Location in California Location in the United States
- Coordinates: 38°34′0″N 121°21′24″W
- Country: United States
- State: California
- County: Sacramento

Area
  - Total: 2.042 sq mi (5.29 km^{2})
  - Land: 1.900 sq mi (4.92 km^{2})
  - Water: 0.142 sq mi (0.37 km^{2}) 6.98%
- Elevation: 52 ft (16 m)

Population (2020)
  - Total: 11,252
  - Density: 5,922/sq mi (2,287/km^{2})
- Time zone: UTC-8 (PST)
  - Summer (DST): UTC-7 (PDT)
- ZIP code: 95826 & 95827
- Area codes: 916, 279
- FIPS code: 06-40410
- GNIS feature ID: 1867035

La Riviera is a census-designated place (CDP) in Sacramento County, California, United States. It is part of the Sacramento metropolitan area. The population was 11,252 at the 2020 census, up from 10,802 at the 2010 census. La Riviera is a primarily residential neighborhood located between the American River on the north side and Highway 50 on the southern border.

== Geography ==
La Riviera is located at 38°34′0″N 121°21′24″W (38.566773, -121.356772).

According to the United States Census Bureau, the CDP has a total area of 2.0 square miles (5.2 km^{2}), of which 1.9 square miles (4.9 km^{2}) is land and 0.14 square miles (0.36 km^{2}) (6.98%) is water.

== Demographics ==
Historical population
Census	Pop.	Note	%±
1980	10,906		—
1990	10,986		0.7%
2000	10,273		−6.5%
2010	10,802		5.1%
2020	11,252		4.2%
U.S. Decennial Census 1980; 1990 2000 2010

=== 2020 census ===
As of the 2020 census, La Riviera had a population of 11,252 and a population density of 5,922.1 inhabitants per square mile (2,286.5/km^{2}).

The age distribution was 19.0% under the age of 18, 10.6% aged 18 to 24, 31.7% aged 25 to 44, 22.9% aged 45 to 64, and 16.0% aged 65 or older. The median age was 36.4 years. For every 100 females, there were 98.9 males, and for every 100 females age 18 and over there were 96.8 males age 18 and over.

The census reported that 98.9% of the population lived in households, 1.0% lived in non-institutionalized group quarters, and 0.1% were institutionalized. There were 4,592 households, of which 26.0% had children under the age of 18 living in them. Of all households, 36.0% were married-couple households, 9.4% were cohabiting couple households, 23.9% had a male householder with no spouse or partner present, and 30.6% had a female householder with no spouse or partner present. About 28.4% of households were made up of individuals, and 10.7% had someone living alone who was 65 years of age or older. The average household size was 2.42. There were 2,727 families (59.4% of all households).

There were 4,793 housing units at an average density of 2,522.6 units per square mile (974.0 units/km^{2}), of which 95.8% were occupied and 4.2% were vacant. The homeowner vacancy rate was 0.8% and the rental vacancy rate was 4.9%. Of occupied housing units, 53.9% were owner-occupied and 46.1% were occupied by renters.

100.0% of residents lived in urban areas, while 0.0% lived in rural areas.

Racial composition as of the 2020 census
Race	Number	Percent
White	6,225	55.3%
Black or African American	1,167	10.4%
American Indian and Alaska Native	99	0.9%
Asian	987	8.8%
Native Hawaiian and Other Pacific Islander	102	0.9%
Some other race	1,021	9.1%
Two or more races	1,651	14.7%
Hispanic or Latino (of any race)	2,357	20.9%

=== Demographic estimates ===
In 2023, the US Census Bureau estimated that 14.5% of the population were foreign-born. Of all people aged 5 or older, 77.6% spoke only English at home, 6.6% spoke Spanish, 7.6% spoke other Indo-European languages, 6.7% spoke Asian or Pacific Islander languages, and 1.5% spoke other languages. Of those aged 25 or older, 91.5% were high school graduates and 37.9% had a bachelor's degree.

=== Income and poverty ===
The median household income in 2023 was $91,111, and the per capita income was $43,108. About 4.8% of families and 10.3% of the population were below the poverty line.

=== 2010 census ===
The 2010 United States census reported that La Riviera had a population of 10,802. The population density was 5,164.6 inhabitants per square mile (1,994.1/km^{2}). The racial makeup of La Riviera was 7,315 (67.7%) White, 1,084 (10.0%) African American, 76 (0.7%) Native American, 766 (7.1%) Asian, 87 (0.8%) Pacific Islander, 671 (6.2%) from other races, and 803 (7.4%) from two or more races. Hispanic or Latino of any race were 1,756 persons (16.3%).

The Census reported that 10,715 people (99.2% of the population) lived in households, 15 (0.1%) lived in non-institutionalized group quarters, and 72 (0.7%) were institutionalized.

There were 4,475 households, out of which 1,170 (26.1%) had children under the age of 18 living in them, 1,663 (37.2%) were opposite-sex married couples living together, 581 (13.0%) had a female householder with no husband present, 243 (5.4%) had a male householder with no wife present. There were 339 (7.6%) unmarried opposite-sex partnerships, and 60 (1.3%) same-sex married couples or partnerships. 1,335 households (29.8%) were made up of individuals, and 357 (8.0%) had someone living alone who was 65 years of age or older. The average household size was 2.39. There were 2,487 families (55.6% of all households); the average family size was 2.98.

The age distribution was 2,117 people (19.6%) under the age of 18, 1,483 people (13.7%) aged 18 to 24, 3,134 people (29.0%) aged 25 to 44, 2,691 people (24.9%) aged 45 to 64, and 1,377 people (12.7%) who were 65 years of age or older. The median age was 35.1 years. For every 100 females, there were 100.4 males. For every 100 females age 18 and over, there were 98.3 males.

There were 4,762 housing units at an average density of 2,276.8 per square mile (879.1/km^{2}), of which 2,460 (55.0%) were owner-occupied, and 2,015 (45.0%) were occupied by renters. The homeowner vacancy rate was 1.8%; the rental vacancy rate was 7.6%. 5,635 people (52.2% of the population) lived in owner-occupied housing units and 5,080 people (47.0%) lived in rental housing units.

== Transportation ==
La Riviera is located on the "Gold Line" of Regional Transit's light rail line. The Watt/Manlove, Starfire, Tiber, and Butterfield light rail stations are located in La Riviera.

== Commercial and industry ==
The Glenbrook Shopping Center on La Riviera Drive at the Watt Avenue offramp is the main shopping center for the area. There are also other commercial endeavors located along Folsom Boulevard, the primary street through the area. Near the Butterfield light rail station, the California Franchise Tax Board has a large office complex.

== Education ==
La Riviera is served by both the Sacramento City Unified School District and the Folsom-Cordova School District.

=== High schools ===
Rosemont High School is the high school that serves not only the La Riviera area but the adjacent Rosemont area. It opened in 2003 and is part of the Sacramento City schools.

== Government ==
In the California State Legislature, La Riviera is in the 8th senatorial district, represented by Democrat Angelique Ashby, and in the 6th Assembly district, represented by Democrat Maggy Krell.

In the United States House of Representatives, La Riviera is in California's 6th congressional district, represented by Democrat Ami Bera.
