= 59th Street station (Sacramento) =

Light rail station in Sacramento, California, United States

59th Street
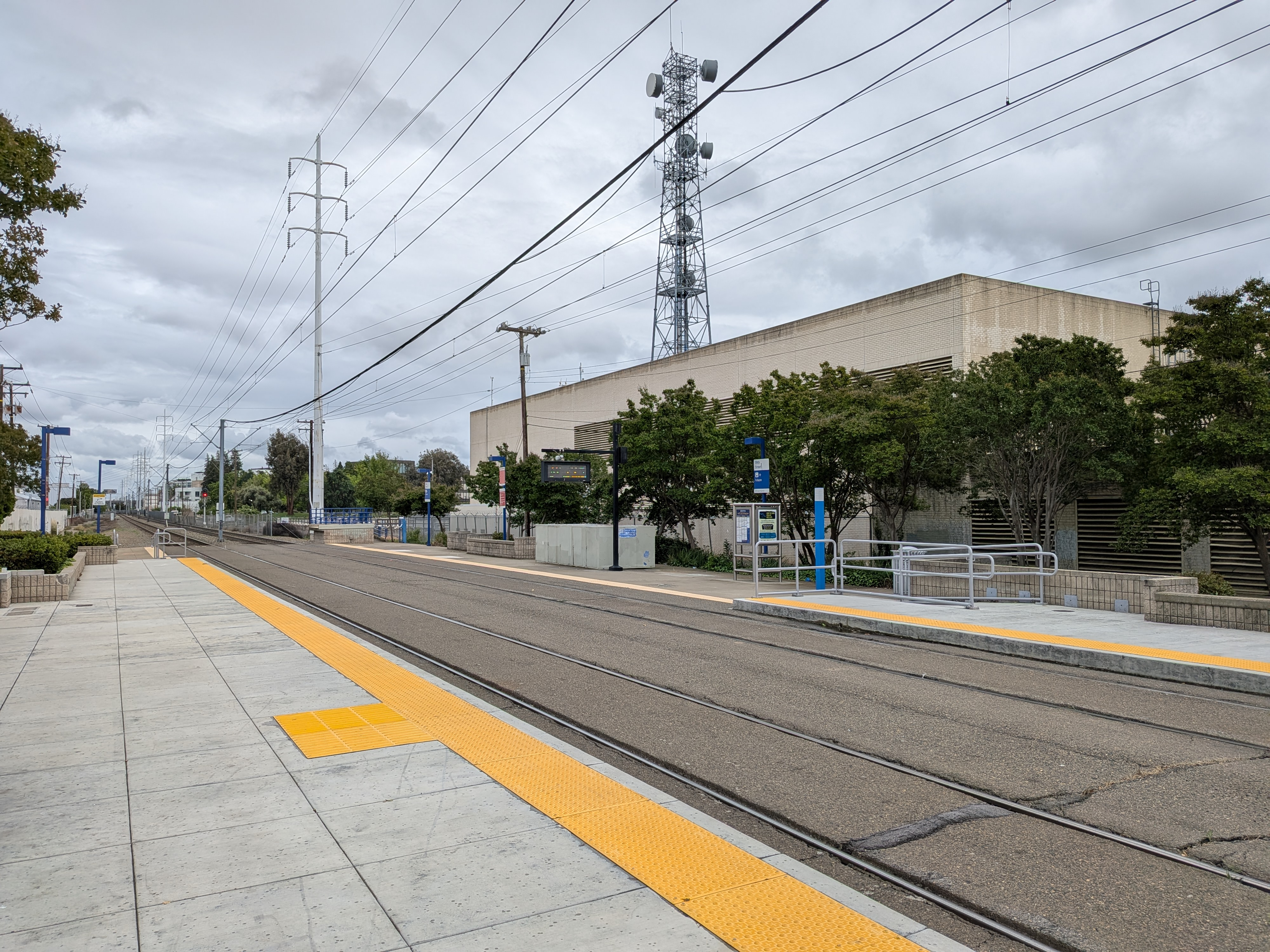
- Station in 2026

General information
- Location: 59th Street and S Street; Sacramento, California; United States
- Coordinates: 38°33′17.27″N 121°26′8.8″W
- Owner: Sacramento RT
- Platforms: 2 side platforms

Construction
- Structure type: At-grade
- Cycle facilities: Racks, lockers
- Accessible: Yes

History
- Opened: September 5, 1987; 38 years ago

Services
Preceding station	SacRT	Following station
48th Street toward Sacramento Valley Station	Gold Line	University/65th Street toward Historic Folsom
Location

59th Street is a side platformed Sacramento RT light rail station in the Fairgrounds neighborhood of Sacramento, California, United States. The station was opened on September 5, 1987, and is operated by the Sacramento Regional Transit District. It is served by the Gold Line. The station is located near the intersection of 59th Street and Highway 50.
