= 48th Street station =

Light rail station in Sacramento, California, United States

48th Street
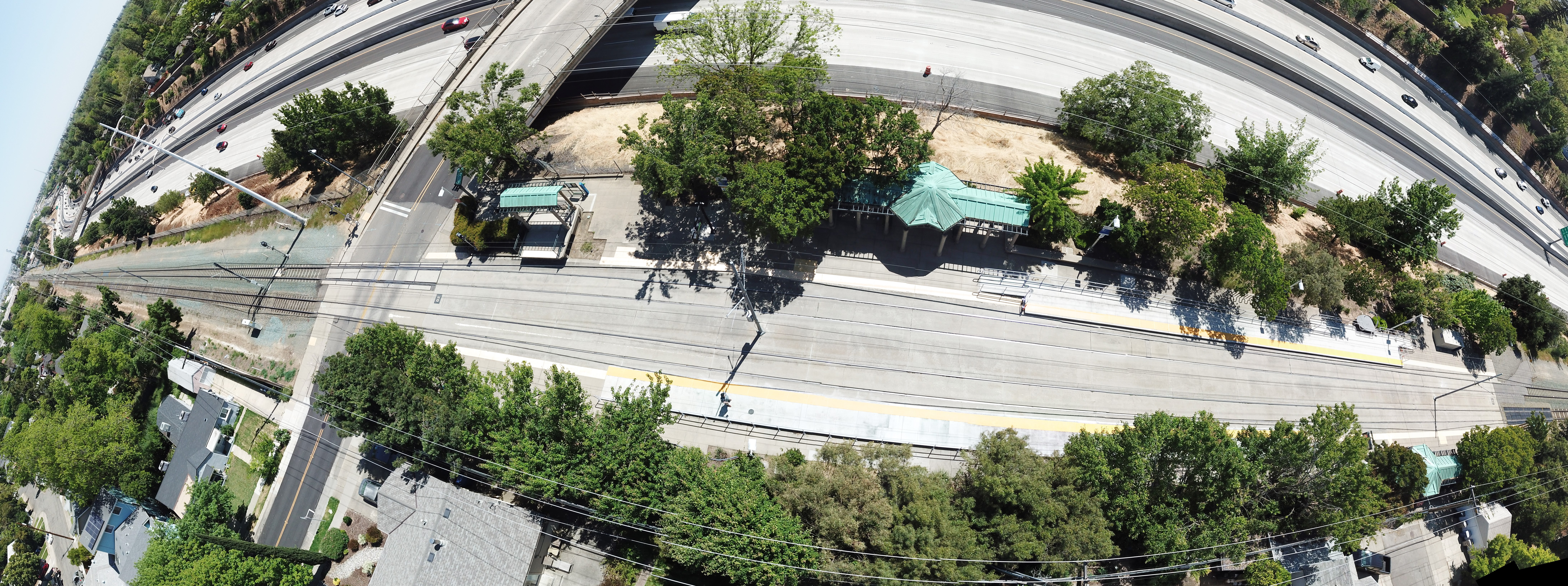
- 48th Street Light Rail station, April 2024

General information
- Location: 48th Street and Q Street; Sacramento, California; United States
- Coordinates: 38°33′30.13″N 121°26′55.48″W
- Owner: Sacramento RT
- Platforms: 2 side platforms

Construction
- Structure type: At-grade
- Cycle facilities: Racks, lockers
- Accessible: Yes

History
- Opened: July 14, 1994; 32 years ago

Services
Preceding station	SacRT	Following station
39th Street/UC Davis Health toward Sacramento Valley Station	Gold Line	59th Street toward Historic Folsom
Location

48th Street is a side platformed Sacramento RT light rail station in the Elmhurst neighborhood of Sacramento, California, United States. The station was opened on July 14, 1994, and is operated by the Sacramento Regional Transit District. It is served by the Gold Line. The station is located near the intersection of 48th Street and Highway 50.

Included originally as part of the network, both this and the 39th Street station were deferred and not constructed in 1987 due to intense neighborhood opposition. However, both would open as infill stations in July 1994 due to a shift in attitude towards the rail project following its successful opening from the surrounding neighborhoods.
