= College Greens station =

Light rail station in Sacramento, California, US

College Greens
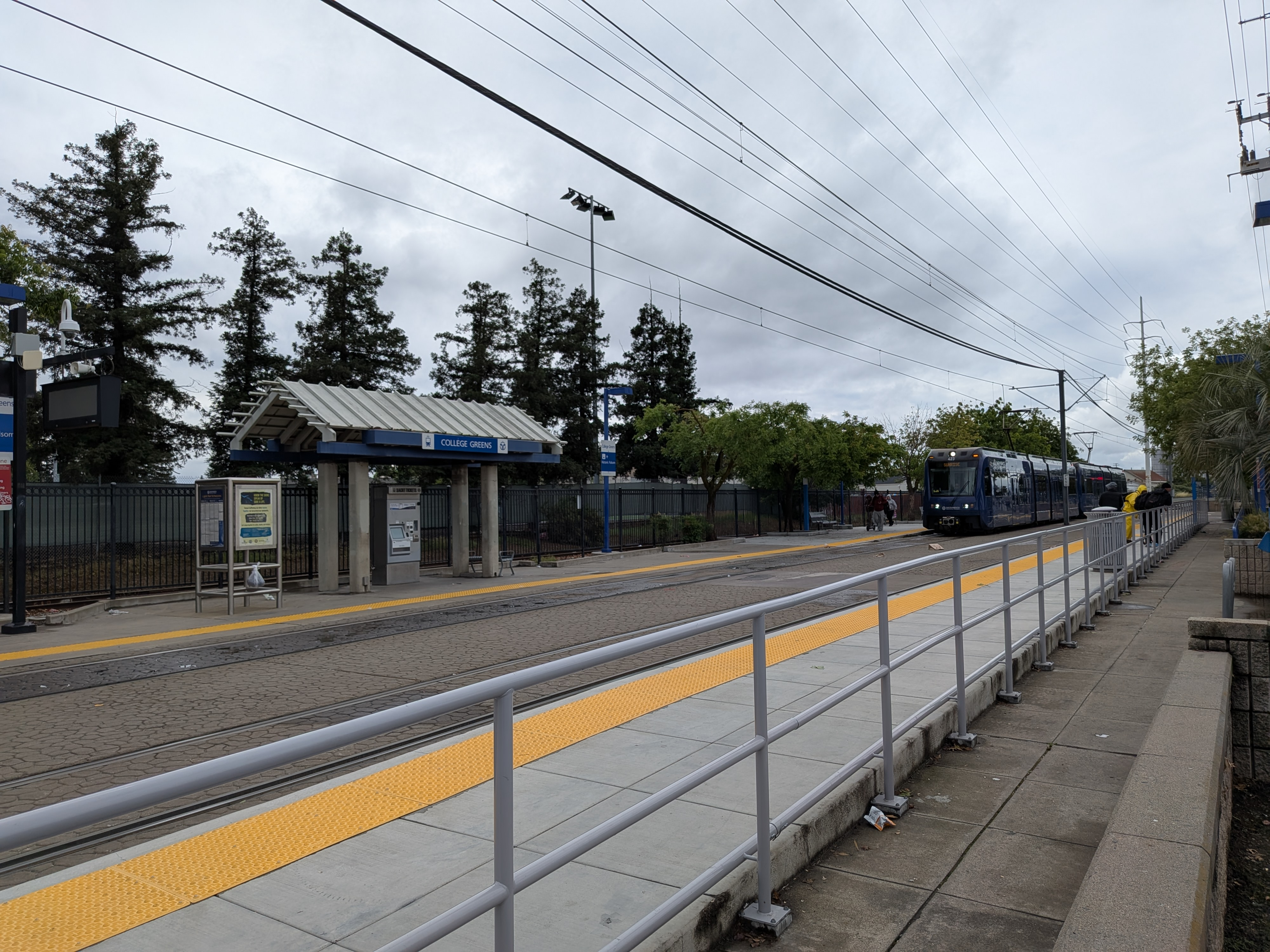
- Station platforms in 2026

General information
- Location: Folsom Boulevard and Florin Perkins Road; Sacramento, California
- Coordinates: 38°32′49.35″N 121°23′35.89″W
- Owner: Sacramento Regional Transit District
- Platforms: 2 side platforms
- Connections: Sacramento Regional Transit: 161

Construction
- Structure type: At-grade
- Cycle facilities: Racks, lockers
- Accessible: Yes

History
- Opened: September 5, 1987; 38 years ago

Services
Preceding station	SacRT	Following station
Power Inn toward Sacramento Valley Station	Gold Line	Watt/Manlove toward Historic Folsom
Location

College Greens is a side platformed Sacramento RT light rail station in the College Greens neighborhood of Sacramento, California, United States. The station was opened on September 5, 1987, and is operated by the Sacramento Regional Transit District. It is served by the Gold Line. The station is located near the intersection of Florin Perkins Road and Folsom Boulevard, in an area dominated by student housing.
