= Cordova Town Center station =

Light rail station in Rancho Cordova, California, United States

Cordova Town Center
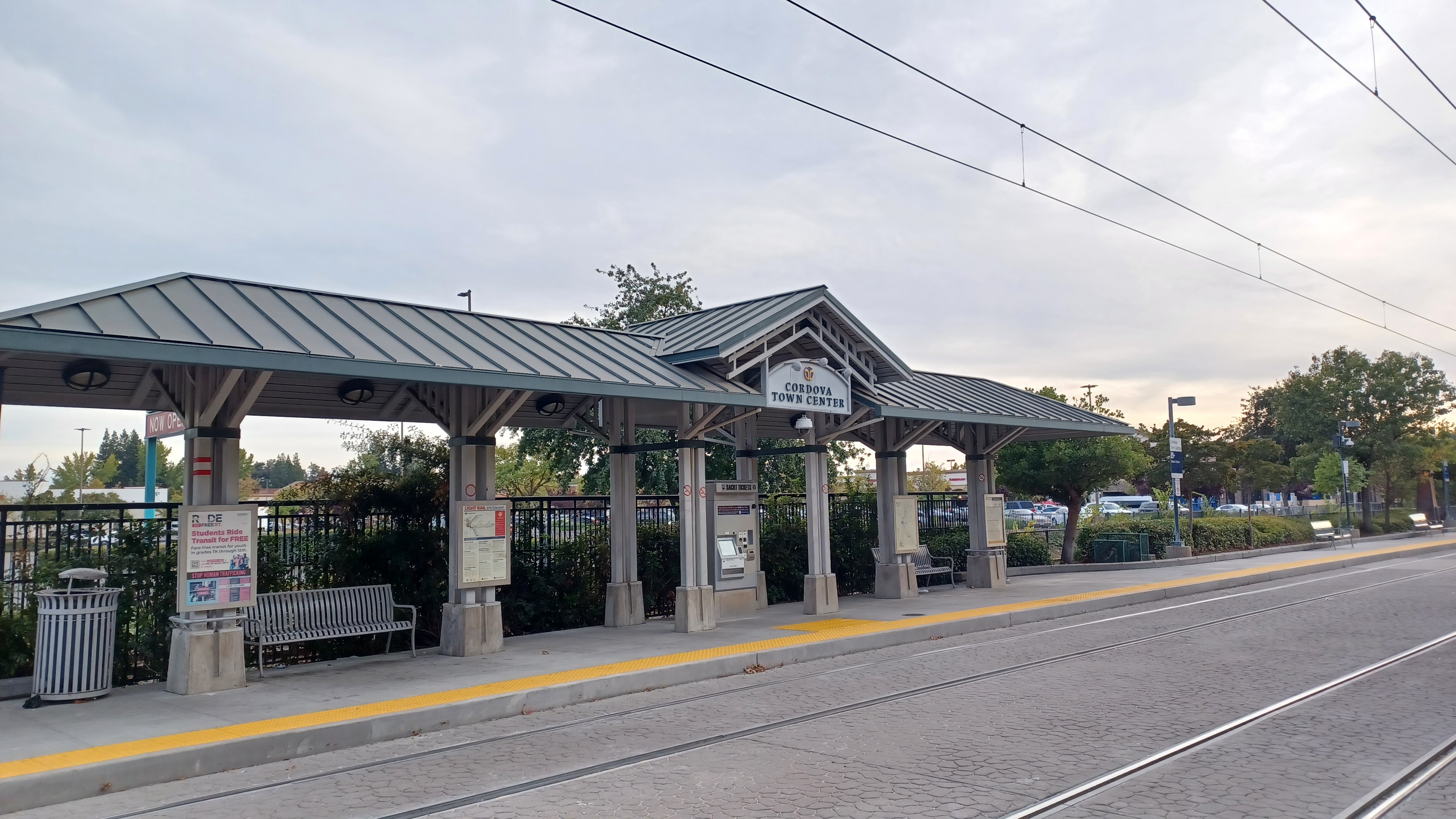
- Station platform in October 2024

General information
- Location: Folsom Boulevard and Olson Drive; Rancho Cordova, California; United States
- Coordinates: 38°35′59″N 121°16′58″W
- Owner: Sacramento Regional Transit District
- Platforms: 2 side platforms
- Tracks: 2
- Connections: Sacramento Regional Transit: SmaRT Ride Rancho Cordova

Construction
- Structure type: At-grade
- Parking: 23 spaces
- Accessible: Yes

History
- Opened: June 11, 2004; 22 years ago

Services
Preceding station	SacRT	Following station
Zinfandel toward Sacramento Valley Station	Gold Line	Sunrise toward Historic Folsom
Location

Cordova Town Center station is a side platformed SacRT light rail station in Rancho Cordova, California, United States. The station was opened on June 11, 2004, and is operated by the Sacramento Regional Transit District. It is served by the Gold Line. It is located near the intersection of Olson Drive/Cordova Lane and Folsom Boulevard and serves the nearby Rancho Cordova Town Center and a variety of shopping destinations.

Cordova Town Center, along with Zinfandel and Sunrise, opened on June 11, 2004, as part of an $89 million, 2.8-mile (4.5 km) extension of the Gold Line east of the Mather Field/Mills station. Rancho Cordova city officials have stated the establishment of the stations will help in the development of transit-oriented development/redevelopment of the Folsom corridor through the city.
