= Power Inn station =

Light rail station in Sacramento, California, United States

Power Inn
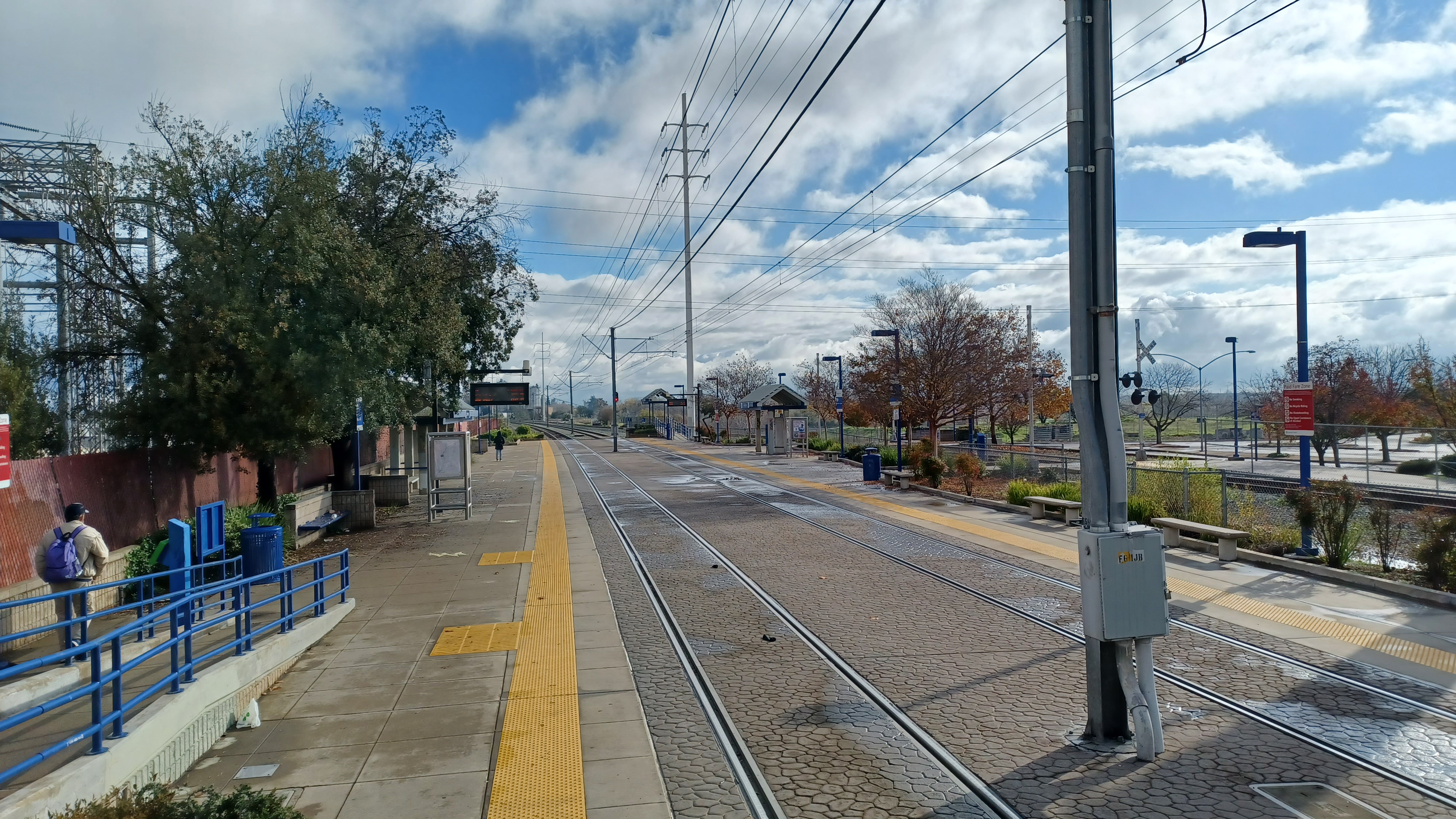
- Power Inn Station in December 2021

General information
- Location: Folsom Boulevard and Power Inn Road; Sacramento, California
- Coordinates: 38°32′50″N 121°24′27″W
- Owner: Sacramento Regional Transit District
- Platforms: 2 side platforms

Construction
- Structure type: At-grade
- Parking: 276 spaces
- Accessible: Yes

History
- Opened: September 5, 1987; 38 years ago

Services
Preceding station	SacRT	Following station
University/65th Street toward Sacramento Valley Station	Gold Line	College Greens toward Historic Folsom
Location

Power Inn is a side platformed Sacramento RT light rail station in the East Sacramento neighborhood of Sacramento, California, United States. The station was opened on September 5, 1987, and is operated by the Sacramento Regional Transit District. It is served by the Gold Line. The station is located near the intersection of Power Inn Road/Howe Avenue and Folsom Boulevard, adjacent to the U.S. 50 freeway and a major residential area, the station serves a commuter facility, via its park and ride lot.
