= Watt/Manlove station =

Light rail station in Rosemont, California, United States

Coordinates: 38°33′13″N 121°22′24″W

Watt/Manlove
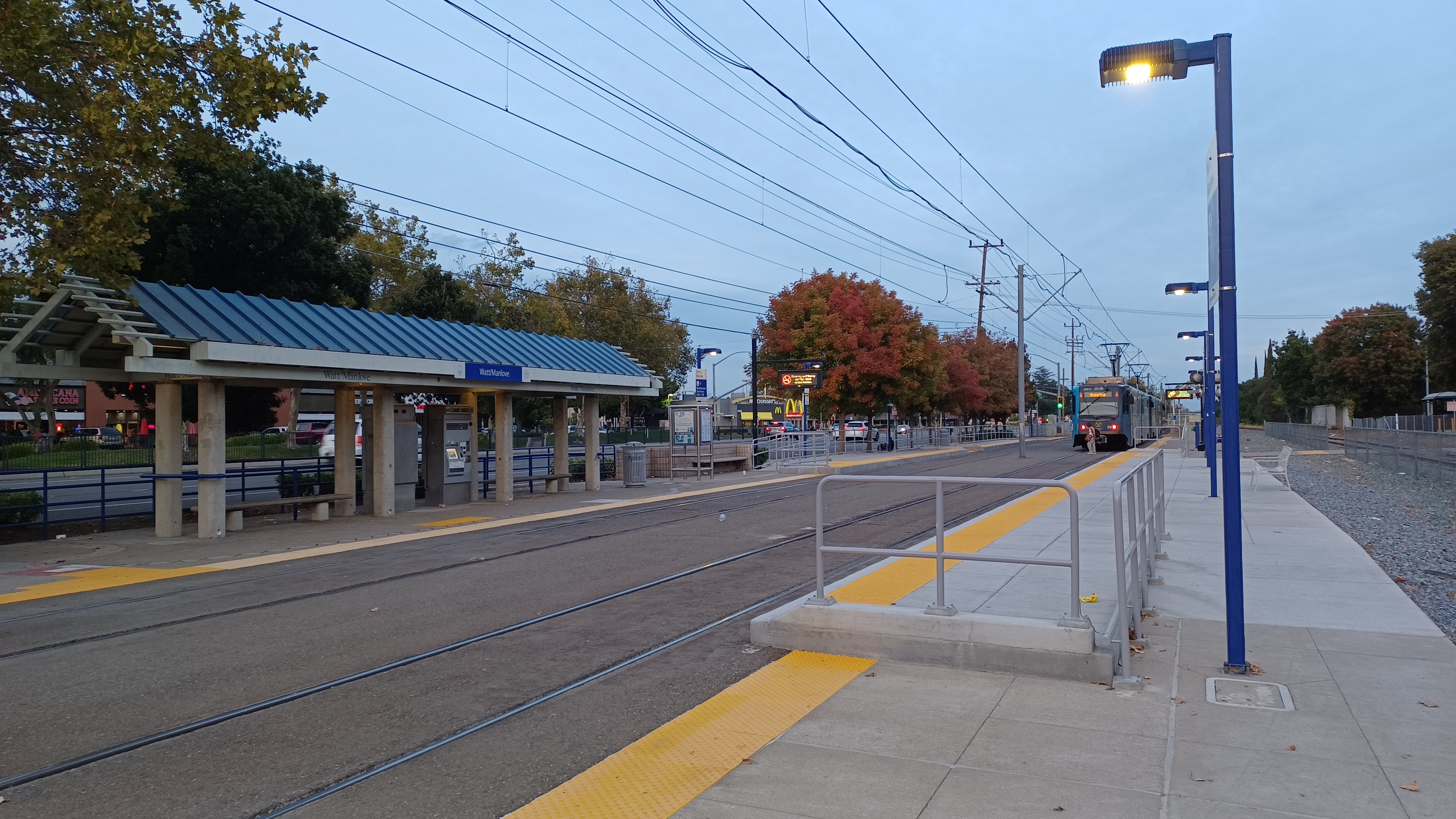
- Station platform in October 2024

General information
- Location: South Watt Avenue and Manlove Road; Rosemont, California
- Owner: Sacramento Regional Transit District
- Platforms: 2 side platforms
- Connections: Sacramento Regional Transit: 72, 84

Construction
- Structure type: At-grade
- Parking: 498 spaces
- Cycle facilities: Lockers
- Accessible: Yes

History
- Opened: September 5, 1987; 38 years ago

Services
Preceding station	SacRT	Following station
College Greens toward Sacramento Valley Station	Gold Line	Starfire toward Historic Folsom
Location

Watt/Manlove is a side platformed SacRT light rail station in Rosemont, California, United States. The station was opened on September 5, 1987, and is operated by the Sacramento Regional Transit District. It is served by the Gold Line. The station is located near the intersection of South Watt Avenue and Folsom Boulevard and serves the nearby Manlove subdivision.
