= Tiber station =

Light rail station in La Riviera, California

Tiber
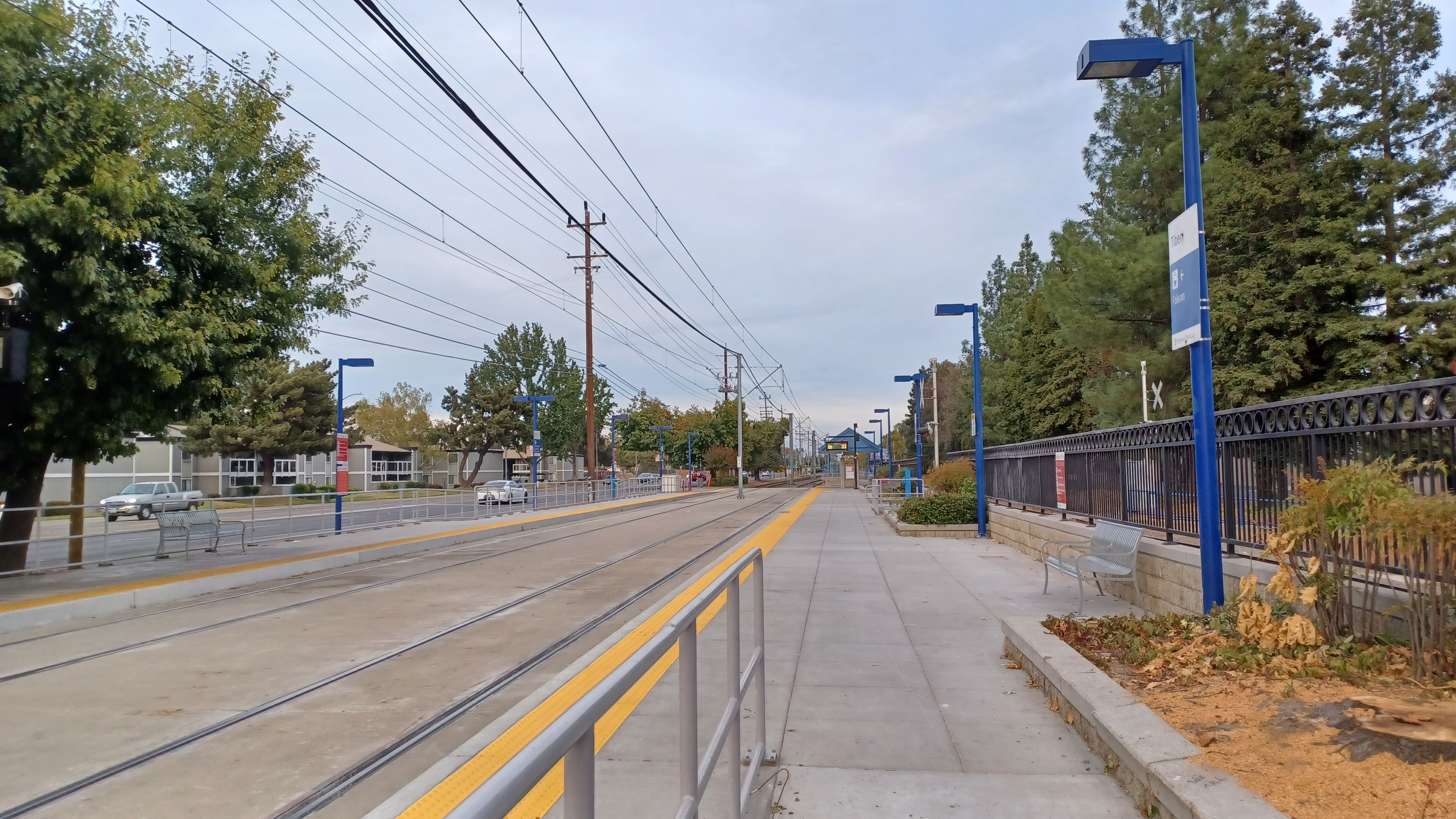
- Station platform in October 2024

General information
- Location: Folsom Boulevard and Tiber Drive; La Riviera, California; United States
- Coordinates: 38°33′50″N 121°21′11″W
- Owner: Sacramento Regional Transit District
- Platforms: 2 side platforms

Construction
- Structure type: At-grade
- Cycle facilities: Racks, lockers
- Accessible: Yes

History
- Opened: September 5, 1987; 38 years ago

Services
Preceding station	SacRT	Following station
Starfire toward Sacramento Valley Station	Gold Line	Butterfield toward Historic Folsom
Location

Tiber is a side platformed SacRT light rail station in La Riviera, California, United States. The station was opened on September 5, 1987, and is operated by the Sacramento Regional Transit District. It is served by the Gold Line. The station is located just west of Tiber Drive on Folsom Boulevard, north of Highway 50.
