= 39th Street/UC Davis Health station =

Light rail station in Sacramento, California, United States

39th Street/UC Davis Health
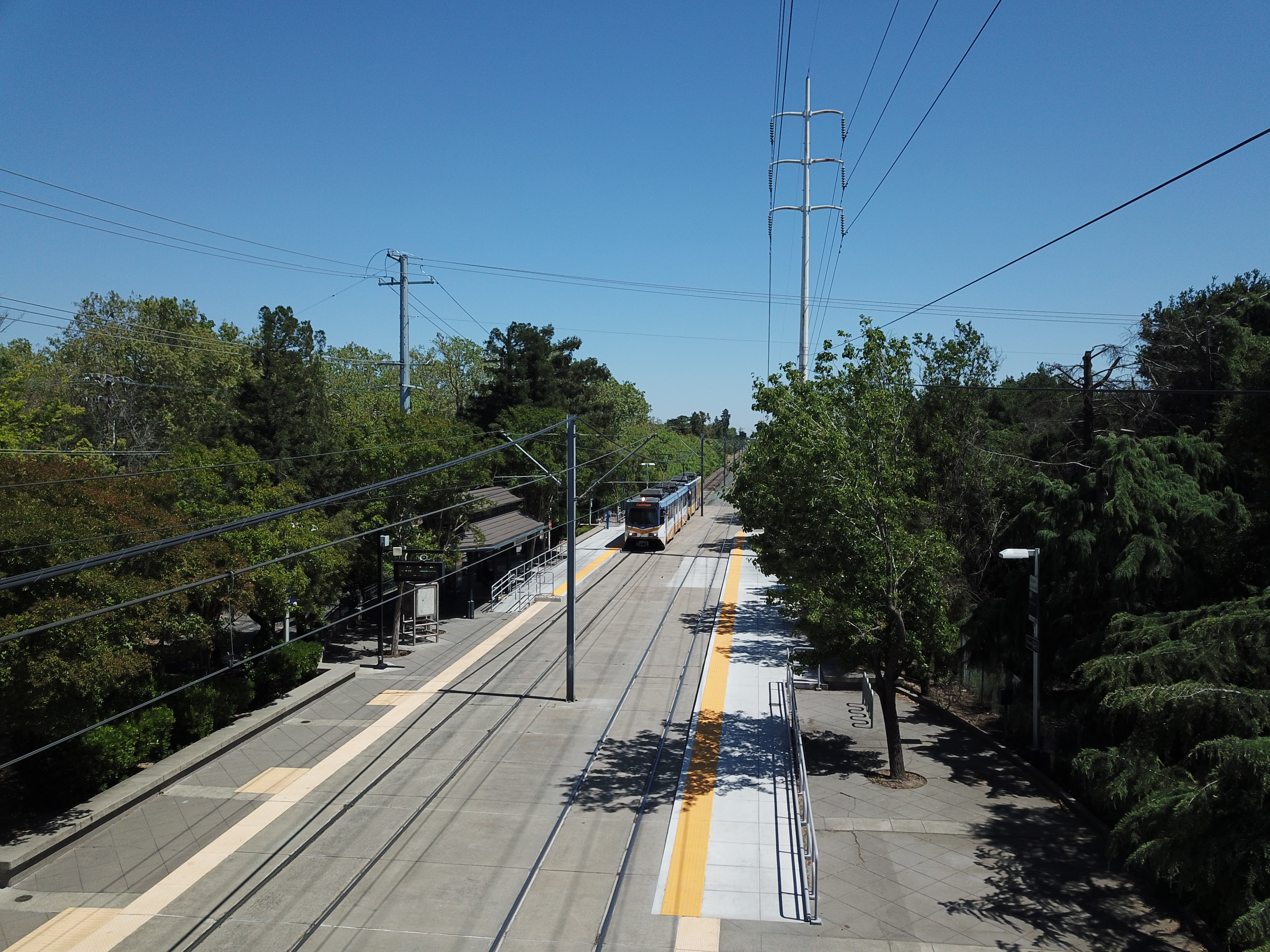
- 39th Street/UC Davis Health Light Rail station, April 2024

General information
- Location: 39th Street and R Street; Sacramento, California; United States
- Coordinates: 38°33′39″N 121°27′26″W
- Owner: Sacramento RT
- Platforms: 2 side platforms
- Connections: UC Davis Medical Center Shuttle; Mercy General Hospital Shuttle

Construction
- Structure type: At-grade
- Cycle facilities: Racks
- Accessible: Yes

History
- Opened: July 14, 1994; 32 years ago

Services
Preceding station	SacRT	Following station
29th Street toward Sacramento Valley Station	Gold Line	48th Street toward Historic Folsom
Location

39th Street/UC Davis Health is a side platformed Sacramento RT light rail station in the Elmhurst neighborhood of Sacramento, California, United States. Operated by the Sacramento Regional Transit District, the station was opened on July 14, 1994, and is served by the Gold Line. The station is located near the intersection of 39th Street and Highway 50.

Included originally as part of the network, both this and the 48th Street station were deferred and not constructed in 1987 due to intense neighborhood opposition. However, both would open as infill stations in July 1994 due to a shift in attitude towards the rail project following its successful opening from the surrounding neighborhoods.

In October 2019, RT and the UC Davis Medical Center reached an agreement to rename the station 39th Street/UC Davis Health station.
