= 29th Street station (Sacramento) =

Light rail station in Sacramento, California, United States

29th Street
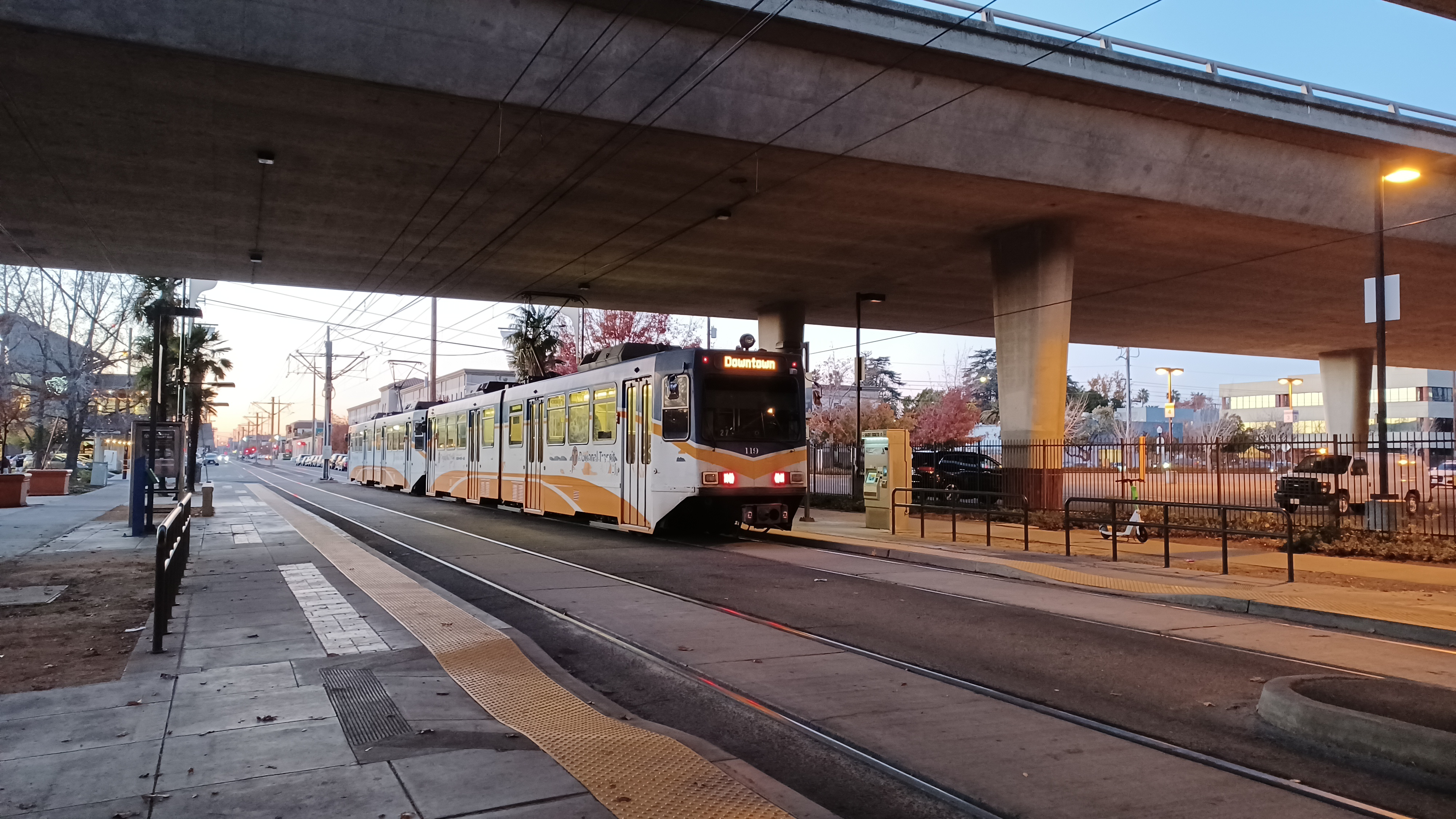
- 29th Street station under the freeway overpass

General information
- Location: 29th Street and R Street; Sacramento, California; United States
- Coordinates: 38°33′52.06″N 121°28′15.15″W
- Owner: Sacramento RT
- Platforms: 2 side platforms
- Connections: RT buses 38, 67, 68; Sutter Shuttle, Mercy General Hospital Shuttle

Construction
- Structure type: At-grade
- Cycle facilities: Racks
- Accessible: Yes

History
- Opened: September 5, 1987; 38 years ago

Services
Preceding station	SacRT	Following station
23rd Street toward Sacramento Valley Station	Gold Line	39th Street/UC Davis Health toward Historic Folsom
Location

29th Street is a side platformed Sacramento RT light rail station in the Midtown neighborhood of Sacramento, California, United States. The station was opened on September 5, 1987, and is operated by the Sacramento Regional Transit District. It is served by the Gold Line. The station is located on R Street between 29th and 30th Streets, below the overpass of Business Loop 80 (Capital City Freeway). Portions of the Poverty Ridge neighborhood are also accessible from the station.
