= Starfire station =

Light rail station in Rosemont, California, United States

Starfire
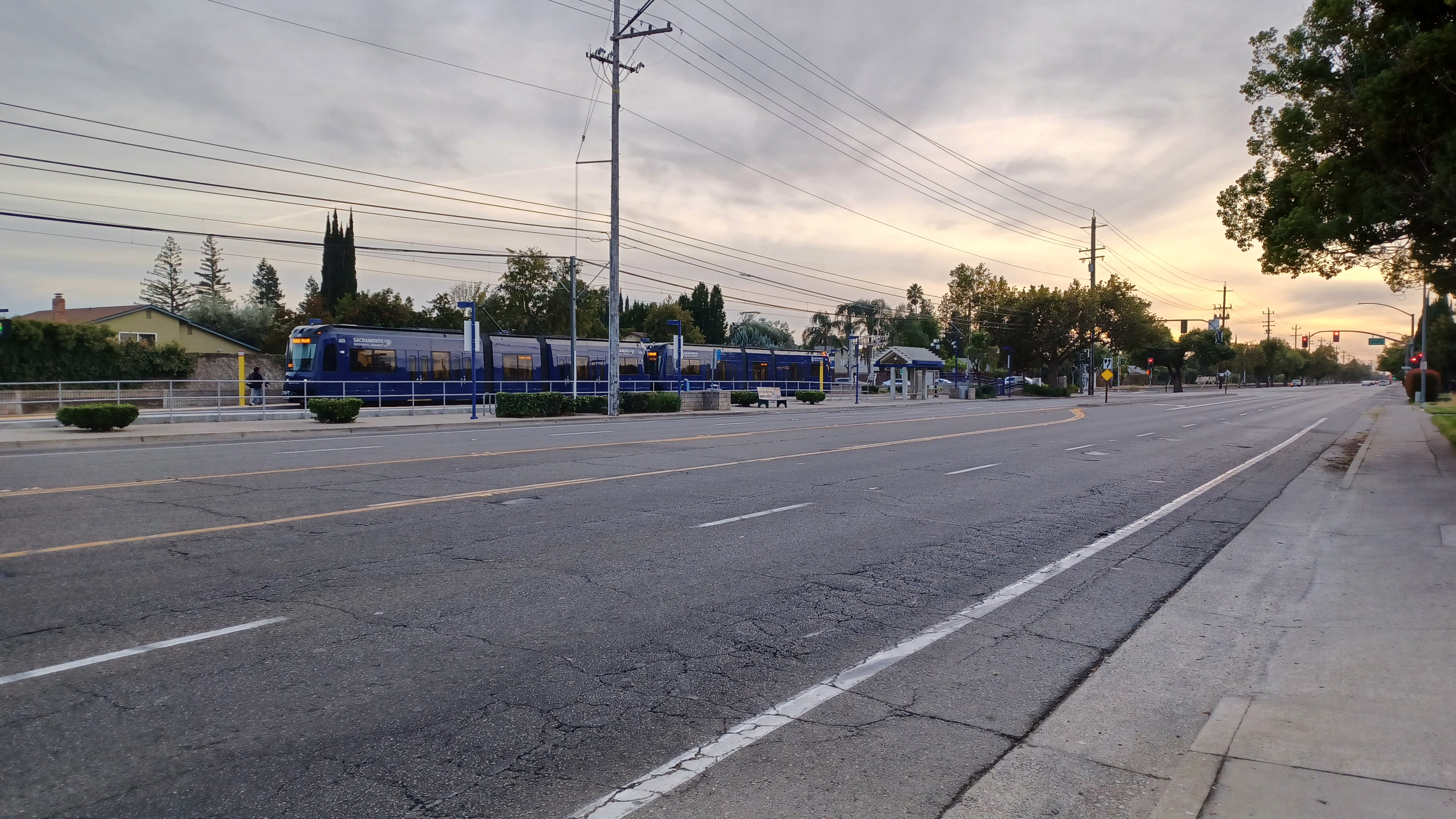
- Starfire station in October 2024

General information
- Location: Folsom Boulevard and Starfire Drive; Rosemont, California; United States
- Coordinates: 38°33′34″N 121°21′43″W
- Owner: Sacramento Regional Transit District
- Platforms: 2 side platforms
- Connections: Sacramento Regional Transit: 84

Construction
- Structure type: At-grade
- Parking: Lockers
- Accessible: Yes

History
- Opened: September 5, 1987; 38 years ago

Services
Preceding station	SacRT	Following station
Watt/Manlove toward Sacramento Valley Station	Gold Line	Tiber toward Historic Folsom
Location

Starfire is a side platformed Sacramento RT light rail station in Rosemont, California, United States. The station was opened on September 5, 1987, and is operated by the Sacramento Regional Transit District.

It is served by the Gold Line. The station is located near the intersection of Starfire Drive on Folsom Boulevard, south of Highway 50.
