= University/65th Street station =

Light rail station in Sacramento, California, United States

University/65th Street
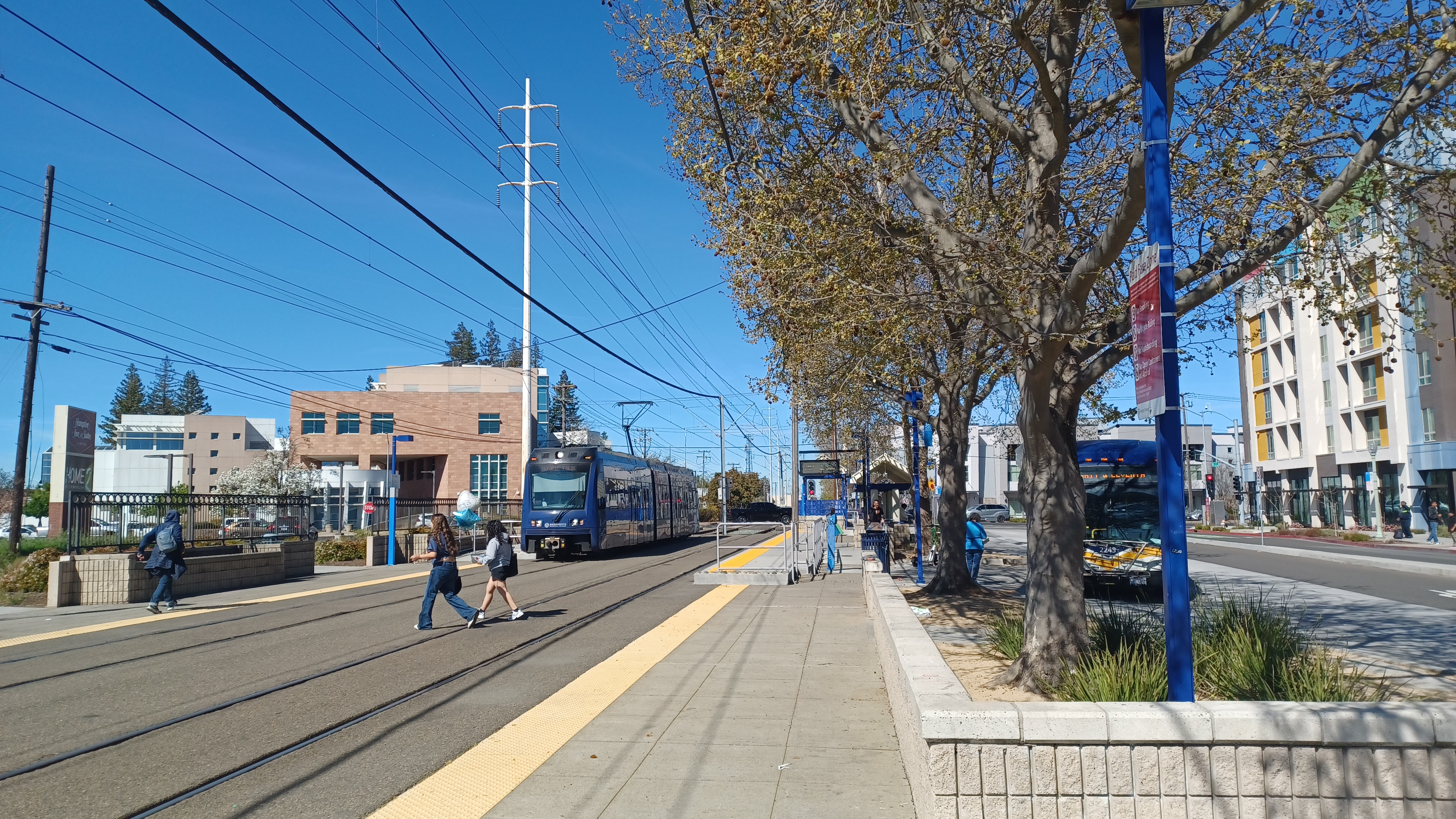
- Looking west at the station in March 2025

General information
- Location: 65th Street and Q Street; Sacramento, California; United States
- Coordinates: 38°33′09″N 121°25′38″W
- Owner: Sacramento Regional Transit District
- Platforms: 2 side platforms
- Tracks: 2
- Connections: Sacramento Regional Transit: 26, 38, 81, 82, 87, SmaRT Ride Downtown–Midtown–East Sacramento; Amador Transit: 1; El Dorado Transit: Sacramento Commuter; Hornet Shuttle

Construction
- Structure type: At-grade
- Accessible: Yes

History
- Opened: September 5, 1987; 38 years ago

Services
| Preceding station | SacRT | Following station |
|---|---|---|
| 59th Street toward Sacramento Valley Station | Gold Line | Power Inn toward Historic Folsom |
Location

University/65th Street station is a side platformed Sacramento RT light rail station in Sacramento, California, United States. The station was opened on September 5, 1987, is operated by the Sacramento Regional Transit District and is the closest station to California State University, Sacramento. It is served by the Gold Line. The station is located at the intersection of 65th Street and Q Street.
