= Mather Field/Mills station =

SacRT light rail station

Mather Field/Mills
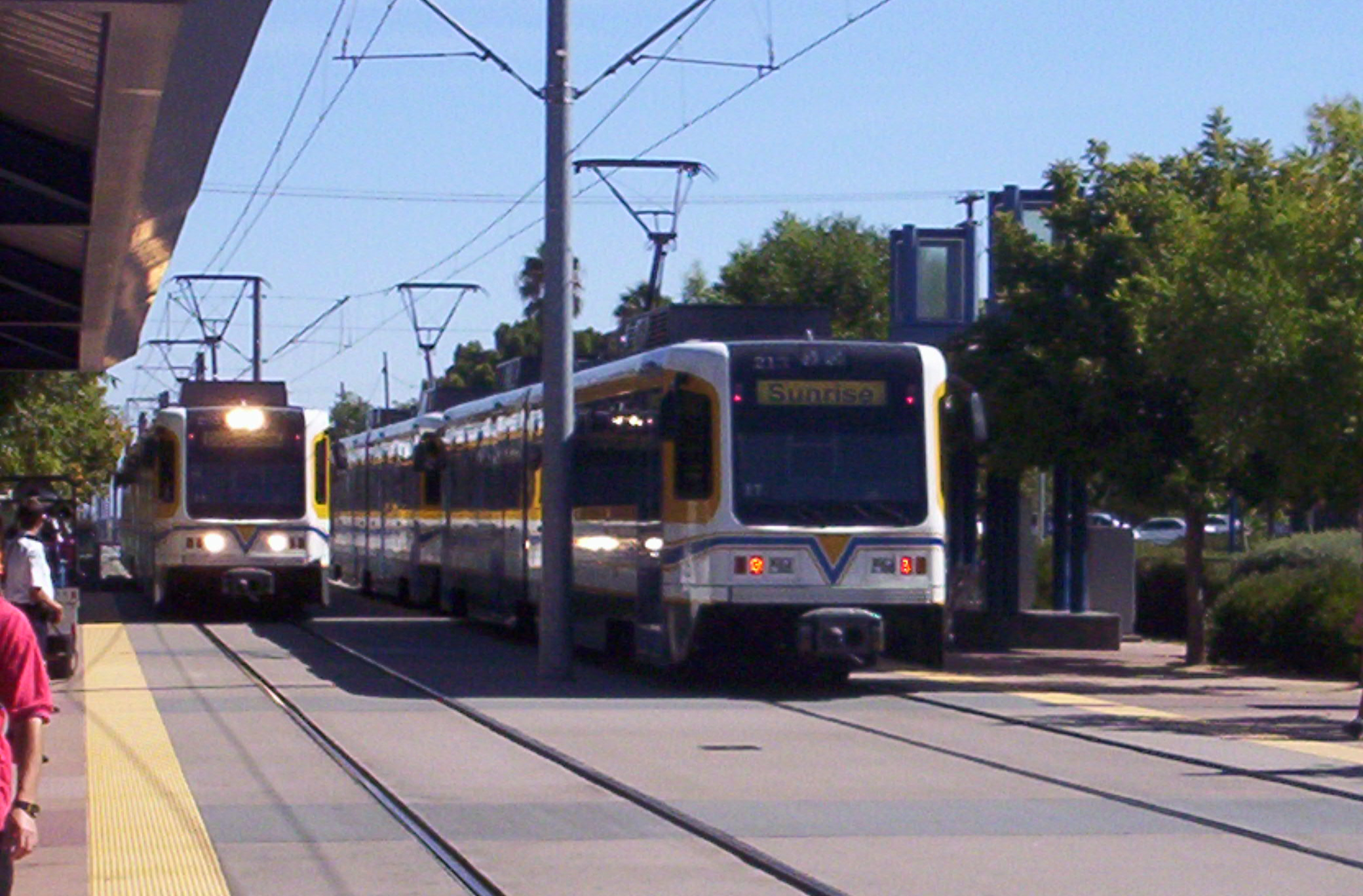
- Mather Field/Mills station platforms

General information
- Location: Folsom Boulevard and Mather Field Road; Rancho Cordova, California; United States
- Coordinates: 38°35′05″N 121°18′40″W
- Owner: Sacramento Regional Transit District
- Platforms: 2 side platforms
- Tracks: 2
- Connections: Sacramento Regional Transit: 21, 72, 75, 78, SmaRT Ride Rancho Cordova

Construction
- Structure type: At-grade
- Parking: 235 spaces
- Cycle facilities: Lockers
- Accessible: Yes

History
- Opened: September 6, 1998; 27 years ago

Services
Preceding station	SacRT	Following station
Butterfield toward Sacramento Valley Station	Gold Line	Zinfandel toward Historic Folsom
Location

Mather Field/Mills station is a side platformed SacRT light rail station in Rancho Cordova, California, United States. The station was opened on September 6, 1998, and is operated by the Sacramento Regional Transit District. It is served by the Gold Line. The station is located near the intersection of Mather Field Road and Folsom Boulevard, is served by various RT bus routes, and serves the nearby Mather Field and the nearby Mills Shopping Center.

When the station opened in 1998, it replaced Butterfield as the eastern terminus of what was then the original RT light rail alignment (Watt/I-80–Downtown–Butterfield line) and was the first extension to the original network. It would remain the terminus through June 11, 2004, when the line was extended to Sunrise and eventually all the way to Folsom.

== Deaths ==
A teenage girl, 15-year-old Mariah Burgess, was struck and killed on November 13, 2014, just north of the tracks. She was hit using the crossway located at the intersection of Folsom Boulevard and Coloma Road, just east of the station. According to a spokesperson for Regional Transit, Alane Masui, witnesses to the incident reported that "Burgess walked into the path of the eastbound train" and "witness accounts and surveillance video indicated that warning lights were activated an dthe train operator sounded the horn...the girl appeared to be using headphones and may have been distracted."

A bicyclist was killed at the Mather Field/Mills station on November 18, 2014.
