= Hazel station =

SacRT light rail station

Hazel
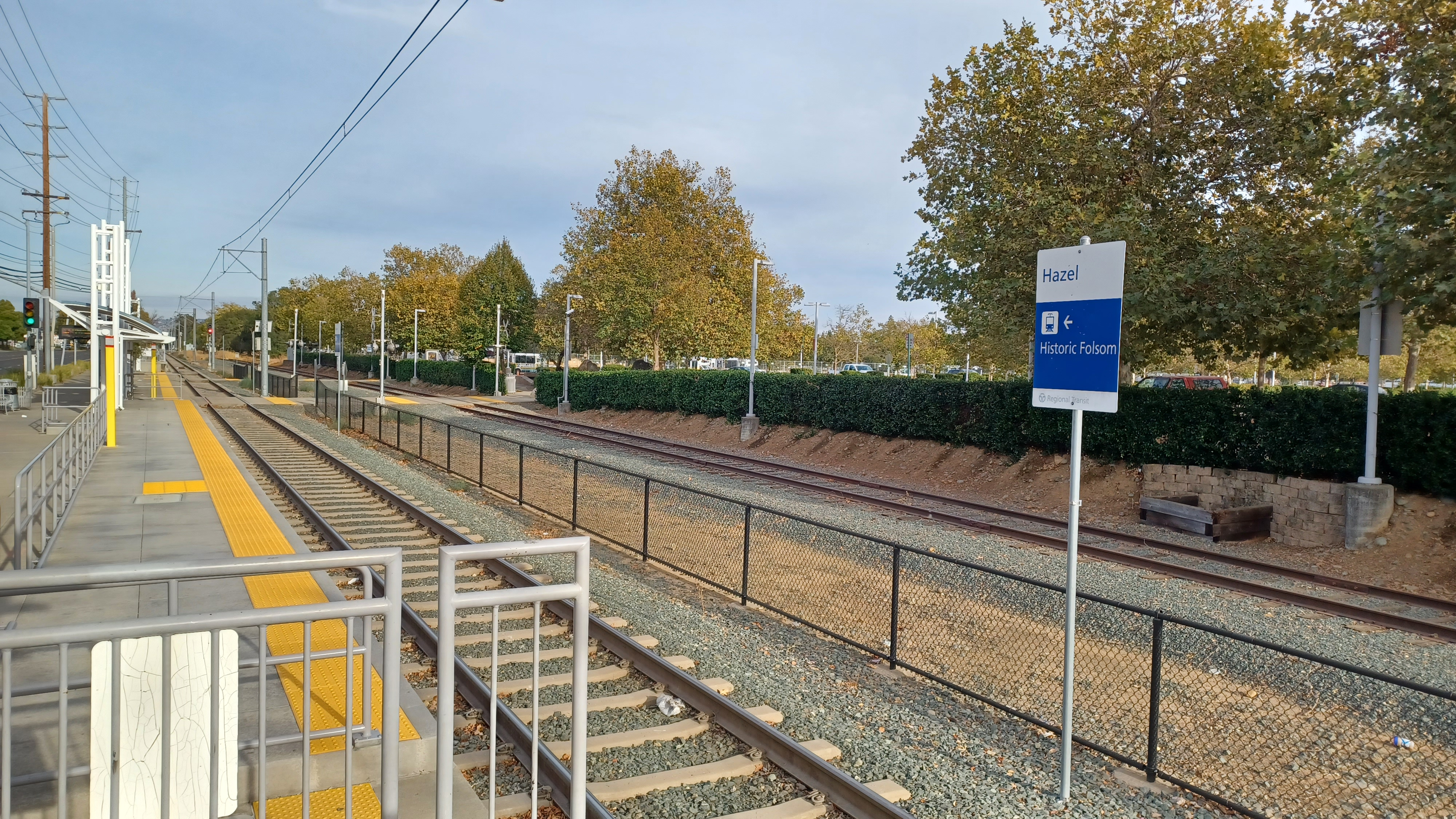
- Hazel station platform in October 2024

General information
- Location: Folsom Boulevard at Hazel Avenue; Rancho Cordova, California; United States
- Coordinates: 38°37′49″N 121°12′44″W
- Owner: Sacramento Regional Transit District
- Platforms: 1 side platform
- Tracks: 2

Construction
- Structure type: At-grade
- Parking: 432 spaces
- Cycle facilities: Lockers
- Accessible: Yes

History
- Opened: October 15, 2005; 20 years ago

Services
Preceding station	SacRT	Following station
Sunrise toward Sacramento Valley Station	Gold Line	Iron Point toward Historic Folsom
Location

Hazel station is a single side platform SacRT light rail station located in unincorporated Sacramento County, California, just outside of the city limits of Rancho Cordova and Folsom, as well as the census-designated place of Gold River. The station opened on October 15, 2005, and is operated by the Sacramento Regional Transit District, being served by the Gold Line. The station is located on Folsom Boulevard near its intersection with Hazel Avenue, for which the station is named. The station is located adjacent to the Aerojet Rocketdyne plant.
