= Zinfandel station =

Light rail station in Rancho Cordova, California, United States

Zinfandel
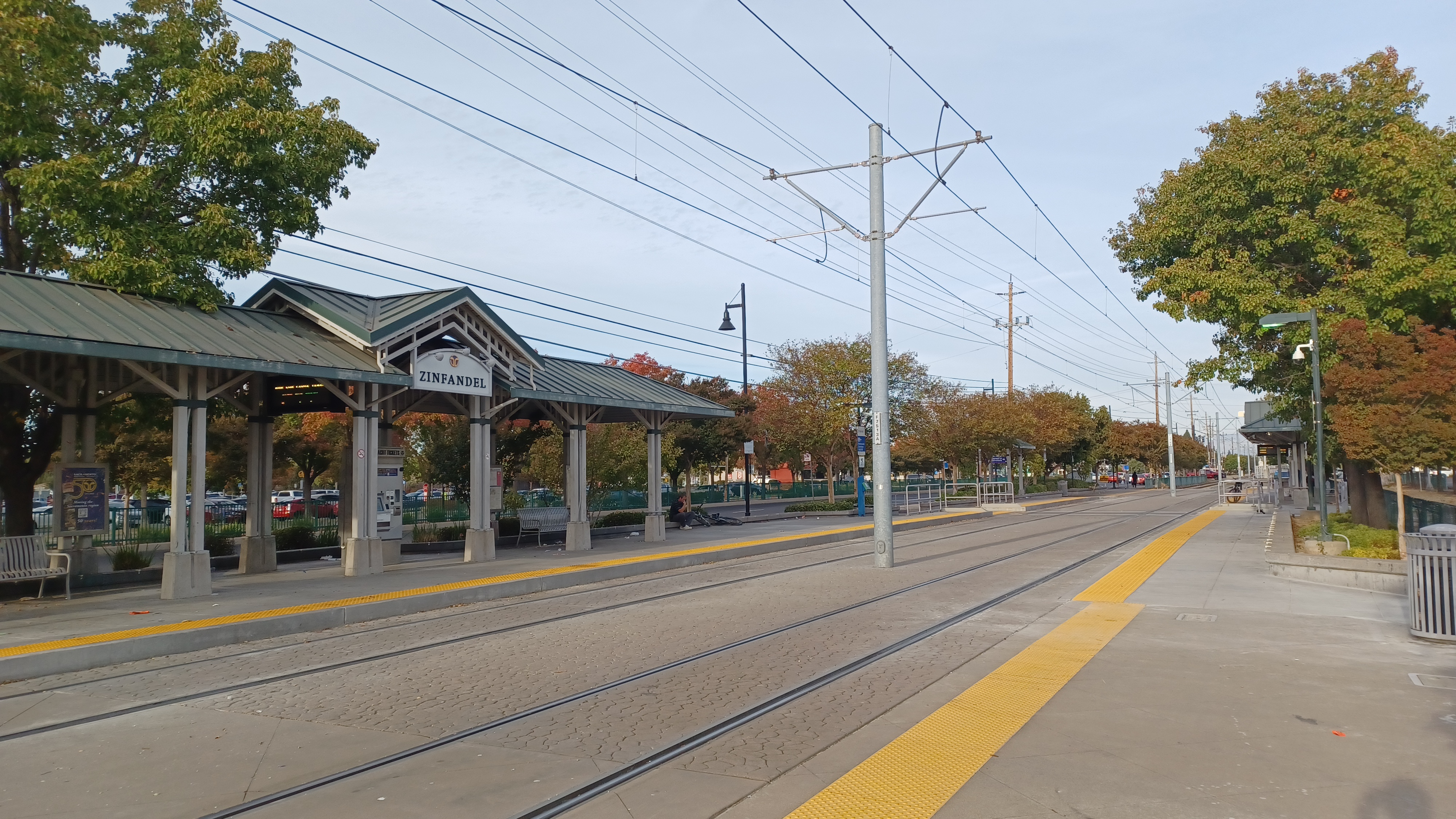
- Station platform, October 2024

General information
- Location: Folsom Boulevard and Zinfandel Drive; Rancho Cordova, California; United States
- Coordinates: 38°35′42″N 121°17′25″W
- Owner: Sacramento Regional Transit District
- Platforms: 2 side platforms
- Tracks: 2
- Connections: Sacramento Regional Transit: 175, 176, 177, SmaRT Ride Rancho Cordova

Construction
- Structure type: At-grade
- Accessible: Yes

History
- Opened: June 11, 2004; 22 years ago

Services
Preceding station	SacRT	Following station
Mather Field/Mills toward Sacramento Valley Station	Gold Line	Cordova Town Center toward Historic Folsom
Location

Zinfandel station is a side platformed SacRT light rail station in Rancho Cordova, California, United States. The station was opened on June 11, 2004, and is operated by the Sacramento Regional Transit District. It is served by the Gold Line. Across the street from the stop is the Rancho Cordova Town Center mall.

The station was originally intended for construction along Folsom, east of Zinfandel Drive. However, RT officials moved the station west of Zinfandel after requests by the Rancho Cordova Area Chamber of Commerce due to the better location adjacent to retail centers. Zinfandel, along with Cordova Town Center and Sunrise, opened on June 11, 2004, as part of an $89 million, 2.8-mile (4.5 km) extension of the Gold Line east of the Mather Field/Mills station. Rancho Cordova city officials have stated the establishment of the stations will help in the development of transit-oriented development/redevelopment of the Folsom corridor through the city.
