= Iron Point station =

SacRT light rail station

Iron Point
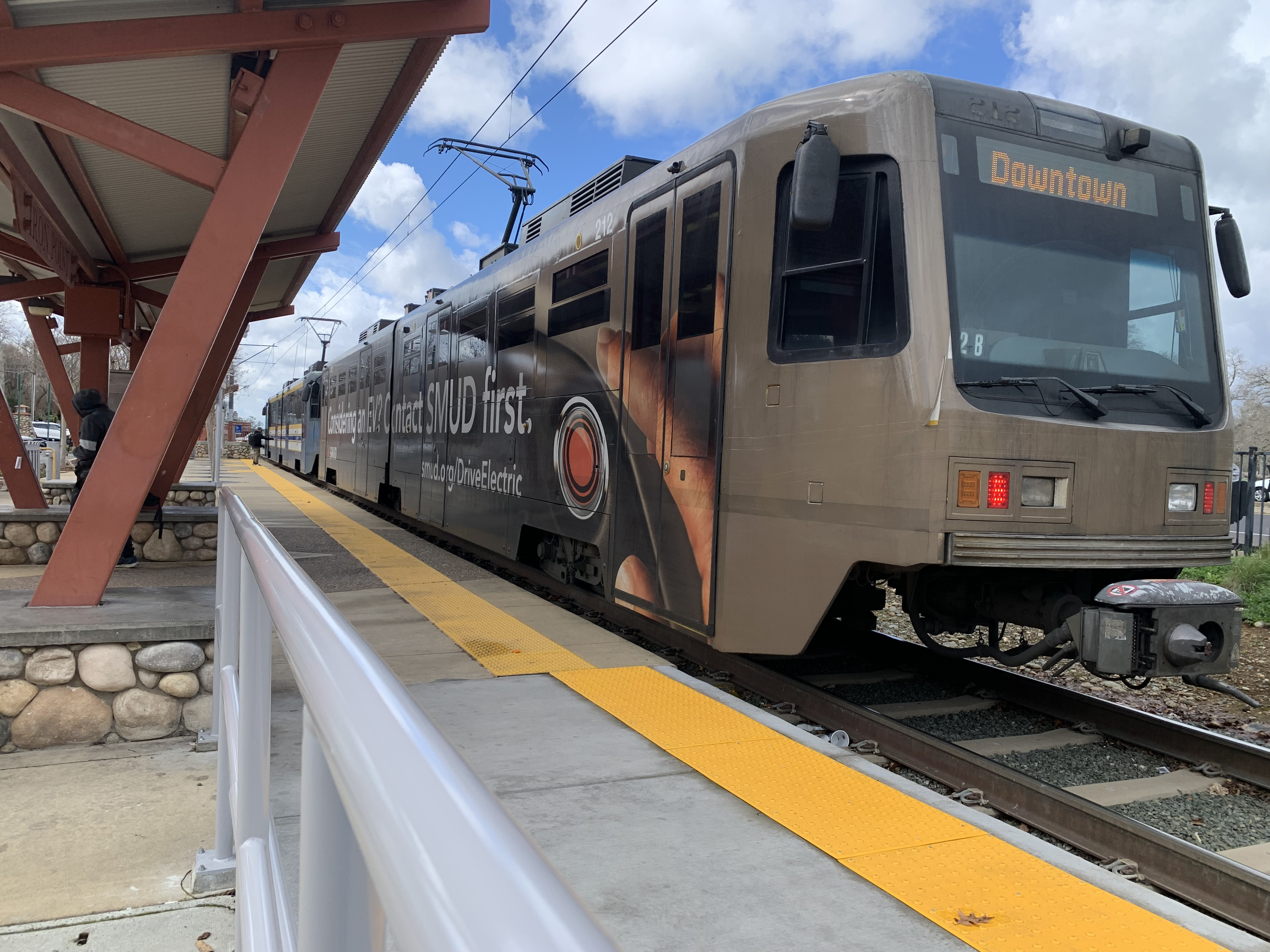
- SacRT Gold Line trainset at Iron Point Station

General information
- Location: Folsom Boulevard and Iron Point Road; Folsom, California; United States
- Coordinates: 38°38′41″N 121°11′25″W
- Owner: Sacramento Regional Transit District
- Platforms: 1 side platform
- Tracks: 1
- Connections: Sacramento Regional Transit: F10, SmaRT Ride Folsom; El Dorado Transit: 50 Express

Construction
- Structure type: At-grade
- Parking: 216 spaces
- Cycle facilities: Racks, lockers
- Accessible: Yes

History
- Opened: October 15, 2005; 20 years ago

Services
Preceding station	SacRT	Following station
Hazel toward Sacramento Valley Station	Gold Line	Glenn toward Historic Folsom
Location

Iron Point station is a side platformed SacRT light rail station in Folsom, California, United States. The station was opened on October 15, 2005, and is operated by the Sacramento Regional Transit District. It is served by the Gold Line. The station is located near the intersection of Folsom Boulevard and Iron Point Road, for which the station is named, and serves the Folsom Premium Outlets shopping center.
