= Butterfield station =

Tram stop in La Riviera, California, United States

Butterfield
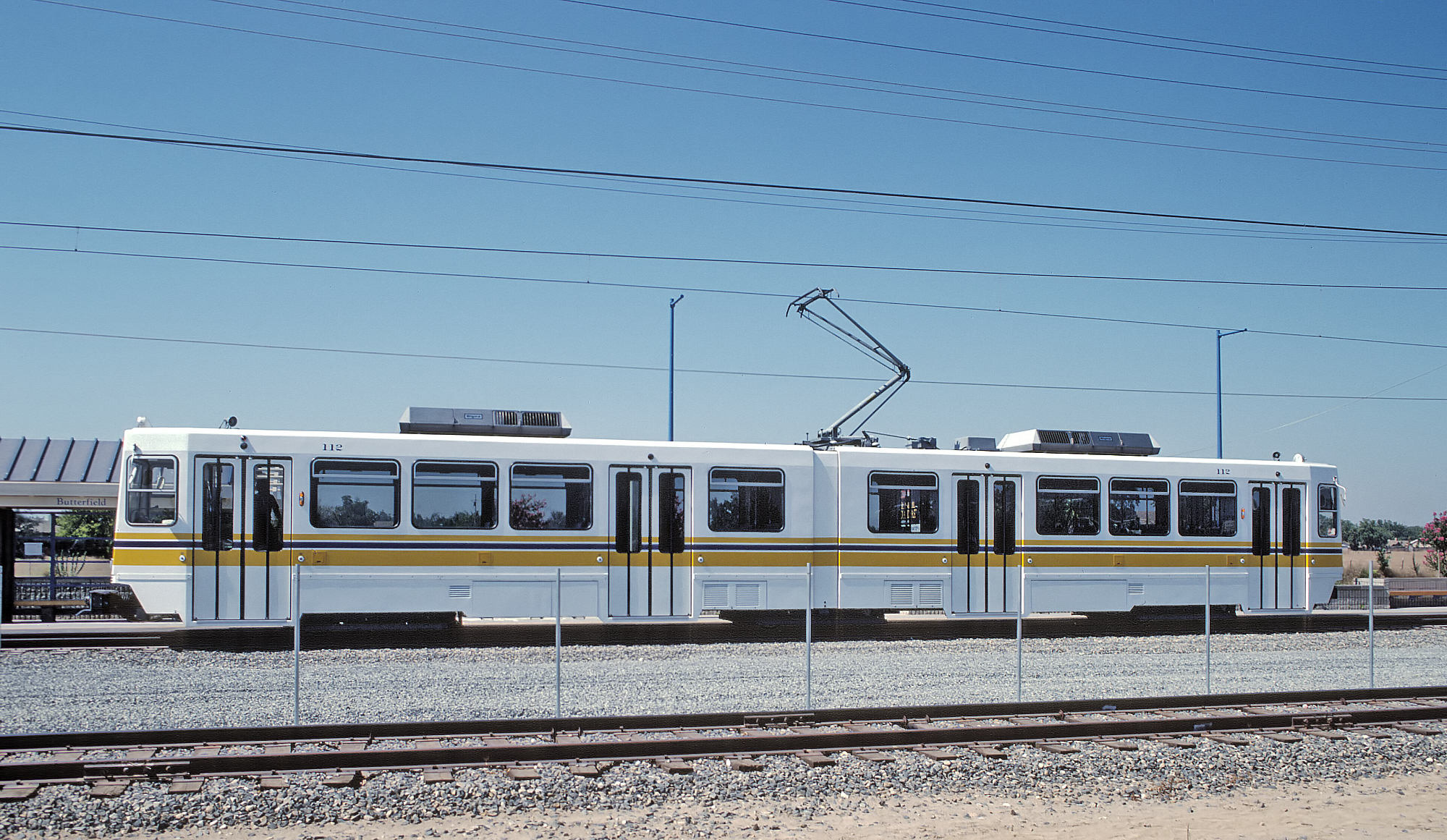
- A light rail vehicle at Butterfield station in August 1988, one year after the line's opening

General information
- Location: Folsom Boulevard and Butterfield Way; La Riviera, California; United States
- Coordinates: 38°34′02″N 121°20′48″W
- Owner: Sacramento Regional Transit District
- Platforms: 2 side platforms
- Tracks: 2
- Connections: Sacramento Regional Transit: 78, E19

Construction
- Structure type: At-grade
- Parking: 406 spaces
- Cycle facilities: Lockers
- Accessible: Yes

History
- Opened: September 5, 1987; 39 years ago

Services
Preceding station	SacRT	Following station
Tiber toward Sacramento Valley Station	Gold Line	Mather Field/Mills toward Historic Folsom
Location

Butterfield station is a side platformed SacRT light rail station in La Riviera, California, United States. The station was opened on September 5, 1987, and is operated by the Sacramento Regional Transit District. It is served by the Gold Line. The station is located at the intersection of Folsom Boulevard and Butterfield Way just northeast of Highway 50. From its opening through the opening of the Mather Field/Mills station on September 6, 1998, this served as the eastern terminus of the original RT light rail alignment (the Watt/I-80–Downtown–Butterfield line).

A large office for the California Franchise Tax Board was built next to the station.
