= Sunrise station =

Light rail station in Rancho Cordova, California, United States

Sunrise
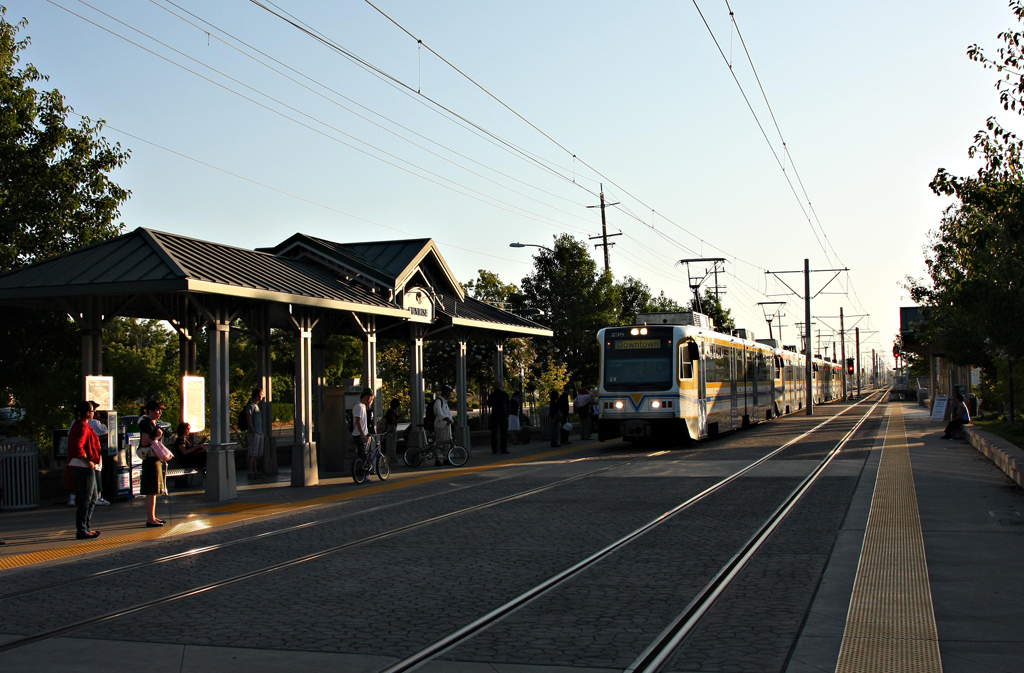
- Sunrise station platforms

General information
- Location: Folsom Boulevard and Sunrise Boulevard; Rancho Cordova, California; United States
- Coordinates: 38°36′24″N 121°16′00″W
- Owner: Sacramento Regional Transit District
- Platforms: 2 side platforms
- Tracks: 2
- Connections: Sacramento Regional Transit: 124, SmaRT Ride Folsom

Construction
- Structure type: Elevated embankment
- Parking: 487 spaces
- Cycle facilities: Racks, lockers
- Accessible: Yes

History
- Opened: June 11, 2004; 22 years ago

Services
Preceding station	SacRT	Following station
Cordova Town Center toward Sacramento Valley Station	Gold Line	Hazel toward Historic Folsom
Location

Sunrise station is a side-platformed SacRT light rail station in Rancho Cordova, California, United States. The station was opened on June 11, 2004, and is operated by the Sacramento Regional Transit District. It is served by the Gold Line. The station is located on Folsom Boulevard just south of Highway 50 at the intersection of Sunrise Boulevard.

Sunrise, along with Zinfandel and Cordova Town Center, opened on June 11, 2004, as part of an $89 million, 2.8-mile (4.5 km) extension of what was then the original Watt/I-80–Downtown–Mather Field/Mills line east of the Mather Field/Mills station. Sunrise served as the eastern terminus for what was then the newly created Downtown–Sunrise line (now Gold Line) until the extension to Historic Folsom opened on October 15, 2005. Rancho Cordova city officials have stated the establishment of the stations will help in the development of transit-oriented development/redevelopment of the Folsom corridor through the city.

Sunrise serves as the eastern terminus of the Gold Line for short-turn trains.
