= Glenn station =

Light rail station in Folsom, California, United States

Glenn/Robert G Holderness
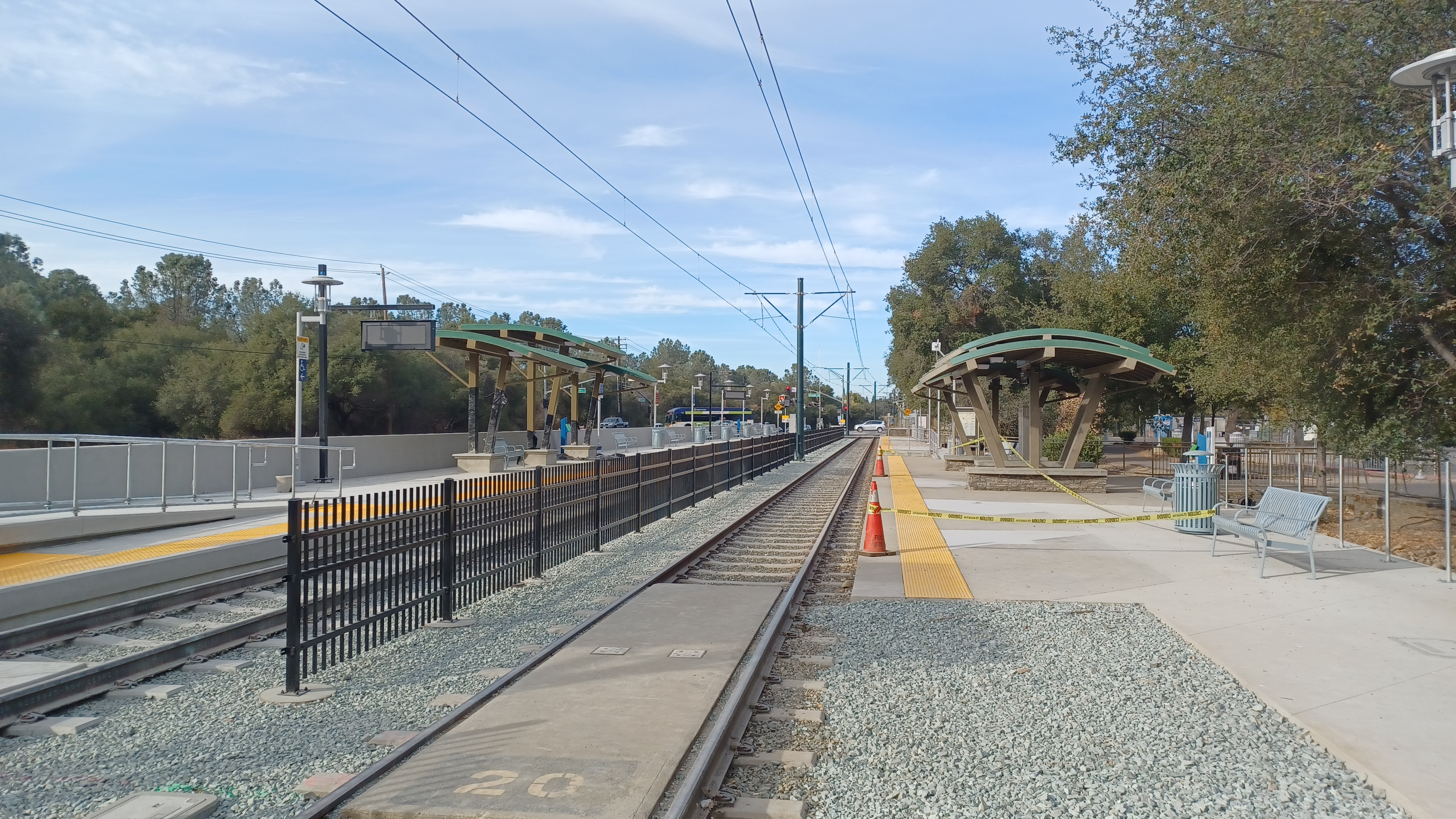
- Glenn station, October 2024

General information
- Location: Folsom Boulevard and Glenn Drive; Folsom, California; United States
- Coordinates: 38°39′47″N 121°11′01″W
- Owner: Sacramento Regional Transit District
- Platforms: 2 side platform
- Tracks: 2
- Connections: Sacramento Regional Transit: SmaRT Ride Folsom

Construction
- Structure type: At-grade
- Parking: 165 spaces
- Cycle facilities: Lockers
- Accessible: Yes

History
- Opened: October 15, 2005; 21 years ago

Services
| Preceding station | SacRT | Following station |
|---|---|---|
| Iron Point toward Sacramento Valley Station | Gold Line | Historic Folsom Terminus |
Location

Glenn station (also known as Glenn/Robert G Holderness station) is a side platformed SacRT light rail station in Folsom, California, United States. The station was opened on October 15, 2005, and is operated by the Sacramento Regional Transit District. It is served by the Gold Line. The station is located near the intersection of Glenn Drive and Folsom Boulevard. It serves primarily as a commuter stop, as it features a mid-sized parking lot.

In January 2024, Sacramento Regional Transit began construction to add a second track to the station to allow increased service frequency to Historic Folsom station. The construction was completed in January 2025.

The station is named after Robert G. Holderness, the former mayor of Folsom.
