= Rosemont, California =

Rosemont
- census-designated place
- Interactive map of Rosemont
- Location in California Location in the United States
- Coordinates: 38°32′58″N 121°21′22″W
- Country: United States
- State: California
- County: Sacramento

Area
  - Total: 4.387 sq mi (11.36 km^{2})
  - Land: 4.387 sq mi (11.36 km^{2})
  - Water: 0 sq mi (0 km^{2}) 0%
- Elevation: 49 ft (15 m)

Population (2020)
  - Total: 23,510
  - Density: 5,359/sq mi (2,069/km^{2})
- Time zone: UTC-8 (PST)
  - Summer (DST): UTC-7 (PDT)
- ZIP code: 95826, 95827
- Area codes: 916, 279
- FIPS code: 06-62910
- GNIS feature ID: 1659543

Rosemont is a census-designated place (CDP) in Sacramento County, California, United States. It is part of the Sacramento–Arden-Arcade–Roseville metropolitan area. The population rose to 23,510 at the 2020 census. It was 22,681 at the 2010 census, down from 22,904 at the 2000 census.

== Geography ==
Rosemont is located at 38°32′58″N 121°21′22″W (38.549506, -121.356211).

According to the United States Census Bureau, the CDP has a total area of 4.4 square miles (11 km^{2}), all land.

== Demographics ==
Historical population
Census	Pop.	Note	%±
1980	18,888		—
1990	22,851		21.0%
2000	22,904		0.2%
2010	22,681		−1.0%
2020	23,510		3.7%
U.S. Decennial Census; 1860–1870 1880-1890; 1900 1910 1920; 1930 1940 1950; 1960 1970 1980; 1990 2000 2010

=== 2020 census ===
As of the 2020 census, Rosemont had a population of 23,510 and a population density of 5,359.0 inhabitants per square mile (2,069.1/km^{2}). The census reported that 99.0% of the population lived in households, 0.2% lived in non-institutionalized group quarters, and 0.8% were institutionalized. All residents lived in urban areas, while none lived in rural areas.

The age distribution was 22.0% under the age of 18, 9.6% aged 18 to 24, 30.0% aged 25 to 44, 23.2% aged 45 to 64, and 15.3% who were 65 years of age or older. The median age was 35.9 years. For every 100 females there were 95.3 males, and for every 100 females age 18 and over there were 91.8 males age 18 and over.

There were 8,762 households, of which 30.9% had children under the age of 18 living in them. Of all households, 40.9% were married-couple households, 8.3% were cohabiting couple households, 31.5% had a female householder with no partner present, and 19.3% had a male householder with no partner present. About 24.8% of all households were made up of individuals and 10.1% had someone living alone who was 65 years of age or older. The average household size was 2.66. There were 5,790 families (66.1% of all households).

There were 9,036 housing units at an average density of 2,059.7 units per square mile (795.3 units/km^{2}), of which 97.0% were occupied. Of these, 57.8% were owner-occupied, and 42.2% were occupied by renters. The homeowner vacancy rate was 0.7%, and the rental vacancy rate was 3.9%.

Racial composition as of the 2020 census
Race	Number	Percent
White	11,507	48.9%
Black or African American	2,859	12.2%
American Indian and Alaska Native	259	1.1%
Asian	2,804	11.9%
Native Hawaiian and Other Pacific Islander	202	0.9%
Some other race	2,375	10.1%
Two or more races	3,504	14.9%
Hispanic or Latino (of any race)	5,588	23.8%

=== 2023 American Community Survey estimates ===
In 2023, the US Census Bureau estimated that 17.3% of the population were foreign-born. Of all people aged 5 or older, 73.0% spoke only English at home, 11.1% spoke Spanish, 7.9% spoke other Indo-European languages, 7.2% spoke Asian or Pacific Islander languages, and 0.8% spoke other languages. Of those aged 25 or older, 94.1% were high school graduates and 30.1% had a bachelor's degree.

The median household income in 2023 was $86,178, and the per capita income was $37,735. About 12.1% of families and 15.5% of the population were below the poverty line.

=== 2010 census ===
The 2010 United States census reported that Rosemont had a population of 22,681. The population density was 5,215.0 inhabitants per square mile (2,013.5/km^{2}). The racial makeup of Rosemont was 13,496 (59.5%) White, 2,720 (12.0%) African American, 310 (1.4%) Native American, 2,419 (10.7%) Asian, 134 (0.6%) Pacific Islander, 1,754 (7.7%) from other races, and 1,848 (8.1%) from two or more races. Hispanic or Latino of any race were 4,587 persons (20.2%).

The Census reported that 22,395 people (98.7% of the population) lived in households, 66 (0.3%) lived in non-institutionalized group quarters, and 220 (1.0%) were institutionalized.

There were 8,363 households, out of which 2,864 (34.2%) had children under the age of 18 living in them, 3,571 (42.7%) were opposite-sex married couples living together, 1,372 (16.4%) had a female householder with no husband present, 556 (6.6%) had a male householder with no wife present. There were 640 (7.7%) unmarried opposite-sex partnerships, and 86 (1.0%) same-sex married couples or partnerships. 2,033 households (24.3%) were made up of individuals, and 584 (7.0%) had someone living alone who was 65 years of age or older. The average household size was 2.68. There were 5,499 families (65.8% of all households); the average family size was 3.18.

The age distribution was 5,525 people (24.4%) under the age of 18, 2,611 people (11.5%) aged 18 to 24, 6,496 people (28.6%) aged 25 to 44, 5,798 people (25.6%) aged 45 to 64, and 2,251 people (9.9%) who were 65 years of age or older. The median age was 33.9 years. For every 100 females, there were 96.7 males. For every 100 females age 18 and over, there were 91.0 males.

There were 8,991 housing units at an average density of 2,067.3 per square mile (798.2/km^{2}), of which 4,899 (58.6%) were owner-occupied, and 3,464 (41.4%) were occupied by renters. The homeowner vacancy rate was 1.9%; the rental vacancy rate was 8.2%. 12,822 people (56.5% of the population) lived in owner-occupied housing units and 9,573 people (42.2%) lived in rental housing units.

== Boundaries and community ==
The boundaries of Rosemont are Folsom Boulevard to the north, Bradshaw Road to the east, Jackson Highway (State Route 16) to the south, and South Watt Avenue to the west. The commercial district of Rosemont, which includes retail and dining establishments, is primarily located along Kiefer Boulevard. Rosemont contains a mixture of houses dating from the 1950s to newly constructed units.

Rosemont has a voluntary Community Association–known as the Rosemont Community Association (RCA)–designed to serve as the community's advocate on local and county issues and to sponsor community events and programs.

== Government ==
In the California State Legislature, Rosemont is in the 8th senatorial district, represented by Democrat Angelique Ashby, and in the 7th Assembly district, represented by Republican Josh Hoover.

In the United States House of Representatives, Rosemont is in California's 6th congressional district, represented by Democrat Ami Bera.

== Education ==
There are three elementary schools in Rosemont. Golden Empire Elementary is located in the southern portion of Rosemont. Sequoia Elementary is located in the northwest portion of Rosemont, and James W. Marshall is located on the boundary of Rosemont and Lincoln Village/Rancho Cordova in the northeast portion of Rosemont. The community's only middle school Albert Einstein Middle School is located in the central portion, and is named after Albert Einstein. Rosemont High School was opened in 2003, and is located on the east side of Rosemont. The community is served by the Sacramento City Unified School District.

== Transportation ==
Sacramento Regional Transit operates the "Gold Line" of the light rail system which runs parallel to Folsom Boulevard. The Watt/Manlove station is a transfer point to several bus lines. Other stations in the community are Starfire Station, Tiber Station and Butterfield Station. Bus 72 is the main bus that runs through the central portion of Rosemont. The main roadways are Kiefer Boulevard, South Watt Avenue, Mayhew Road, Bradshaw Road, and Folsom Boulevard. U.S. Route 50 runs through the northeastern portion of Rosemont.

== Notable resident ==
- Anthony Padilla and Ian Hecox - Internet Comedians from Smosh who filmed majority of their videos in Hecox's Rosemont home until 2016
