= Historic Folsom station =

Light rail station in Folsom, California, U.S.

Historic Folsom
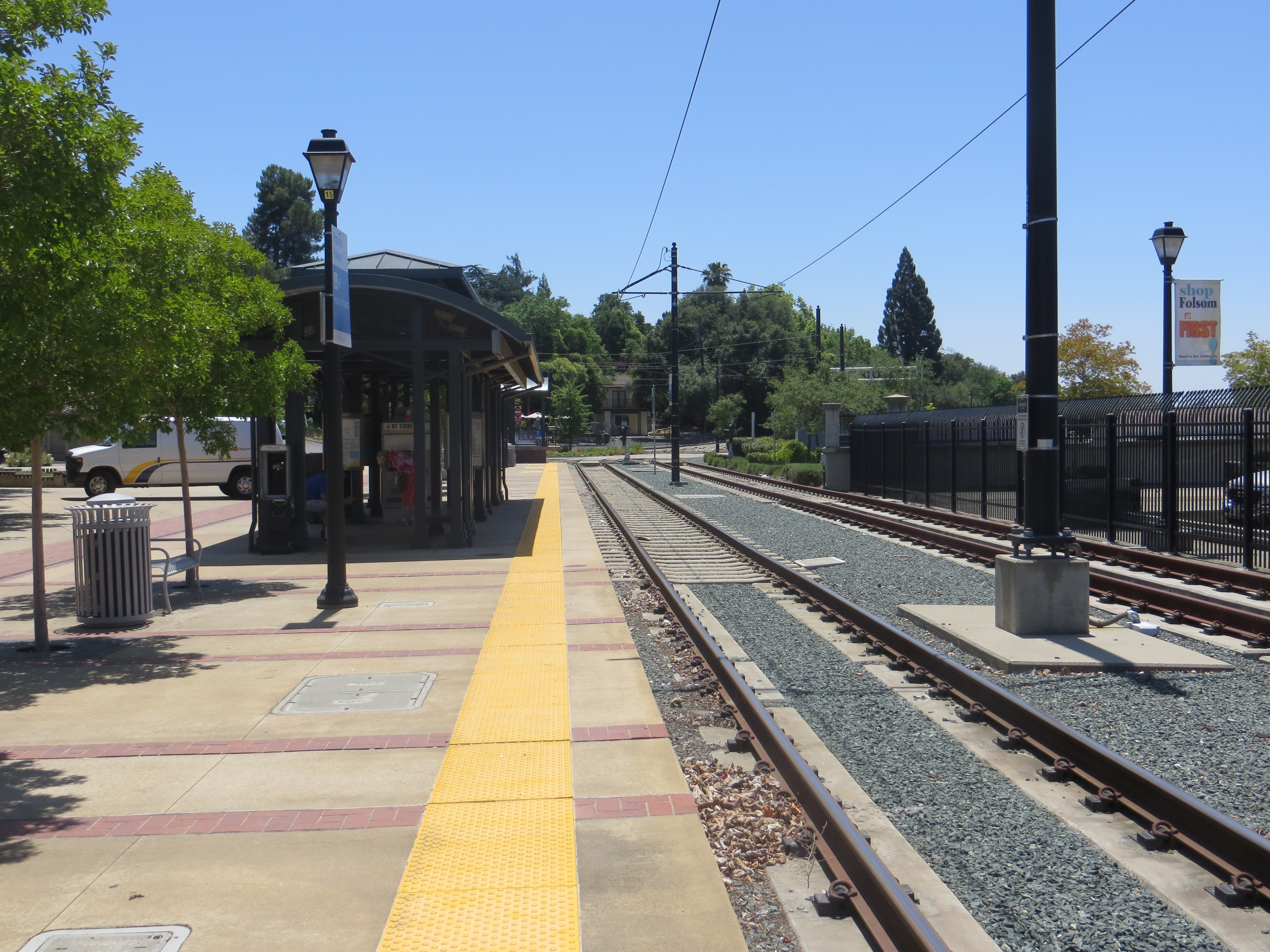
- Historic Folsom station platform, May 2014

General information
- Location: Sutter Street at Reading Street; Folsom, California; United States
- Coordinates: 38°40′33″N 121°10′50″W
- Owner: Sacramento Regional Transit District
- Platforms: 1 side platform
- Tracks: 2
- Connections: Sacramento Regional Transit: F10, SmaRT Ride Folsom

Construction
- Structure type: At-grade
- Parking: 102 spaces
- Cycle facilities: Lockers
- Accessible: Yes

History
- Opened: October 15, 2005; 20 years ago

Services
Preceding station	SacRT	Following station
Glenn toward Sacramento Valley Station	Gold Line	Terminus
Location

Historic Folsom station is a side platformed SacRT light rail station in Folsom, California, United States. The station was opened on October 15, 2005, is operated by the Sacramento Regional Transit District and is the current eastern terminus of the Gold Line. The station is located near the intersection of Sutter Street and Reading Street, adjacent to the Western-themed city center.
