= Paintersville Bridge =

Bridge on the Sacramento River

- View of the Paintersville Bridge in 2014
- Coordinates: 38.318630°N 121.577730°W
- Carries: 2 lanes of SR 160
- Crosses: Sacramento River
- Locale: Sacramento County, California, U.S.
- Owner: State of California
- Maintained by: California Department of Transportation
- ID number: NBI 24 0053

Characteristics
- Design: Pratt through truss
- Total length: 179.2 m (588 ft)
- Width: 5.9 m (19 ft)
- Longest span: 68.9 m (226 ft)
- Clearance below: 4.19 m (13.7 ft)

History
- Opened: 1923; 103 years ago

Statistics
- Daily traffic: 1,550 (2009)

Location
- Interactive map of Paintersville Bridge

The Paintersville Bridge is a bridge in the United States. Located in Northern California, it crosses the Sacramento River. Carrying California State Route 160, it connects Paintersville, an unincorporated community to the east of the bridge, and Sutter Island to the west.

== History ==
In 1923, the Strauss Bascule Bridge Company, owned by Joseph Strauss, designed and constructed the Paintersville Bridge. It was designed to be a part of the Victory Highway, a transcontinental highway from San Francisco to New York City as the highway crossed through the California Delta region. Previously, a bridge tender's house was used to operate the bridge; it has since been replaced by a modern control panel operated by automated computer systems. In 1953, the original wooden deck was replaced with a steel grid deck, and the bridge was further rehabilitated in 2000.

== Usage ==
The Paintersville Bridge carries California State Route 160 over the Sacramento River. SR 160 runs along the western bank of the river from Isleton and crosses the bridge to the eastern bank, after which it continues to run towards Sacramento. The bridge itself is 179.2 meters (588 ft) long and 5.9 meters (19 ft) wide, with a vertical clearance of 4.19 meters (13.7 ft) above the Sacramento river.
