= Transportation in the Sacramento metropolitan area =

Multi-modal network moving people and goods in California

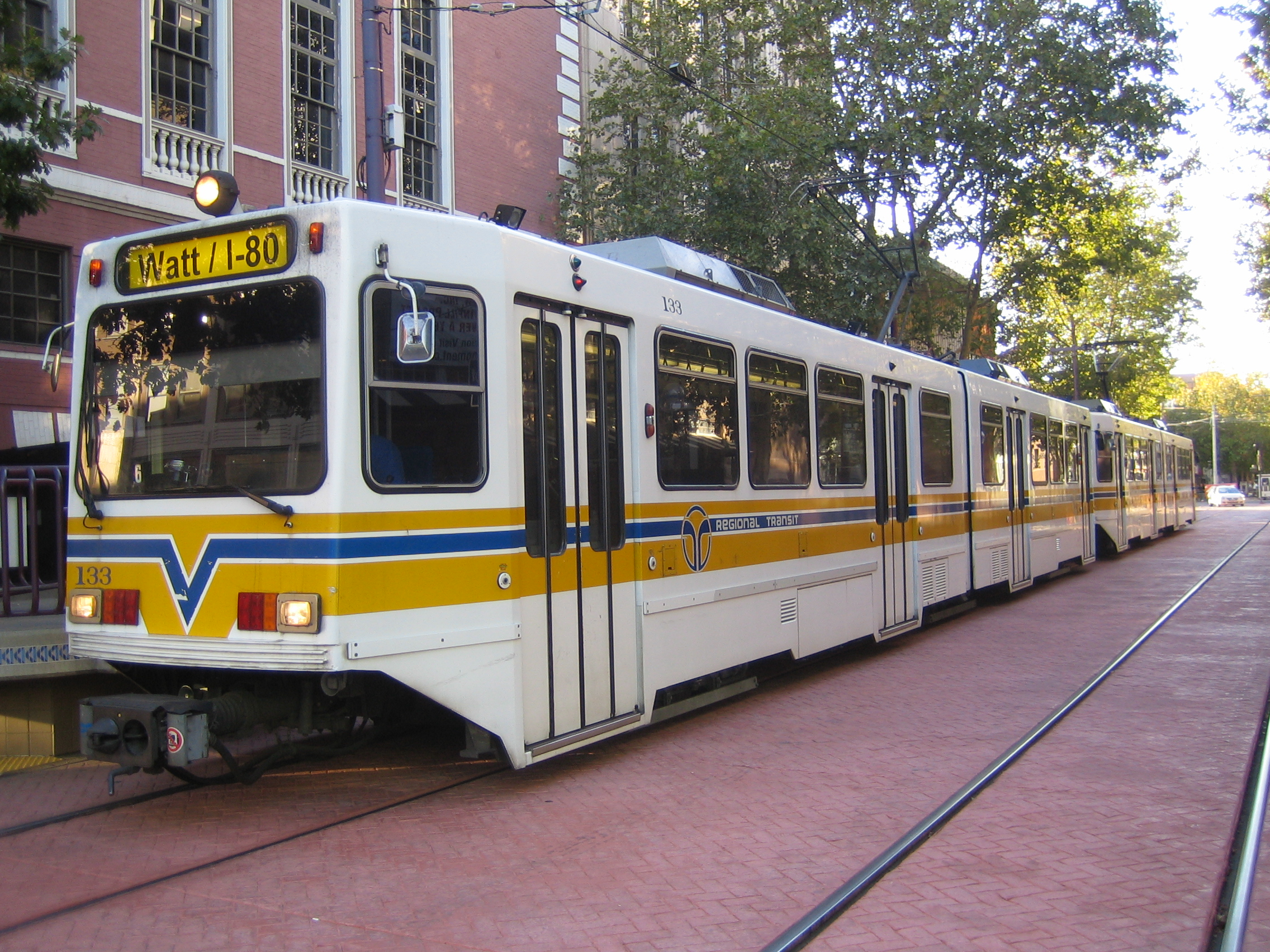
A SacRT light rail train

Transportation in the Sacramento metropolitan area consists of a variety of modes of travel in El Dorado, Placer, Sacramento, and Yolo counties, which are the four counties that comprise the Sacramento metropolitan area.

== Background ==
Studies show that a vast majority of people in the area commute via personal automobile, with 76.9% driving alone and 9.5% carpooling, aided by carpool lanes which expedite their commute. A further 7.03% of workers in the region work from home, so the transportation modes of the remaining roughly 6.5% are rounded out by public transit, cycling, walking, motorcycle riding, and other means.

== Roads and highways ==
=== Major freeways ===
==== Interstate 5 (I-5) ====
Interstate 5 (I-5) is the north–south interstate highway that runs through the Sacramento metropolitan area.

To the south, I-5 provides service to Stockton, Los Angeles, and San Diego before its southern terminus at the Mexico–United States border. To the north, it provides service to Redding, Portland, and Seattle before its northern terminus at the Canada–United States border.

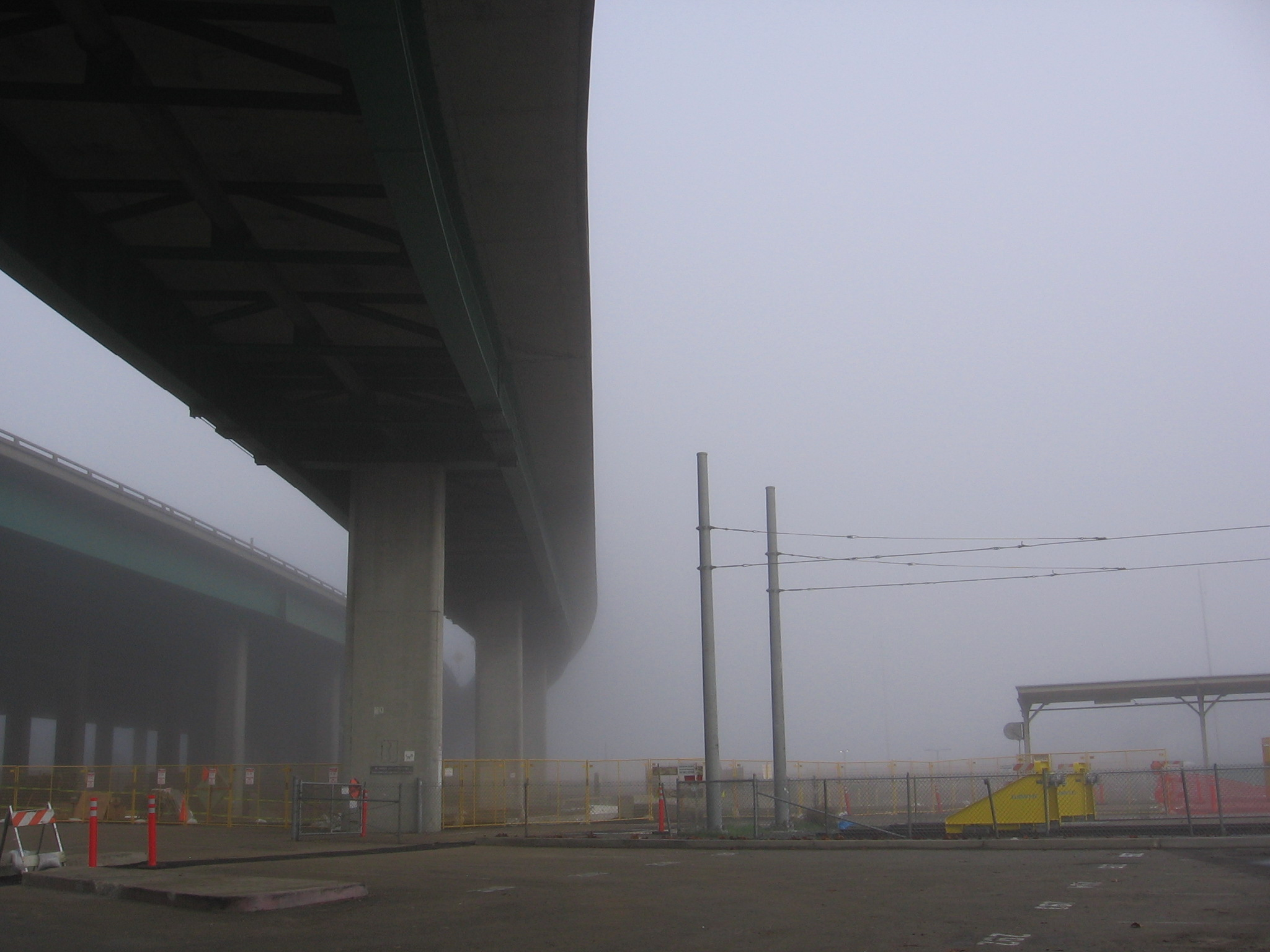
I-5 in Downtown Sacramento at the far left, with the I Street on-ramp to its right, looking up from a surface street

The highway enters Sacramento County from the south near Thornton, then continues northward through the western edge of Elk Grove that is mostly uninhabited wetlands with the exception of Laguna West. As I-5 approaches the city limits of Sacramento near Freeport, it runs adjacent to the Sacramento River that is on the west. The river then makes an abrupt westward curve after which the highway is flanked by the south Sacramento neighborhoods of Pocket-Greenhaven on the west and Meadowview on the east. The river curves back and meets with I-5 again, closing up the Pocket area. The highway then continues along the west side of Land Park, passing by William Land Park and the Sacramento Zoo. As it reaches the southwest corner of the downtown grid, the highway has a full-service junction with the 50/Business 80 freeway, and also merges with California State Route 99 for a concurrency.

==== Interstate 80 (I-80) ====
Interstate 80 (I-80) is the east–west Interstate Highway that runs through the Sacramento metropolitan area.

To the west, I-80 provides service to Fairfield, Oakland, and San Francisco. To the east, it provides service to Reno, Salt Lake City, Omaha and beyond to its eastern terminus on the East Coast in Teaneck, New Jersey.

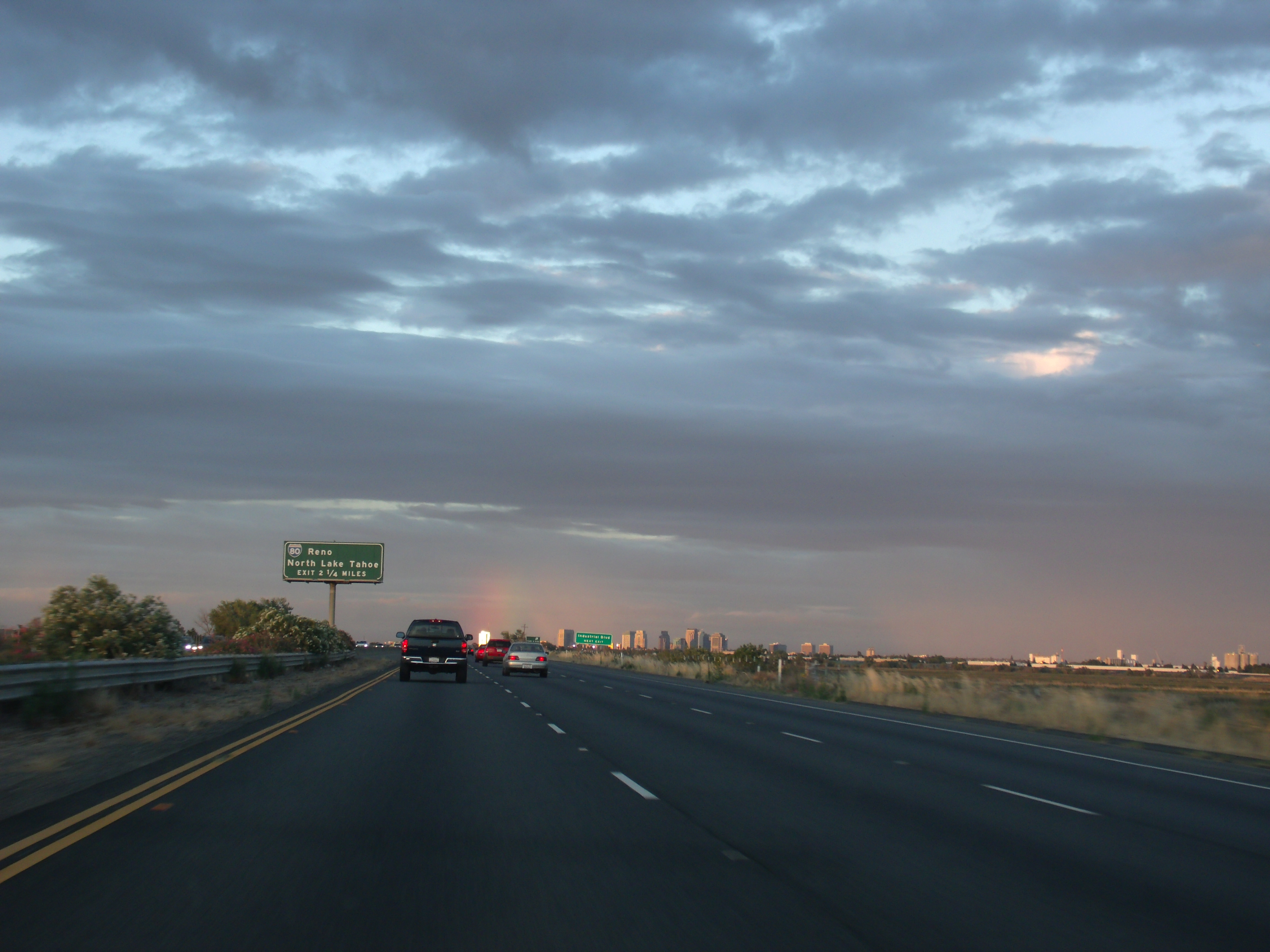
Sacramento as seen from the distance in the eastbound lanes of I-80 in Yolo County

Within the Sacramento region, I-80 follows more of a northeast–southwest direction than a true east–west direction, owing to both the local topography and the orientation of the nearby destination cities (Reno and San Francisco).

It enters the region on the west from the Bay Area in Yolo County along the south side of UC Davis and after passing through the city of Davis, it crosses the Yolo Bypass (a major flood bypass for Sacramento) on the Yolo Causeway. Soon after touching down in West Sacramento, it splits northward away from the western terminus of the concurrent Highway 50 and Business Loop 80, thus bypassing Downtown Sacramento which Route 50 and Business 80 concurrently serve.

After the split, I-80 passes through the western side of West Sacramento, then continues on to cross over the Sacramento River, and passes through the middle of Natomas, where it has a full interchange with Interstate 5 (I-5). It then moves along the northern suburbs of Sacramento, North Sacramento and Del Paso Heights, before being joined by Business 80 at its eastern terminus in the southern part of North Highlands near the Sacramento McClellan Airport.

The route continues on towards Citrus Heights, Roseville (where it leaves Sacramento County and enters Placer County), and Rocklin, where it has an interchange with the southern end of California State Route 65 (SR 65). At this point, I-80 virtually exits the farthest suburban sprawl of Sacramento along the route, and rises in elevation as it passes through smaller mountainous and rural communities of the Sierra Nevada mountain range.

==== U.S. Route 50 (US 50) ====
U.S. Route 50 (US 50) is an east–west U.S. Highway through the Sacramento area that has its western terminus in West Sacramento, and provides service further east to South Lake Tahoe, Kansas City, Cincinnati and Washington, D.C. before its eastern terminus in Ocean City, Maryland.

US 50 begins by branching off in West Sacramento from I-80, thus creating its western terminus. This portion of the highway is also concurrent with Interstate 80 Business, so they also share the western terminus. In the eastern part of West Sacramento, a short spur route peels away from US 50 in the form of California State Route 275 (SR 275), providing direct access to the Tower Bridge and Capitol Mall in Sacramento. After US 50 crosses over the Sacramento River, it meets Interstate 5 (I-5) at a full junction at the southwestern corner of Downtown Sacramento.

Following the I-5 junction, US 50 runs on a freeway section commonly referred to as the WX Freeway due to it being flanked by the parallel one-way W and X Streets, along the south side of Downtown Sacramento. This part of the freeway is also built upon a raised embankment, to allow the many city streets to pass under it. The route then hits an interchange with a crossing freeway where Business 80 is the route heading north, and SR 99 is the route heading south.

Following that interchange, US 50 goes between East Sacramento on the north and Oak Park in the south, providing convenient access to the UC Davis Medical Center in the northern part of Oak Park. It then routes along the southern tip of the California State University, Sacramento (CSUS or Sac State) campus with special ramps to get drivers directly between the campus and the freeway. It continues to eastern Sacramento suburbs including La Riviera, Rosemont, Rancho Cordova, and Folsom. This section of the highway east of Sac State is known to be a busy office corridor heavily concentrated with office parks, thus also causing traffic jams in both directions during rush hour.

As the highway exits Folsom, it also exits the farthest urban sprawl in that direction, climbs in elevation, and enters the more rural El Dorado County. It makes its way through many small municipalities, including Placerville and Pollock Pines and then reaches South Lake Tahoe.

==== California State Route 99 (SR 99) ====
California State Route 99 (SR 99) is a north–south state highway in the Sacramento area. To the south, it serves the Central Valley cities of Stockton, Modesto, Fresno, and Bakersfield before terminating at the Wheeler Ridge Interchange to join I-5. To the north, SR 99 provides service to Yuba City and Chico, terminating in Red Bluff.

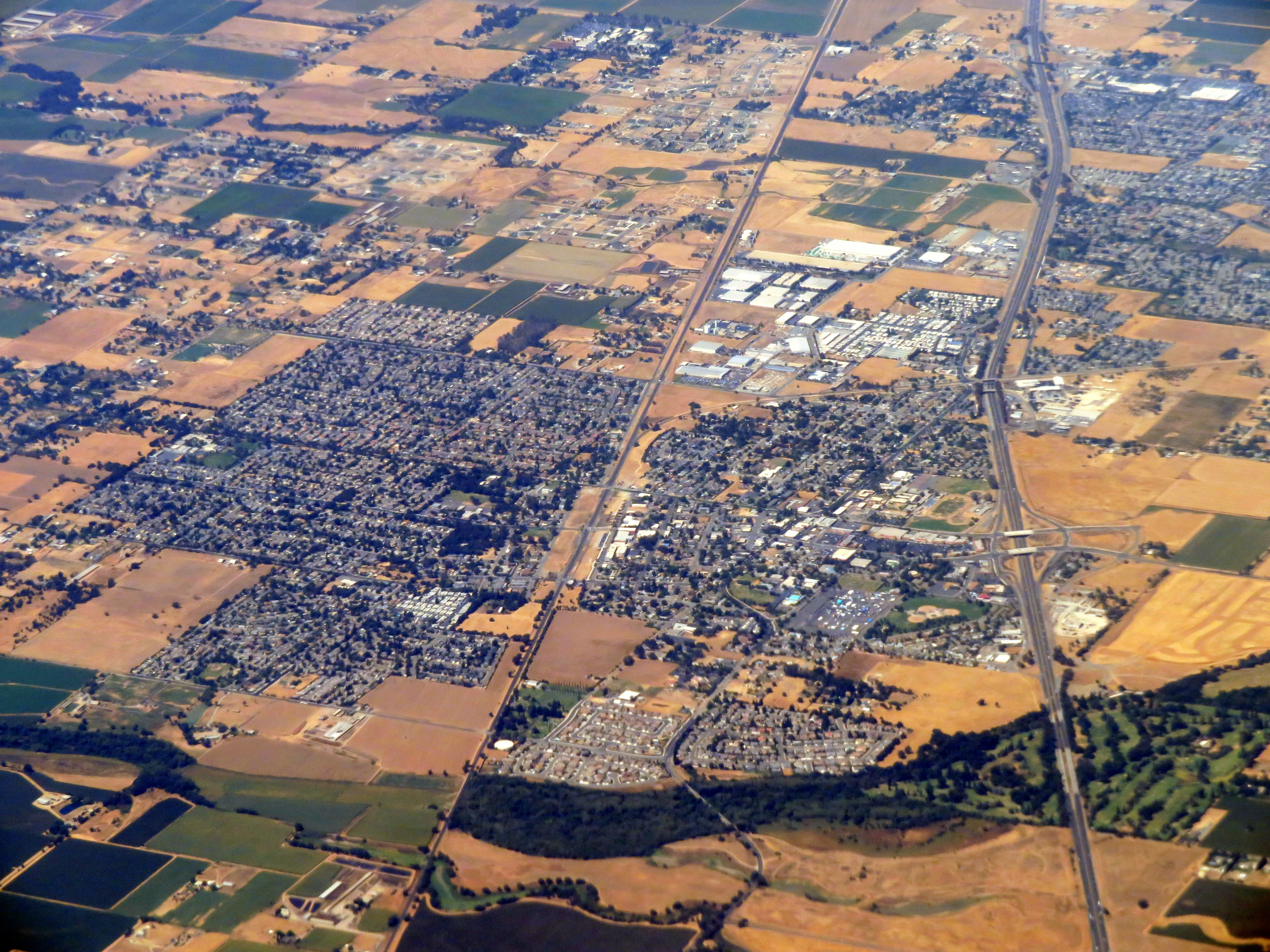
SR 99 passing through Galt at the right side of the picture

SR 99 reaches the Sacramento region from the south at Galt, a small town that is a distant exurb of Sacramento. It then routes along the west side of the rural farming communities Herald and Wilton before going through the core of Sacramento's suburban city on the south, Elk Grove. As it leaves Elk Grove, it passes by Cosumnes River College and a medical complex consisting of three major hospitals: Methodist Hospital of Sacramento, Sierra Vista Hospital, and the Kaiser Permanente South Sacramento Medical Center. The college and medical complex are both immediately to the west of SR 99; there are exits to Bruceville Road designed to give emergency vehicles easy and quick access to the hospitals. The highway then goes through the heart of South Sacramento, providing access to local points of importance such as the Florin Towne Centre and Little Saigon (Sacramento). North of South Sacramento, SR 99 is flanked by Curtis Park on the west and Oak Park on the east; Sacramento City College is accessible as it is roughly a half mile west of the freeway at this point, and the McGeorge School of Law in Oak Park is right next to the freeway as well.

At the junction with US 50 in the southeastern part of the central city, the thru lanes turn into the eastern section of Business 80. SR 99 does not continue straight, and instead connects to US 50 in the stretch west of the junction also known as the WX Freeway, in an unsigned concurrency (along with Business 80). At the interchange with I-5, SR 99 again does not pull through, and instead routes north onto the perpendicular I-5 for another unsigned concurrency.

SR 99 splits off from I-5 in North Natomas, with a slight northward jog, while I-5 makes a much sharper curve westward towards Sacramento International Airport and Woodland. SR 99 soon leaves Sacramento County, headed for Yuba City and Chico.

==== Business Loop 80 (Bus. 80) ====
Business Loop 80 (Bus. 80), (also known as Business Route 80, Business 80, Capital City Freeway, "Cap City Freeway", and "Biz 80"), is a business loop of Interstate 80 (I-80) in Sacramento.

Route map of Business 80 in Sacramento shown in red

It has two segments, western and eastern. The western segment runs concurrently with US 50 from its western terminus in West Sacramento all the way to the US 50/SR 99/Bus. 80 interchange at the southeastern corner of the central city.

At the interchange, the western segment of Bus. 80 does not pull through, and instead becomes the eastern segment that branches north from the junction (via connector ramps). The eastern segment (albeit more in a north–south orientation) is flanked by a pair of one-way streets, 29th Street and 30th Street, dividing Midtown Sacramento on the west and East Sacramento on the east. The Sutter medical complex in Midtown, consisting of Sutter Medical Center and Sutter General Hospital, is immediately to the west of the freeway, as is Sutter's Fort, a historic park. Bus. 80 then crosses over the American River into the Arden-Arcade area, providing access to Arden Fair Mall (a popular shopping mall) and Cal Expo (site of the annual California State Fair and other big local events throughout the year). Around this point, the freeway also converges with California State Route 160 (SR 160), a highway that provides direct travel to Downtown Sacramento from the Arden-Arcade area. After passing through Arden-Arcade, the freeway rejoins I-80, thus terminating.

=== Other highways ===
Several additional freeways were planned by Caltrans in the 1960s, but were later rejected due to local protests and opposition. The county Board of Supervisors formally endorsed the cancellation of several freeway plans in December 1974. In particular, the cancellation of State Routes 65 (south of Roseville), 143, and 244 (south of Auburn Boulevard) deprived the Sacramento metropolitan area of direct freeway routes between most southern and eastern suburbs (to bypass downtown Sacramento). This has resulted in severe traffic congestion on US 50 and several suburban arterial roads.

==== California State Route 16 (SR 16) ====
California State Route 16 (SR 16) is an east–west state highway that travels from SR 20 near Wilbur Springs to SR 49 between Plymouth and Drytown.

It enters the Sacramento metropolitan area at the west end through Yolo County. It takes a southeastward path through the small communities of Rumsey, Guinda, and Brooks. The route then turns eastward and passes through Esparto, California before crossing I-505. As it approaches Woodland, SR 16 turns 90 degrees to a northward direction at an intersection on the western edge of town. It then converges with I-5 towards Sacramento on an unsigned concurrency.

Combined with I-5, SR 16 travels past the Sacramento International Airport, across I-80, and through Downtown Sacramento along the Sacramento River before turning onto US 50 towards South Lake Tahoe at the junction.

The route pulls through the interchange with SR 99/Bus. 80, then exits US 50 at Howe Avenue just east of Sacramento State University. SR 16 is carried on the Howe Avenue section that is south of US 50 for a very short distance before turning eastward onto Folsom Boulevard. Less than a mile later, the route branches off from Folsom Boulevard on the south side as Jackson Road, and it is also the beginning of the signed portion east of the concurrency. It continues for many miles through unincorporated communities in Sacramento County, including Sloughhouse and Rancho Murieta before exiting the county (and the metropolitan area) into Amador County, headed for Plymouth, Drytown, and Jackson.

The signed portion of the route is generally a two-lane highway in its entirety.

==== California State Route 65 (SR 65) ====
California State Route 65 (SR 65) is a state highway that runs between Roseville and Olivehurst.

Its southern terminus is at the junction with I-80 in the northeast part of Roseville. It begins as a freeway to Lincoln. After reaching Lincoln it becomes an expressway. It then passes Sheridan and Wheatland before terminating in Olivehurst, where it converges with California State Route 70 to continue on to Marysville.

==== California State Route 84 (SR 84) ====
California State Route 84 (SR 84) is a north–south state highway that runs between Rio Vista in Solano County and the Sacramento–San Joaquin River Delta, and West Sacramento in Yolo County.

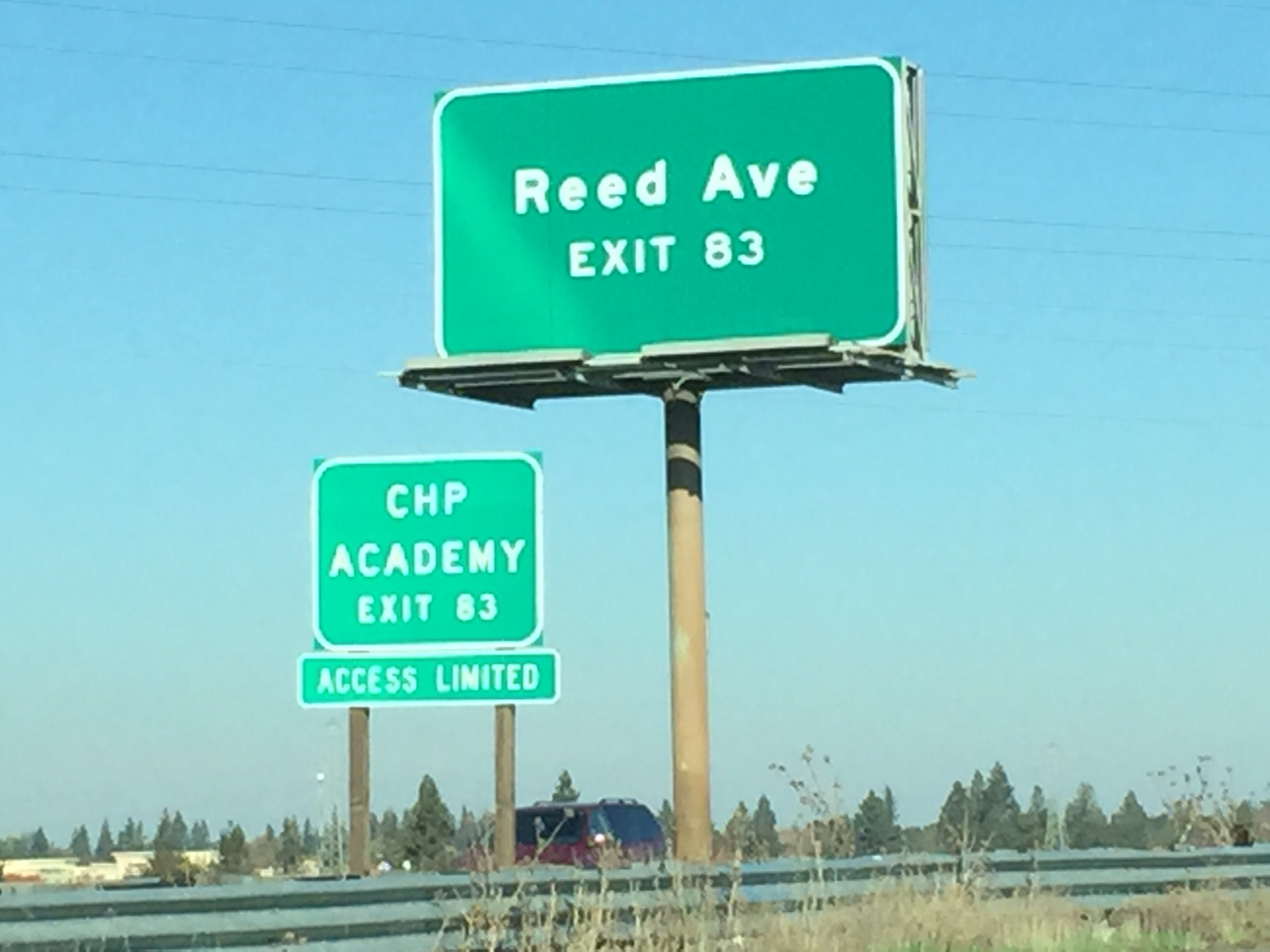
The exit from I-80 shown here is the northern terminus of SR 84, also referred to as Reed Avenue in that area.

It enters the Sacramento region on the south side through Yolo County near Courtland. The route turns eastward for a short distance, then turns north where it becomes Jefferson Boulevard. SR 84 retains that name through West Sacramento, where it crosses and interchanges with US 50. Shortly afterwards, the route changes roads and turns westward at a 4-way intersection, becoming Sacramento Avenue and then Reed Avenue before terminating at its junction with I-80.

==== California State Route 113 (SR 113) ====
California State Route 113 (SR 113) is a state highway that is primarily used as a north–south multi-lane freeway that carries traffic directly between I-80 near UC Davis and I-5 in Woodland.

From the south, SR 113 originates as a two-lane highway near Rio Vista, then travels through Dixon, after which it co-signs the portion of I-80 between Dixon and the connector ramp to its own freeway alignment near UC Davis. The freeway portion routes all the way to Woodland, where it briefly overlaps with I-5, then exiting and heading towards Knights Landing as a two-lane highway again.

==== California State Route 160 (SR 160) ====
California State Route 160 (SR 160) is a north–south state highway that runs between Antioch in the Sacramento–San Joaquin River Delta and the North Sacramento area of Sacramento, with a gap in the non-freeway street portions within the city of Sacramento.

The route begins at its southern terminus in eastern Antioch, where it is formed by a junction with California State Route 4. It then crosses the Antioch Bridge, leaving Antioch and entering the tip of Sacramento County's southwestern panhandle in Sherman Island. The route winds its way along the Sacramento River and through the delta, passing through small river towns such as Isleton, Walnut Grove, Courtland, and Hood.

As SR 160 reaches the southern part of Sacramento near Cosumnes River Boulevard, it continues straight, deviating from the Sacramento River that curves westward. At this point, the southern portion of SR 160 ends and the route is now referred to as Freeport Boulevard, as it widens to a four-lane expressway. It passes through the Meadowview neighborhood and then forms the western boundary of the Sacramento Executive Airport as it goes through South Land Park. As it proceeds through the central part of Land Park, it divides Sacramento City College on the east and William Land Park on the west. Right before reaching the railroad tracks near 4th Avenue/Wayne Hultgren station, the former SR 160 turns northwest at its fork with 21st Street, still continuing as Freeport Boulevard (at the time until SR 160's relinquishment in the 2000s, northbound traffic continued on a one-way northbound 21st Street to Broadway, with Freeport serving as a one-way street for southbound traffic; both streets were converted to two-way streets in 2007).

The former highway joins Broadway and heads westward, then turning north onto the 15th Street/16th Street one-way pair into the downtown grid; 15th Street is southbound and 16th Street is northbound. In the northern part of downtown, 15th Street actually dead ends, so the southbound part of the former highway turns away from 15th Street at F Street for three city blocks, and north of F Street the southbound portion of the former highway is carried on 12th Street.

12th Street curves in the northern part of Downtown to be next to 16th Street and becomes a freeway, where the northern portion of SR 160 begins. The highway then turns northeastward, crosses the American River, and then turns eastward at the Del Paso Boulevard interchange (exit 46B). The route terminates where it converges with Business 80 in North Sacramento, near Arden Fair Mall.

=== California State Route 275 (SR 275) ===
California State Route 275 (SR 275) is a short spur route that peels off from US 50 in West Sacramento and provides direct access to Downtown Sacramento. After exiting US 50, the route runs along the north side of Raley Field, crosses the Tower Bridge, becomes Capitol Mall after touching down in Sacramento, and terminates at the front yard of the California State Capitol at 10th Street.

== Rail ==
=== Amtrak ===
The primary transit agency in the Sacramento metropolitan area for inter-city rail service is Amtrak. Amtrak serves the region with six stations and four routes. Locals can travel north, south, east, or west by rail using Amtrak to get to destinations all around California and beyond.

==== Stations ====
- Auburn station
- Colfax station
- Davis station
- Rocklin station
- Roseville station
- Sacramento Valley Station

==== Routes ====
- California Zephyr (Chicago–Emeryville) - serves Colfax, Roseville, Sacramento, and Davis
- Capitol Corridor (Auburn–San Jose) - serves Auburn, Rocklin, Roseville, Sacramento, and Davis
- Coast Starlight (Seattle–Los Angeles) - serves Sacramento and Davis
- Gold Runner (Bakersfield–Sacramento) - serves Sacramento

=== SacRT light rail ===
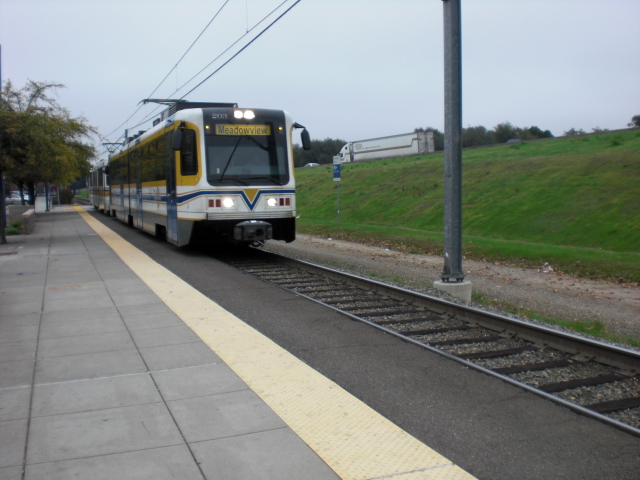
A Blue Line light rail train at the Roseville Road station

The Sacramento Regional Transit District provides light rail service in Sacramento and the surrounding communities. This SacRT light rail system has three lines and 54 stations. All the lines terminate in or travel through Downtown Sacramento, the central business district of Sacramento, and the main employment center for the metropolitan area. For commuters to downtown, light rail is a popular alternative to driving for various reasons. All light rail stations with a park-and-ride lot offer free parking (except for Cosumnes River College station, where the college operates and maintains the station), whereas formerly, many of the stations charged a fee for parking. Annual ridership on the system is about 14 million.

The system has three operational lines:

- Blue Line - north–south route that runs between Cosumnes River College and Watt/I-80. Also serves South Sacramento, Sacramento City College, Downtown Sacramento, North Sacramento, and North Highlands. Part of the line at the northern end is in the median of Interstate 80.
- Gold Line - east–west route that runs between Sacramento Valley Station and either Sunrise or Historic Folsom. Also serves Downtown Sacramento, Midtown Sacramento, East Sacramento, Sacramento State University, Rancho Cordova, and Gold River. For most of its length, the rail runs alongside US 50 and Folsom Boulevard
- Green Line - a short route that runs between 13th Street and 7th & Richards/Township 9. Compared to the other two lines, the Green Line has less operating hours and longer headways; it also has no weekend service. It is slated for future expansion to Natomas and the Sacramento International Airport.

For the Blue and Gold Lines, the trains operate from 4:30 a.m. to 12:30 a.m. Monday through Saturday, and 5 a.m. to 11 a.m. on Sunday. Headways are 15 minutes Monday through Friday until the evening, and 30 minutes during nights and weekends.

For the Green Line, trains operate from 6 a.m. to 8:30 p.m. Monday through Friday with 30-minute headways at all times. There is no weekend service.

=== Freight ===
Most of the rail freight transport in the Sacramento is by Union Pacific Railroad. On one particular route in Midtown Sacramento, 5-10 trains pass through per day. Today, Sacramento serves as a major junction between east–west and north–south railroad lines - from San Francisco to Chicago, and from San Diego to Seattle.

== Bus ==
=== Intercity bus services ===
Greyhound offers intercity bus service from two locations in the Sacramento area: Sacramento Bus Station and the Roseville Bus Stop. Megabus has intercity bus service between University/65th Street station in Sacramento and 4th and King Street station in San Francisco. The service makes up to five trips per day.

=== RT Bus ===
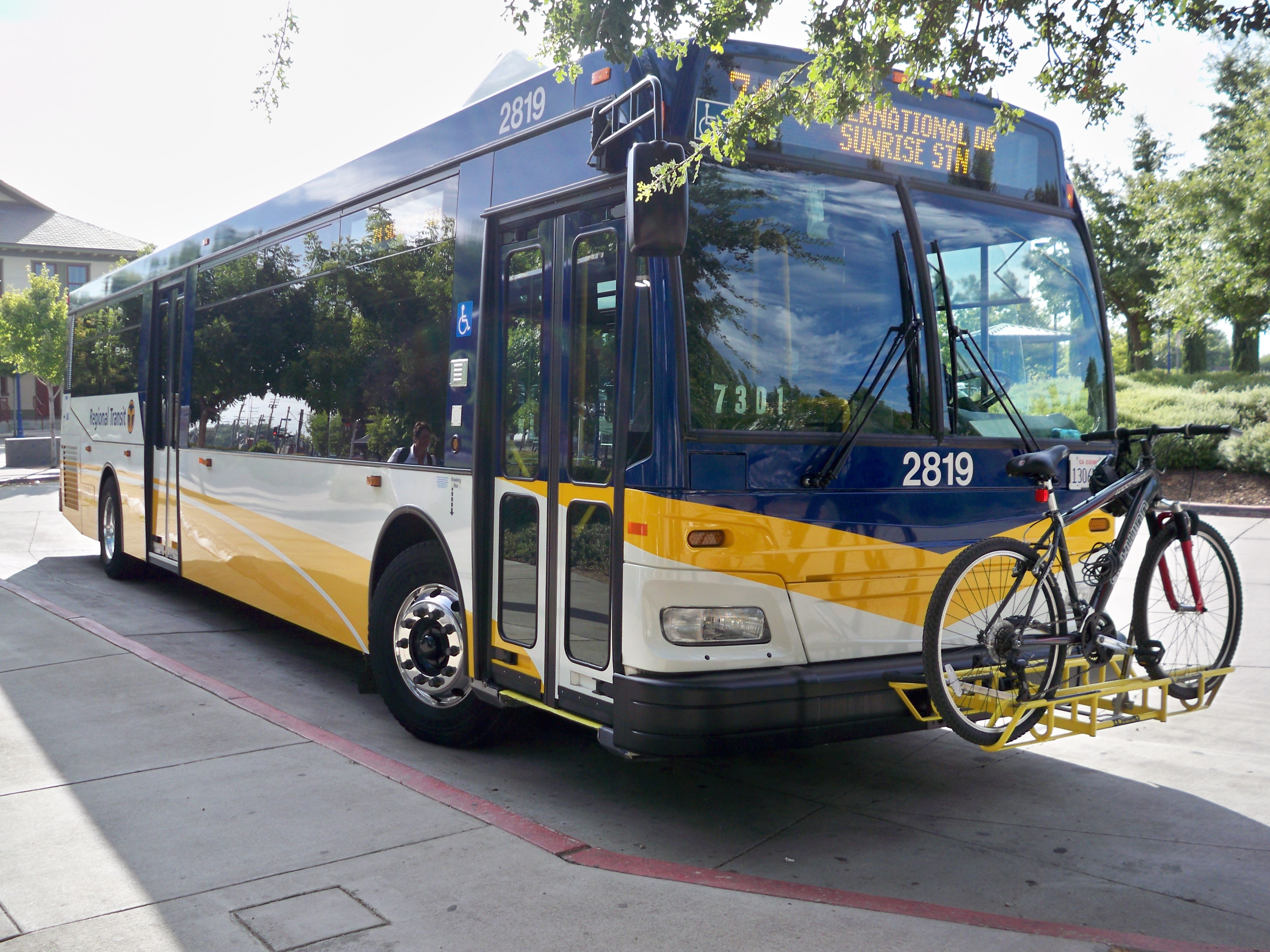
A Sacramento Regional Transit bus at the Mather Field/Mills station

The Sacramento Regional Transit District offers local bus service throughout the City of Sacramento and some surrounding areas from 5 a.m. until 11 p.m. daily. The bus system consists of 70 routes and over 3,100 total bus stops. Ever since the light rail opened, the buses have primarily acted as feeders to the light rail routes. Headways are between 15 minutes and 80 minutes. Some routes operate on weekdays only or peak hours only.

=== Other local bus agencies ===
- E-tran is the local bus agency for the city of Elk Grove. It offers local routes, commuter routes to and from Downtown Sacramento (including one reverse commuter route), and a commuter route to the Butterfield station and the Franchise Tax Board.
- Yolobus is the local bus agency for Yolo County providing service all throughout the county, but primarily to the three main cities of West Sacramento, Davis, and Woodland. It also has routes extending to Downtown Sacramento, the Sacramento International Airport, Yolobus is the only public transit agency that currently offers regularly scheduled service to the airport.
- Unitrans is the bus transit system that operates in and around UC Davis, ferrying students and faculty between the campus and various locations around Davis. The system is run by the university's students.
- Roseville Transit is the transit system serving the northeastern Sacramento suburb of Roseville. It has fourteen local routes, and eight trips per day on the weekdays servicing Downtown Sacramento for commuters.
- Placer County Transit serves the suburbanized western portion of Placer County besides Roseville. Routes provide service to Alta, Auburn, Colfax, Lincoln, Rocklin, and Sierra College. From Auburn, Placer County Transit also has bus routes to the Watt/I-80 station and commuter buses to Downtown Sacramento.
- El Dorado Transit is the transit agency serving El Dorado County, including the towns of Cameron Park, Diamond Springs, Placerville, and Pollock Pines. In addition to serving locales within El Dorado County, the bus system also has eleven daily commuter routes to Downtown Sacramento, two reverse commuter routes from Downtown Sacramento, and service to the Iron Point station and Folsom Lake College.

=== Commuter buses from outside the region ===
The following bus agencies are all based outside of the Sacramento metropolitan area, but provide regularly scheduled commuter bus routes to and from Downtown Sacramento on the weekdays.

- Yuba-Sutter Transit - from Yuba City, Marysville, Olivehurst, Plumas Lake
- Amador Transit - from Sutter Creek/Sutter Hill/Jackson, Drytown, Rancho Murieta
- San Joaquin Regional Transit District - from Stockton, Lodi

== Air ==
=== Sacramento International Airport (SMF) ===
Sacramento International Airport (SMF) is the commercial airport serving the region. The airport is located 10 miles northwest of Downtown Sacramento. It is run by the Sacramento County Airport system. Southwest Airlines accounts for about half of the airport's passengers. Through SMF, passengers can fly directly to many major cities across the contiguous United States as well as Mexico, Vancouver, and Hawaii. To fly directly to transcontinental destinations (particularly in Asia), many locals instead opt to fly from the much busier San Francisco International Airport.

SMF has two parallel north–south runways owing to the prevailing wind patterns of the region. The two runways are 16L/34R (8,605 ft. concrete) and 16R/34L (8,598 ft. asphalt). There are two terminals at SMF, Terminal A and Terminal B:

- Terminal A - 13 gates; hosts Air Canada, American, Delta, and United
- Terminal B - 19 gates; hosts Aeroméxico, Alaska, Frontier, Hawaiian, JetBlue, Southwest Airlines, and Volaris

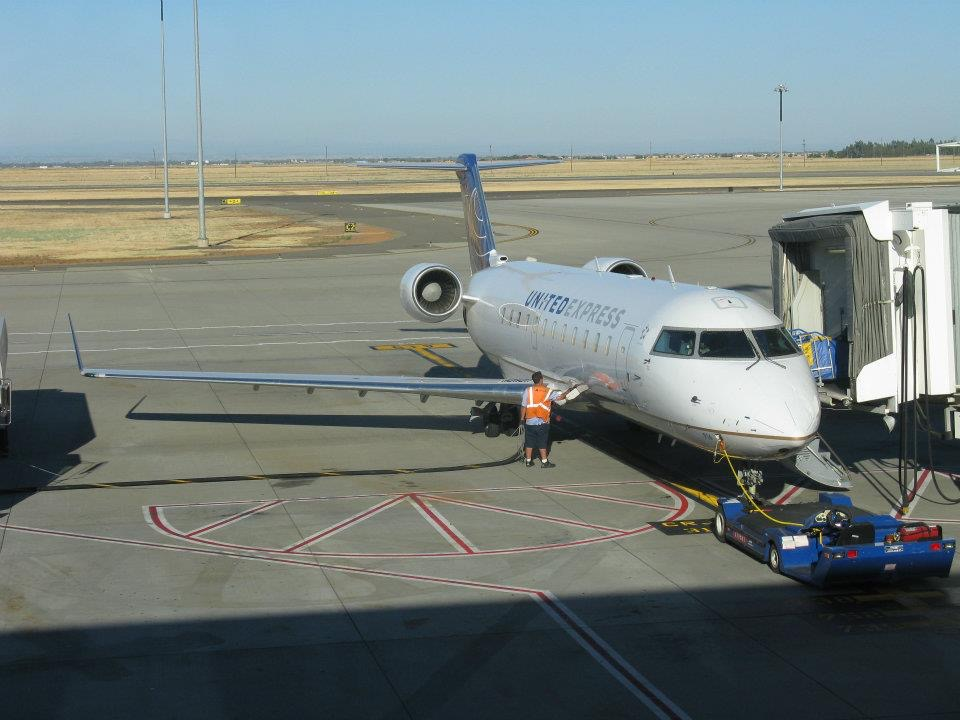
A United Express plane sitting on the tarmac at Sacramento International Airport

=== Other airports ===
There are many other smaller airports in the Sacramento metropolitan area which serve purposes such as general aviation, air taxi, air charter, air cargo, and military aviation. The list of those airports is as follows:

- Auburn Municipal Airport
- Blue Canyon–Nyack Airport
- Borges–Clarksburg Airport
- Cameron Airpark
- Elk Grove Airport
- Franklin Field
- Georgetown Airport
- Lake Tahoe Airport
- Lincoln Regional Airport
- Placerville Airport
- Rancho Murieta Airport
- Sacramento Executive Airport
- Sacramento Mather Airport
- Sacramento McClellan Airport
- Swansboro Country Airport
- Truckee Tahoe Airport
- University Airport
- Yolo County Airport

== Marine ==
Some of Sacramento's freight shipping and trading is done to and from the Port of Sacramento in West Sacramento, and through the Sacramento Deep Water Ship Channel.

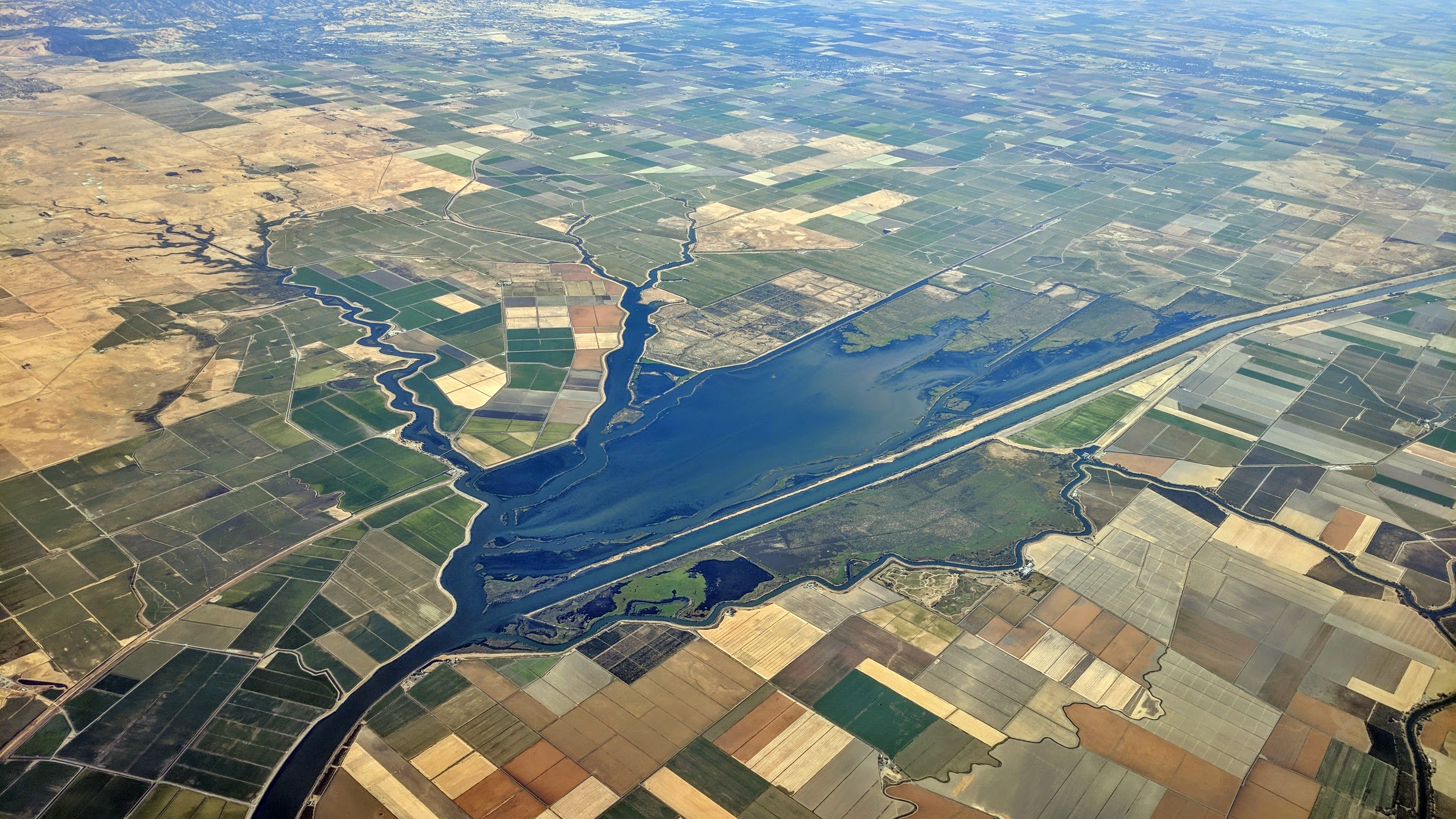
The Sacramento Deep Water Ship Channel is a manmade canal created to facilitate marine trading between the Port of Sacramento and the Port of Oakland

The Sacramento Deep Water Ship Channel was a manmade canal created to exchange goods with the Port of Oakland. Most of the items shipped are agricultural products and bulk goods, not container shipments.

== Cycling ==
In Sacramento, cycling is a common means of transportation, especially in the central city (Downtown and Midtown), where residents and visitors find it to be safe, cheap, and efficient. Many of the city streets in the urban core have 3 ft. wide designated bike lanes, some are painted bright green, and some are placed between the sidewalk and the parked cars (providing a physical barrier from moving motor vehicle traffic).

There are also a variety of bike trails and bike paths in Sacramento, most notably the Jedediah Smith Memorial Trail that runs along the American River, a 32-mile trail closed to motor vehicles.

In Davis, a college town for UC Davis, cycling is incredibly popular. Here, some 23.2% of commuters commute by bicycle, the highest in the nation. This is more than the double the city with the next-highest percentage of bicycle commuters (Berkeley, California, another college town, with 9.7%).

Jump Bikes offers its bicycle-sharing service in both Sacramento and Davis.

== Notable bridges ==
The following notable bridges either sit entirely in the Sacramento metropolitan area, or enter and exit the Sacramento metropolitan area:

Bridge name	Image	Carries	Crosses	Locale	Design	Length	Year opened
Antioch Bridge		2 lanes of SR 160, bicycles and pedestrians	San Joaquin River	Antioch, California and Sacramento County, California	Steel plate girder	9,504 ft. (2,897 m)	1978
Fair Oaks Bridge		bicycles and pedestrians	American River	Sacramento, California	Pratt truss bridge	500 ft.	1909
Foresthill Bridge		Automobiles, bicycles and pedestrians	North Fork American River	North Auburn, California	Deck arch bridge	2,428 ft.	1973
Guy West Bridge		bicycles and pedestrians	American River	Sacramento, California	Suspension bridge	1,144 ft. (349 m)	1967
I Street Bridge		2 lanes of I Street, Union Pacific Railroad, Amtrak, bicycles and pedestrians	Sacramento River	Sacramento, California	Swing bridge	400 ft. (120 m)	1911
Isleton Bridge		SR 160	Sacramento River	Isleton Bridge	Tied-arch and bascule	624 ft. (190 m)	1923
Jibboom Street Bridge		Jibboom Street	American River	Sacramento, California	Truss swing bridge	959 ft. (292 m)	1931
Rio Vista Bridge		2 lanes of SR 12	Sacramento River	Rio Vista, California	Vertical-lift through-truss	2,890 ft. (881 m)	1960
Tower Bridge		Cars, pedestrians, bicycles on 4 lanes of SR 275	Sacramento River	West Sacramento, California and Sacramento, California	Vertical-lift bridge	737 ft. (225 m)	1935
Yolo Causeway		6 lanes of I-80, pedestrians and bicycles	Yolo Bypass	Yolo County, California	Prestressed concrete tee-beam	3.2 mi. (5.1 km)	1962

== Transportation museums ==
The Sacramento metropolitan area has several museums that focus on aspects of transportation:

- Aerospace Museum of California - North Highlands
- California Automobile Museum - Sacramento
- California State Railroad Museum - Sacramento
- Reiff's Antique Gas Station Automotive Museum - Woodland
- Tahoe Maritime Museum - Lake Tahoe
- United States Bicycling Hall of Fame - Davis

== See also ==
- Streetcars in Sacramento
- Sacramento metropolitan area
- Transportation in California
- Transportation in the San Francisco Bay Area
