= California State Route 160 =

State highway in California

State Route 160
- SR 160 highlighted in red; the gap represents the relinquished portion

Route information
- Maintained by Caltrans
- Length: 49.75 mi (80.06 km) Portions of SR 160 have been relinquished to or are otherwise maintained by local or other governments, and are not included in the length.
- History: State highway in 1910 and 1933; became SR 24 in the 1930s and SR 160 in 1964
- Tourist routes: River Road between the Contra Costa–Sacramento county line and the City of Sacramento

Major junctions
- South end: SR 4 in Antioch
- SR 12 near Rio Vista; SR 220 in Walnut Grove; CR J11 in Walnut Grove; CR E9 near Paintersville
- North end: I-80 BL in Sacramento

Location
- Country: United States
- State: California
- Counties: Contra Costa, Sacramento

Highway system
- State highways in California; Interstate; US; State; Scenic; History; Pre‑1964; Unconstructed; Deleted; Freeways
| ← SR 159 | → SR 161 |

State Route 160 (SR 160) is a state highway in the U.S. state of California consisting of two sections. The longer, southern section is a scenic highway through the alluvial plain of the Sacramento River, linking SR 4 in Antioch with Sacramento via the Antioch Bridge. The northern section, separated from the southern by Sacramento city streets, is the North Sacramento Freeway, running from the 16th Street Bridge over the American River to Interstate 80 Business towards Roseville.

This northern section was erroneously deleted from the definition in the Streets and Highways Code in 2003 when the relinquished portion through downtown Sacramento was removed; the segment was restored in a 2010 amendment to the code. Although it is no longer officially part of the state highway system, some maps may still mark the relinquished portion of SR 160 as continuous through the city.

== Route description ==
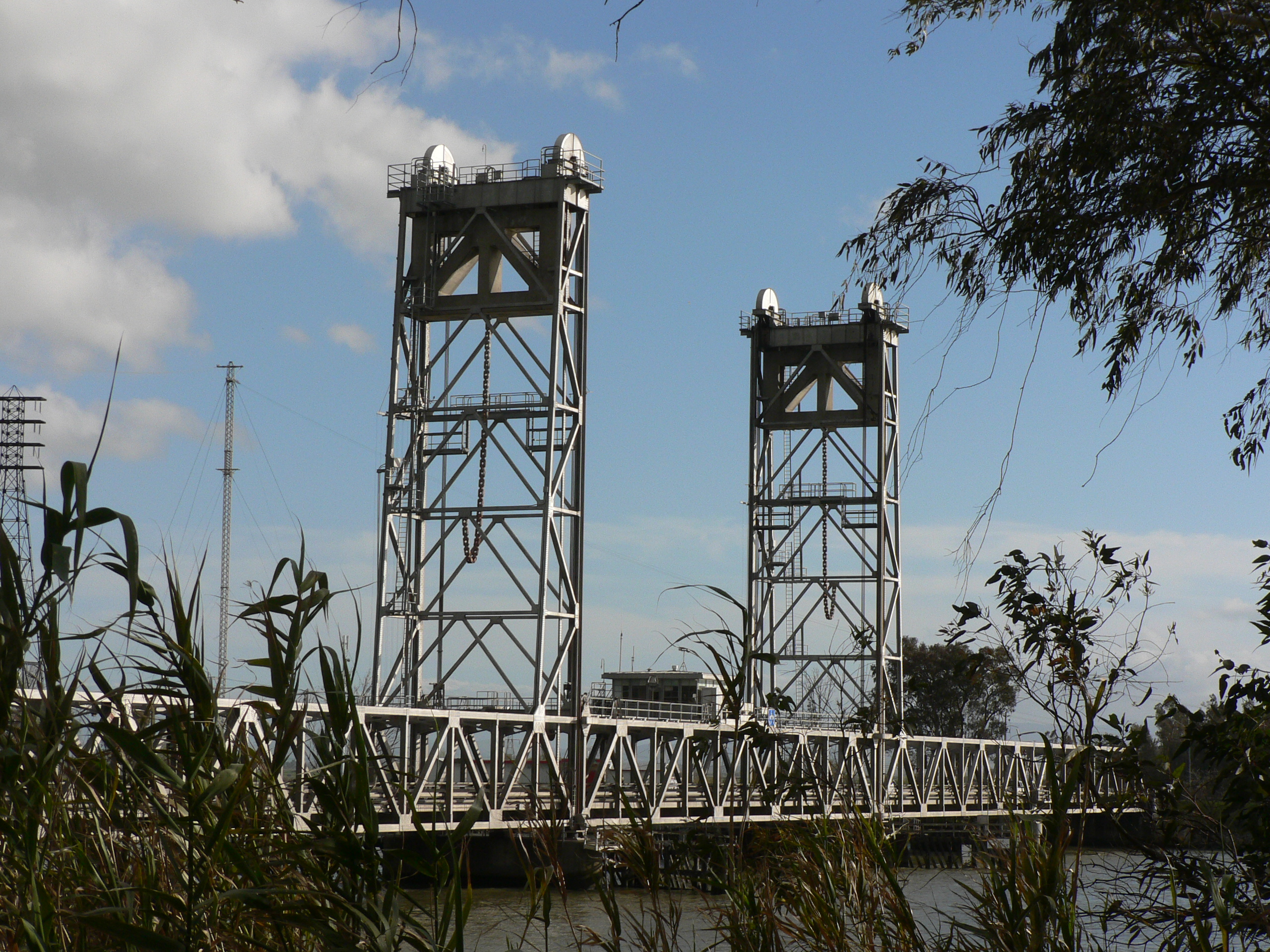
The 1949 Three Mile Slough Bridge, which carries SR 160 over the Three Mile Slough

Route 160 is defined in section 460, subsection (a), of the California Streets and Highways Code:

Route 160 is from:
(1) Route 4 near Antioch to the southern city limits of Sacramento.
(2) The American River in the City of Sacramento to Route 51.

While control of the segment of Route 160 in Sacramento between the southern city limits and the American River was relinquished by the state to the city, subdivision (b) further mandates that the city must still "maintain signs directing motorists to the continuation of Route 160".

State Route 160 begins in eastern Antioch at SR 4 as a four-lane freeway. After two interchanges, SR 160 becomes a two-lane expressway and rises onto the Antioch Bridge over the San Joaquin River. It cuts north across the center of Sherman Island as a two-lane surface road, reaching the Sacramento River on the opposite shore. From there to Sacramento, SR 160 remains near the river, first following the east levee over the 1949 Three Mile Slough Bridge, a lift bridge, across the Three Mile Slough and past Brannan Island State Recreation Area. SR 160 intersects with SR 12 near Rio Vista, right before SR 12 crosses the Sacramento River via the Rio Vista Bridge. After passing Isleton, SR 160 crosses the Sacramento River on the Isleton Bridge, a bascule bridge built in 1923, and runs along the west shore on Grand Island, where it meets the east end of SR 220. The Walnut Grove Bridge carries SR 160 and CR J11 east concurrently across the river to Walnut Grove, and, at the north end of the island, SR 160 crosses the 1924 Steamboat Slough Bridge onto Sutter Island and then the 1923 Paintersville Bridge across the Sacramento River to the mainland, both bascule bridges.

On the mainland, SR 160 once again runs atop the east levee, now 1–2 miles (1.6–3.2 km) west of I-5. The final bridge over the river is the Freeport Bridge, which carries CR E9 to the west levee, where it turns south to return to SR 160 at the west end of the Paintersville Bridge. About 1 mile (1.6 km) beyond the Freeport Bridge, SR 160 leaves the levee, enters the city of Sacramento, where the southern portion of SR 160 ends and state maintenance and control ends. It then passes under I-5 and enters into a more suburban landscape. Here the former SR 160 is known as Freeport Boulevard, a major surface road that passes the Sacramento Executive Airport and Sacramento City College. Freeport Boulevard turns to the northwest at about 4th Avenue. It was formerly a one-way pair with 21st Street with Freeport Boulevard heading one-way southbound and 21st heading one-way northbound. The city converted these streets back to two-way streets for traffic calming purposes in 2008. After a short distance on Broadway, former SR 160 turns north on the one-way pair of 15th (southbound) and 16th (northbound) Streets and enters downtown Sacramento after an interchange with US 50.

15th and 16th Streets lead traffic north past the east side of the State Capitol grounds, which lie between L and N Streets. At F Street, the path of southbound former SR 160 turned west for three blocks on F street before turning north again on 12th Street; both 12th and 16th Streets pass under the Union Pacific Railroad's Martinez Subdivision, where B Street would be, in four-lane subways, but 15th Street meets a dead-end after its intersection with C Street. 12th Street remains a one-way southbound roadway while the two-way SacRT light rail occupies its east side. 12th Street turns northeast at North B Street, and the two directions of former SR 160 come together at Richards Boulevard, just south of the 16th Street Bridge over the American River and the south end of the state-maintained North Sacramento Freeway. The light rail, which crosses the river between the two directions of SR 160, soon leaves at the Del Paso Boulevard interchange as the four-lane freeway turns east, ending at the Capital City Freeway (Interstate 80 Business) at Arden Way, near Arden Fair Mall.

The northern portion is also part of the California Freeway and Expressway System, and so is the piece south of SR 12 near Rio Vista, though only the southernmost piece of SR 12 in Antioch is built to freeway standards. The northern and southern pieces south of SR 12 are also part of the National Highway System, a network of highways that are considered essential to the country's economy, defense, and mobility by the Federal Highway Administration. The entire southern portion from SR 4 to Sacramento is eligible to be included in the State Scenic Highway System and is officially designated as a scenic highway by the California Department of Transportation, meaning that it is a substantial section of highway passing through a "memorable landscape" with no "visual intrusions", where the potential designation has gained popular favor with the community.

== History ==
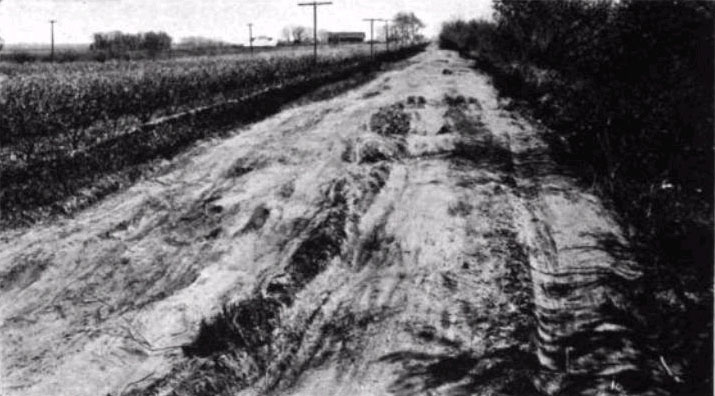

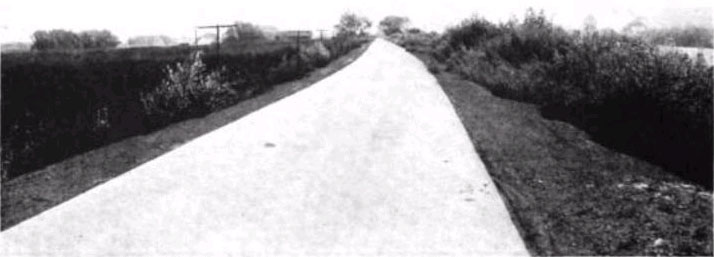
The county road along the Sacramento River levee in 1916 and 1919

In the late 1910s, Sacramento County improved the county road along the levee of the Sacramento River between Sacramento and Rio Vista, which crossed the river twice on free ferries near Paintersville and Isleton. A toll ferry across the San Joaquin River connected Sherman Island, south of Rio Vista, with Antioch, where drivers could head west through the Broadway Tunnel to reach the San Francisco Bay, but the road between Rio Vista and the ferry was poorly paved. In 1922, the Victory Highway Association selected this "Netherlands Route", though locally promoted as the "Netherlands of America", for the Victory Highway west of Sacramento, as it was both shorter than the Lincoln Highway route via Stockton and more scenic. In particular, the river district would "impress [the motorist] with the enormous productive resources of this state as well as supply him with an unmatched scenic drive", and the Broadway Tunnel approach to the bay would bring him "over the Victory Highway to the end of his journey in such a fashion that he will never forget the view spread before him as he first comes into sight of the San Francisco Bay region".

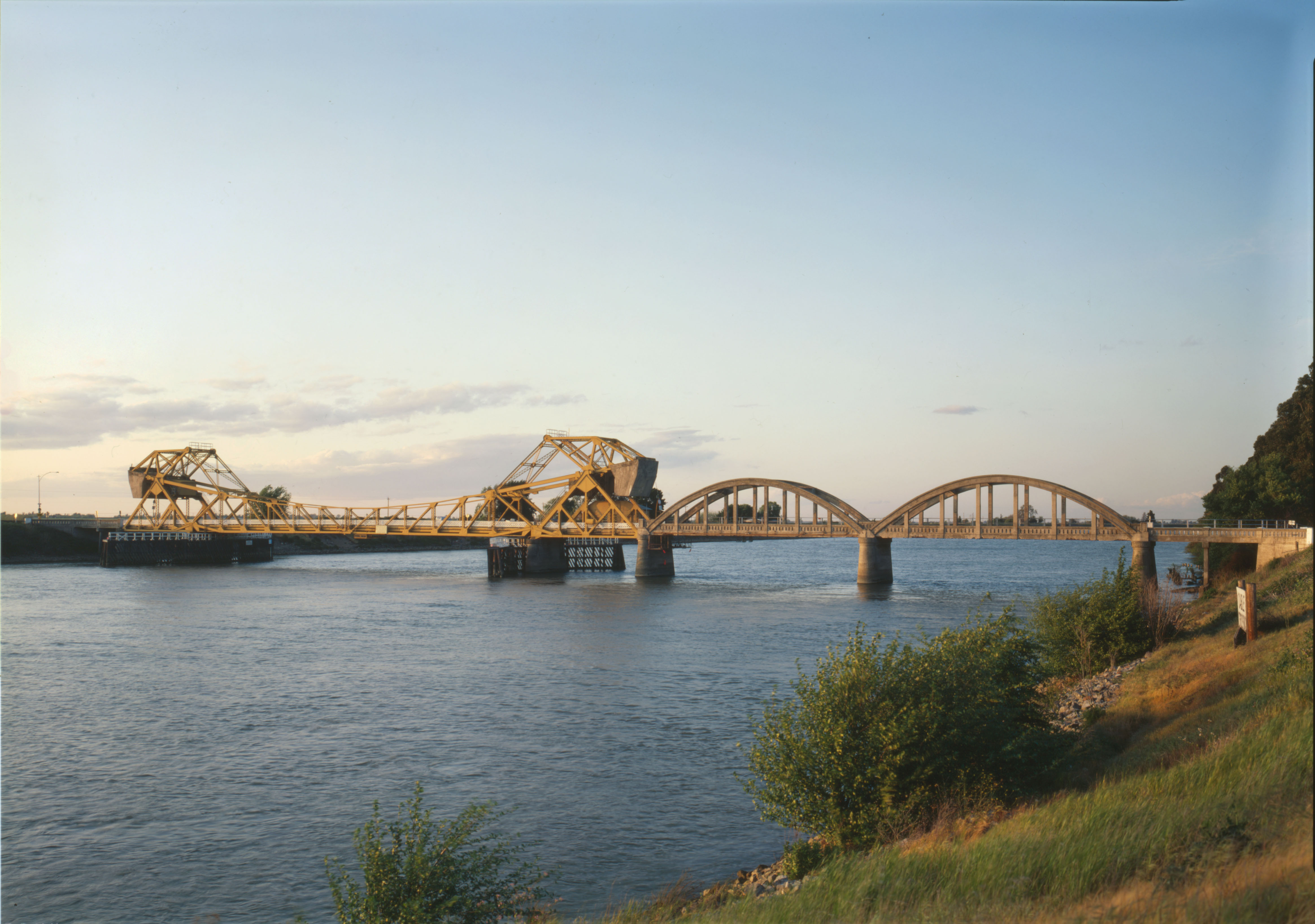
The 1923 Isleton Bridge

Two bascule bridges—the Paintersville Bridge and Isleton Bridge—replaced the free ferries in 1923, and are of a type patented by Joseph B. Strauss, who went on to design the Golden Gate Bridge. Local businessmen Aven Hanford and Oscar Klatt replaced the toll ferry with the tolled Antioch Bridge in mid-1926, almost a year before they opened the larger Carquinez Bridge to the west. The counties of Contra Costa and Sacramento organized a joint highway district in November 1925 to fund an improvement of the northern approach from Rio Vista; the concrete highway was completed in July 1927, creating a fully paved continuous route between Sacramento and the Bay Area.

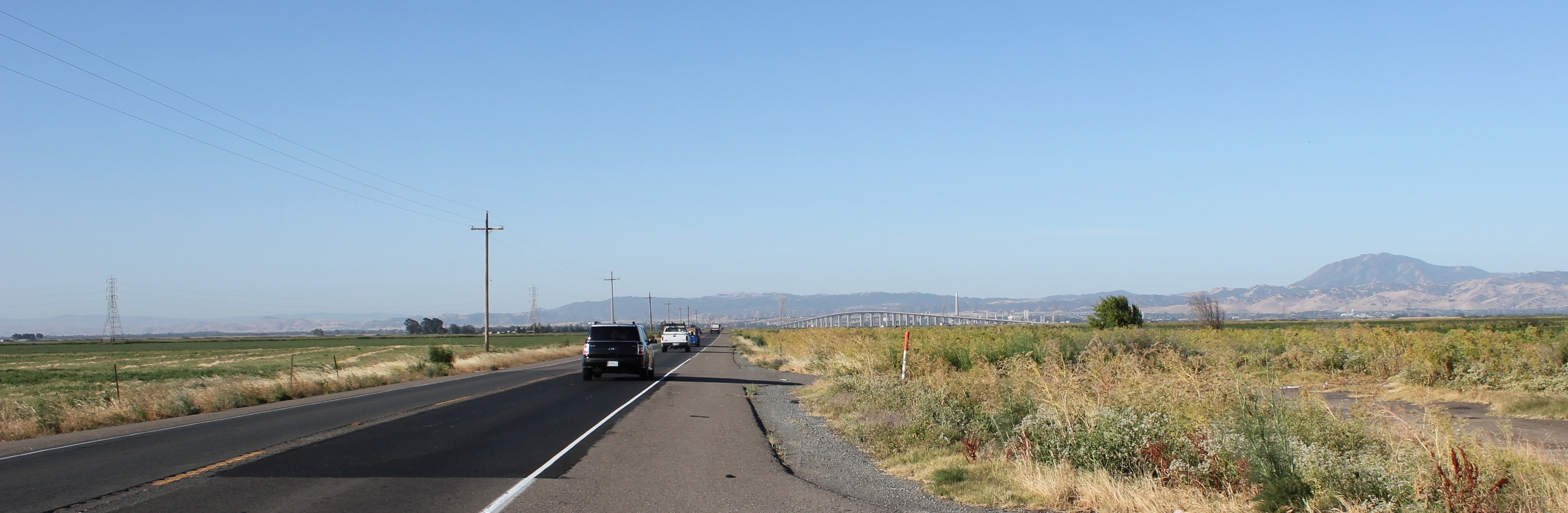
Looking south along SR 160 on Sherman Island. The Antioch Bridge can be seen in the distance as well as Mount Diablo.

The legislature added this road to the state highway system in 1933, and it became part of Legislative Route 11, which had stretched east from Sacramento along US 50. This part of Route 11 was not assigned a sign route number in 1934, but, by 1937, when the new Broadway Low Level Tunnel opened, it was part of Sign Route 24. That route had initially begun at Woodland and traveled northeast and east through the Feather River Canyon, and was extended southeast from Woodland along Sign Route 16 to Sacramento and then south and west via Antioch to the San Francisco – Oakland Bay Bridge approach in Berkeley. The California Freeway and Expressway System was formed in 1959, and included in the planned upgrades was the road between Antioch and Rio Vista. (North of Rio Vista, the present SR 84 was also part of the system.) The entire length was included in the State Scenic Highway System in 1963. In the 1964 renumbering, the Antioch-Sacramento roadway was split between two routes: Route 84 from Antioch to SR 12 near Rio Vista, and Route 160 from SR 12 to Sacramento. However, the entire route was marked as SR 160, and in 1981 the legislative definition was changed to reflect so.

The part of SR 160 through and north of downtown Sacramento began as part of Legislative Route 3, which was added to the state highway system under the first bond issue, passed in 1910, and left the city on the 16th Street Bridge over the American River, following Del Paso Boulevard, El Camino Avenue, and Auburn Boulevard to Roseville. (The short piece from the end of Route 3 near the State Capitol south to Broadway and Freeport Boulevard was Route 4, which followed SR 99 towards Los Angeles.) Route 3 between Sacramento and Roseville was also part of the Victory Highway, and was marked as part of US 40 in 1928 and US 99E in 1929. The North Sacramento Freeway opened on October 6, 1947, bypassing this route from the bridge to Auburn Boulevard near Ben Ali. In 1955, the Elvas Freeway opened from the midpoint of the North Sacramento Freeway to the east side of downtown, and US 99E was moved off the south half of the older North Sacramento Freeway and onto the Elvas Freeway. The North Sacramento Freeway was included in the California Freeway and Expressway System SR 160 in the 1964 renumbering.

By 2000, the city of Sacramento maintained the non-freeway portion of SR 160 within the city limits under a contract with Caltrans. However, since Caltrans's main goal is to move traffic efficiently, the city was not able to carry out pedestrian-friendly projects that they and local residents wanted. Under a law passed in July 1999, Caltrans was authorized to relinquish any part of Route 160 within the city limits to Sacramento. The two agencies agreed, and on October 19, 2000, the portion from the south city limits to the American River became the full responsibility of the city. A 2003 amendment to the Streets and Highways Code erroneously deleted not only this part, but the North Sacramento Freeway as well. A subsequent 2010 amendment corrected the mistake by adding the line, "The American River in the City of Sacramento to Route 51".

A project to convert the former southbound-only Richards Boulevard access just south of the American River to a standard signalized intersection was completed in August 2007; this improves access to existing and future development in the area, including redevelopment of a former rail yard, while slowing northbound traffic heading for the bridge and freeway. Another project converting Freeport Boulevard and 21st Street south of Broadway into two-way streets was also completed. 21st Street has carried northbound traffic since 1974, when Caltrans took it over. It is designed to calm traffic while improving the intersection at the south end of the former one-way pair, which the SacRT light rail now crosses 21st Street just to the north of. In addition, the three blocks of F Street that carried southbound SR 160 from 12th Street to 15th Street have been calmed by the addition of a roundabout at 13th Street.

In 2012, SR 4 was re-routed to go further south to bypass Oakley and Brentwood. The southern end of SR 160 was then extended south to cover the part of the freeway that is no longer designated as SR 4, from Main Street, where SR 4 originally exited the freeway, to the fork of the new SR 4 (formerly known as the State Route 4 Bypass, or Bypass Road).

In 2014, construction began at the interchange with SR 4 to complete the two remaining ramps that would link southbound SR 160 to eastbound and westbound SR 4 to northbound SR 160. Construction was completed in March 2016.

In 2025, the Sacramento City Council approved a $1.2 million fund for a new project aimed at reconnecting the area north of the northern portion of SR 160 (North Sacramento Freeway) to Downtown Sacramento. It is aimed to help connect the two areas and reduce traffic. The project is funded with a $1 million federal capital grant and $200,000 from the Vision Zero Safety Program.

== Major intersections ==
Except where prefixed with a letter, postmiles were measured on the road as it was in 1964, based on the alignment as it existed at that time, and do not necessarily reflect current mileage. Postmile prefixes include: R reflecting a realignment in the route since then, M indicating a second realignment, L referring to an overlap due to a correction or change, and T indicating postmiles classified as temporary. Segments that remain unconstructed or have been relinquished to local control may be omitted. The numbers reset at county lines; the start and end postmiles in each county are given in the county column.

| County | Location | Postmile | Exit | Destinations | Notes |
|---|---|---|---|---|---|
| Contra Costa; CC L0.00-1.33 | Antioch | L0.00 | — | SR 4 east – Stockton | Southern end of SR 160; SR 4 exit 30 |
| Contra Costa; CC L0.00-1.33 | Antioch | L0.00 | — | SR 4 west – Martinez, Oakland | Southern end of SR 160; SR 4 exit 30 |
| Contra Costa; CC L0.00-1.33 | Antioch | 0.00 | 1A | Main Street, East 18th Street – Downtown Oakley | Former exit 1B southbound; former SR 4 east |
| Contra Costa; CC L0.00-1.33 | Antioch | 0.49 | 1B | Wilbur Avenue | Former exits 1 northbound and 1C southbound; last free exit for northbound traffic |
| Contra Costa; CC L0.00-1.33 | Antioch | | Northern end of freeway | | |
| San Joaquin River | | 1.33– L0.00 | Antioch Bridge (northbound toll only) | | |
| Sacramento; SAC L0.00-47.05 | | L6.98 | Three Mile Slough Bridge over Three Mile Slough | | |
| Sacramento; SAC L0.00-47.05 | | L10.78 0.00 | | SR 12 – Lodi, Rio Vista | |
| Sacramento; SAC L0.00-47.05 | | 5.95 | Isleton Bridge over Sacramento River | | |
| Sacramento; SAC L0.00-47.05 | Ryde | 11.46 | | SR 220 – Hogback Island | Eastern terminus of SR 220 |
| Sacramento; SAC L0.00-47.05 | Walnut Grove | 14.16 | | CR J11 (Walnut Grove Bridge) – Locke, Thornton, Stockton | Western terminus of CR J11 |
| Sacramento; SAC L0.00-47.05 | | 19.76 | Steamboat Slough Bridge over Steamboat Slough | | |
| Sacramento; SAC L0.00-47.05 | | 20.87 | | CR E9 (Sutter Slough Bridge Road) | Southern terminus of CR E9 |
| Sacramento; SAC L0.00-47.05 | | 20.98 | Paintersville Bridge over Sacramento River | | |
| Sacramento; SAC L0.00-47.05 | | 34.07 | | Freeport Bridge (CR E9) – Clarksburg | Northern terminus of CR E9 |
| Sacramento; SAC L0.00-47.05 | Sacramento | 35.05 | North end of southern segment of SR 160 at Sacramento south city limit | | |
| Sacramento; SAC L0.00-47.05 | Sacramento | 35.05 | | Freeport Boulevard | Continuation beyond the Sacramento city limits; former SR 24 / SR 160 north; access to I-5 is via Pocket Road |
| Sacramento; SAC L0.00-47.05 | Sacramento | Gap in route | | | |
| Sacramento; SAC L0.00-47.05 | Sacramento | R44.37 | | North 12th Street | Continuation beyond Richards Boulevard; former US 40 west / SR 160 south; northbound entrance accessible from North 16th Street |
| Sacramento; SAC L0.00-47.05 | Sacramento | R44.37 | | Richards Boulevard | Connects to I-5 |
| Sacramento; SAC L0.00-47.05 | Sacramento | R44.46 | South end of northern segment of SR 160; Southern end of freeway | | |
| Sacramento; SAC L0.00-47.05 | Sacramento | R44.46 | 16th Street Bridge over American River | | |
| Sacramento; SAC L0.00-47.05 | Sacramento | R44.62 | 46A | Northgate Boulevard | Northbound exit and southbound entrance |
| Sacramento; SAC L0.00-47.05 | Sacramento | R44.98 | 46B | Del Paso Boulevard | Northbound left exit and southbound entrance; former US 40 east |
| Sacramento; SAC L0.00-47.05 | Sacramento | 45.60 | 47A | Leisure Lane, Canterbury Road | |
| Sacramento; SAC L0.00-47.05 | Sacramento | 46.16 | 47B | Exposition Boulevard, Royal Oaks Drive | Exposition Boulevard not signed southbound |
| Sacramento; SAC L0.00-47.05 | Sacramento | 46.33 | — | Tribute Road | Northbound entrance only; serves traffic from Exposition Boulevard to I-80 BL east because there is no direct ramp |
| Sacramento; SAC L0.00-47.05 | Sacramento | 46.58 | 48 | Arden Way | Northbound exit and southbound entrance |
| Sacramento; SAC L0.00-47.05 | Sacramento | 47.05 | — | I-80 BL east (Capital City Freeway) – Reno | Northbound exit and southbound entrance; no access to I‑80 BL west; former US 99E north / I-80 east; northern end of SR 160; I‑80 BL west exit 9B |
| Sacramento; SAC L0.00-47.05 | Sacramento | 1.000 mi = 1.609 km; 1.000 km = 0.621 mi: Electronic toll collection; Incomplete access | | | |

== See also ==
- Transportation in the Sacramento metropolitan area
