= Victory Eagle =

The Victory Eagle is a bronze sculpture designed to honor the veterans and casualties of World War I. Although the artist is not known, noted ornithologists Thomas Roberts and Otto Widmann consulted on its development. The statue depicts an eagle with its wings spread protectively over two young eaglets in a nest, symbolizing the United States' protection of its citizens. Although they were originally mounted on stone bases, all have since been moved from their original locations.

Produced in the early 1920s, the monuments were meant to mark each county line along the Victory Highway as it crossed the United States. In the original design, two eagles would mark each crossing—one on each side of the road—to form a chain of monuments from coast to coast. At the terminals in San Francisco and New York, huge groups of eagles would be mounted on bases along with bronze statues of a soldier, a sailor, and a Red Cross nurse. However, the statues had to be paid for through private funding, and the plan eventually fell apart when the Great Depression began. Only six monuments were ever installed.

== Present locations ==
- Lawrence, Kansas (originally at the Douglas–Leavenworth County line, rededicated at University of Kansas in 1982 and 2019)
- Topeka, Kansas in Gage Park (relocated from the Shawnee–Douglas County line)
- Wamego, Kansas
- Truckee, California (relocated from the California–Nevada border)
- Sacramento, California
- Antioch, California (originally in Oakley, California; moved in 1976)

== Gallery ==
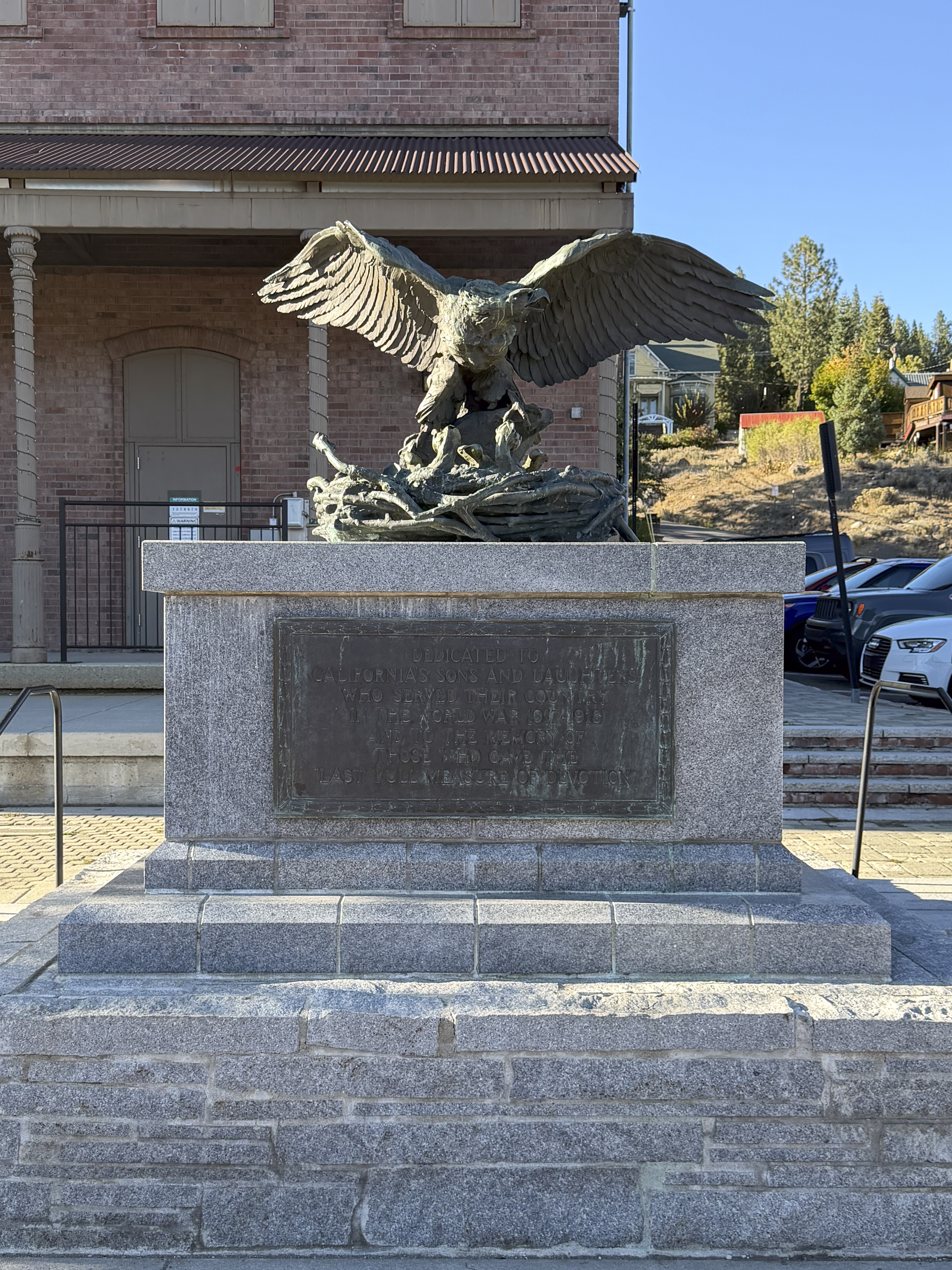
Victory Eagle monument (front) in Truckee, CA

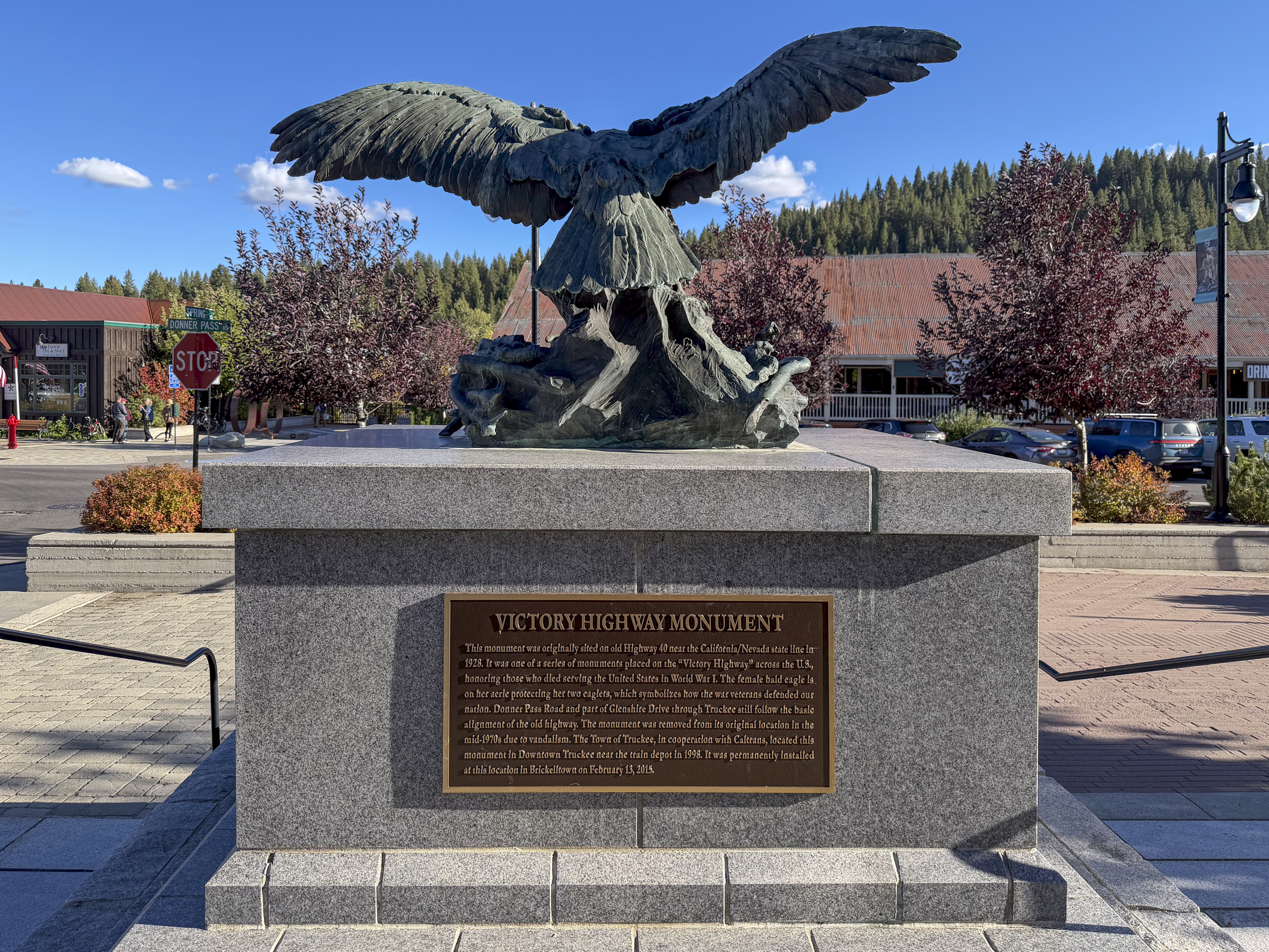
Victory Eagle monument (back) in Truckee, CA
