= Victory Highway =

Auto trail across the United States

Victory Highway

Route information
- Existed: 1921–1938

Major junctions
- West end: San Francisco, California
- East end: New York, New York

Location
- Country: United States

Highway system
- Auto trails

The Victory Highway was an auto trail across the United States between New York, New York and San Francisco, California, roughly equivalent to the present U.S. Route 40. It was created by the Victory Highway Association, which was organized in 1921 to locate and mark a transcontinental highway to be dedicated to American forces who died in World War I. A series of Victory Eagle sculptures were planned to mark the route, although only a few were actually built and placed.

By 1922 the organization had decided to run the highway from New York City southwest to Camden, New Jersey; Philadelphia; Wilmington, Delaware; Baltimore; and Washington, D.C. before turning west to San Francisco. Washington was later removed from the route, and the highway was relocated to run west from Baltimore to Cumberland, Maryland. At Cumberland, it picked up the old National Road to Vandalia, Illinois, which was already marked as part of the National Old Trails Road. It continued to follow that auto trail near Fulton, Missouri, and then followed a different route across the rest of that state, passing through Jefferson City on its way to Kansas City. The highway continued west from Kansas City to Denver over the Golden Belt Highway, and then ran via Salt Lake City, across the Great Salt Lake Desert on the Wendover Cut-off and into Nevada. After crossing the Sierra Nevada mountain range into California, the highway went through Sacramento, through the Sacramento–San Joaquin River Delta over what is now State Route 160, crossed over the Antioch Bridge, passed through the Broadway Tunnel, and ended in San Francisco.

The Victory Highway mostly overlapped the National Old Trails Road east of St. Louis, but it took a different route through New Jersey. While the National Old Trails Road crossed the Delaware River at Trenton, the Victory Highway crossed on the Benjamin Franklin Bridge to Camden, heading northeast via Burlington and Hightstown to Perth Amboy roughly on the present U.S. Route 130 and Middlesex County Route 615. After crossing the Victory Bridge into Perth Amboy, it turned east over the Outerbridge Crossing and through Staten Island to the Staten Island Ferry to Manhattan. After the Outerbridge Crossing was completed in 1928, the only two ferries remaining on the highway were the Staten Island Ferry and a ferry between San Francisco and Oakland at the other end.

When the United States Numbered Highways system was introduced in 1926, the Victory Highway route was supplanted mostly by U.S. 40. The Victory Highway Association continued to promote tourism along the route, but as the importance of named highways declined, the association renamed itself the U.S. Highway 40 Association in 1938.

== See also ==
- Victory Boulevard - name given to a number of streets in honor of the outcome of World War I, especially:
  - Victory Boulevard (Los Angeles)
  - Victory Boulevard (Staten Island)
- Rhode Island Route 102, a route in Rhode Island with a portion that has the same name.
- Reno Arch - Originally built to celebrate the completion of the highway
