= Courtland, California =

- Unincorporated community Census-designated place
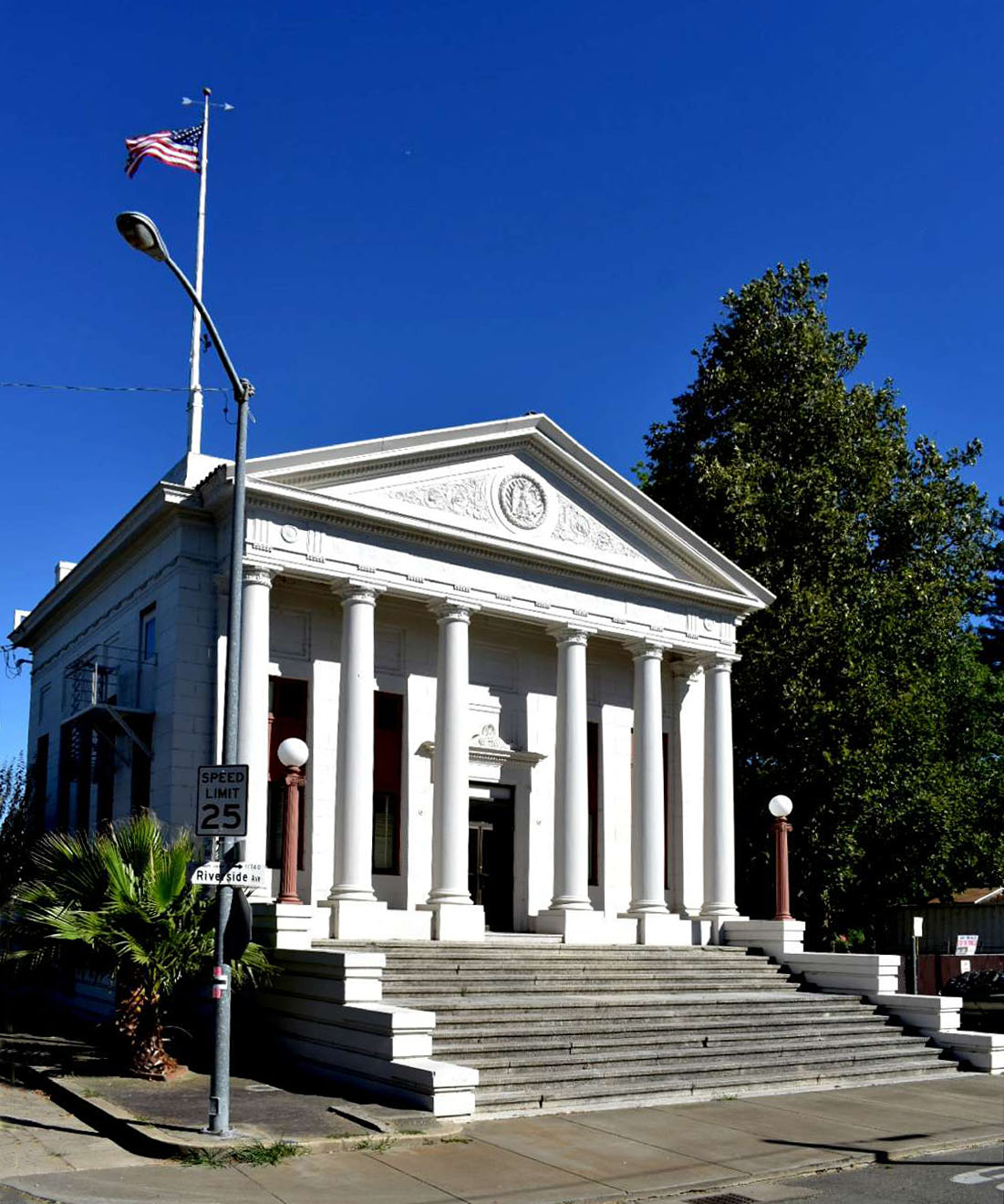
- Abandoned bank building in Courtland

- Location of Courtland in Sacramento County, California.

- Location within California Location within the United States
- Coordinates: 38°19′52″N 121°34′07″W
- Country: United States
- State: California
- County: Sacramento

Area
  - Total: 1.80 sq mi (4.66 km^{2})
  - Land: 1.80 sq mi (4.66 km^{2})
  - Water: 0 sq mi (0.00 km^{2}) 0%
- Elevation: 13 ft (4.0 m)

Population (2020)
  - Total: 326
  - Density: 181.1/sq mi (69.93/km^{2})
- Time zone: UTC-8 (Pacific (PST))
  - Summer (DST): UTC-7 (PDT)
- ZIP code: 95615
- Area codes: Area codes 916 and 279
- GNIS feature ID: 1655931

Courtland is an unincorporated community in Sacramento County, California, United States. Courtland is located along the Sacramento River, 17 miles (27 km) south-southwest of Sacramento. Courtland has a post office with ZIP code 95615, which was established in 1872. As of the 2020 census, Courtland had a population of 326. Courtland was named after Courtland Sims, son of James V. Sims, a landowner who opened a steamer landing in the community in 1870. For statistical purposes, the United States Census Bureau has defined that community as a census-designated place (CDP).

== Geography ==
According to the United States Census Bureau, the CDP covers an area of 1.8 square miles (4.7 km^{2}), all land.

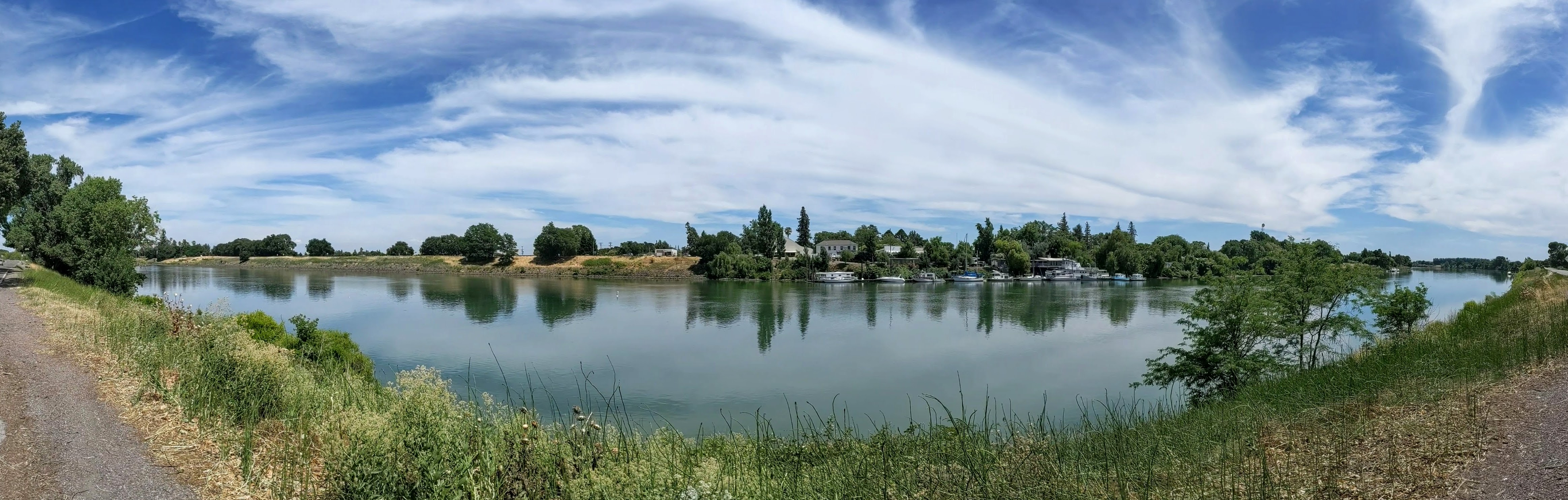
Panoramic view of Courtland from Route 160 in Yolo County, across the Sacramento River

== Demographics ==
Historical population
Census	Pop.	Note	%±
2010	355		—
2020	326		−8.2%
U.S. Decennial Census; 1850–1870 1880-1890; 1900 1910 1920; 1930 1940 1950; 1960 1970 1980; 1990 2000 2010

Courtland first appeared as a census designated place in the 2010 U.S. census.

=== 2020 census ===
As of the 2020 census, Courtland had a population of 326, with a population density of 181.1 inhabitants per square mile (69.9/km^{2}). The median age was 39.5 years. The age distribution was 84 people (25.8%) under the age of 18, 15 people (4.6%) aged 18 to 24, 92 people (28.2%) aged 25 to 44, 76 people (23.3%) aged 45 to 64, and 59 people (18.1%) who were 65 years of age or older. For every 100 females, there were 106.3 males; for every 100 females age 18 and over, there were 114.2 males age 18 and over. The entire population lived in rural areas, with 0.0% of residents in urban areas.

The whole population lived in households. There were 123 households, of which 30.9% had children under the age of 18 living in them. Of all households, 56.1% were married-couple households, 3.3% were cohabiting couple households, 32.5% had a female householder with no partner present, and 8.1% had a male householder with no partner present. About 28.5% of all households were made up of individuals, and 13.8% had someone living alone who was 65 years of age or older. The average household size was 2.65. There were 86 families (69.9% of all households).

There were 140 housing units at an average density of 77.8 units per square mile (30.0 units/km^{2}), of which 123 (87.9%) were occupied. Of these, 63 (51.2%) were owner-occupied, and 60 (48.8%) were occupied by renters. The homeowner vacancy rate was 0.0% and the rental vacancy rate was 6.3%.

Racial composition as of the 2020 census
Race	Number	Percent
White	151	46.3%
Black or African American	0	0.0%
American Indian and Alaska Native	1	0.3%
Asian	8	2.5%
Native Hawaiian and Other Pacific Islander	1	0.3%
Some other race	115	35.3%
Two or more races	50	15.3%
Hispanic or Latino (of any race)	176	54.0%

== Pear Fair ==
Courtland hosts the annual Pear Fair, celebrating the delta's Bartlett pear harvest, a tradition since 1972. The 2020 Pear Fair was cancelled due to the Covid-19 crisis.
