= Paintersville, California =

Unincorporated community in California, United States

- Unincorporated community
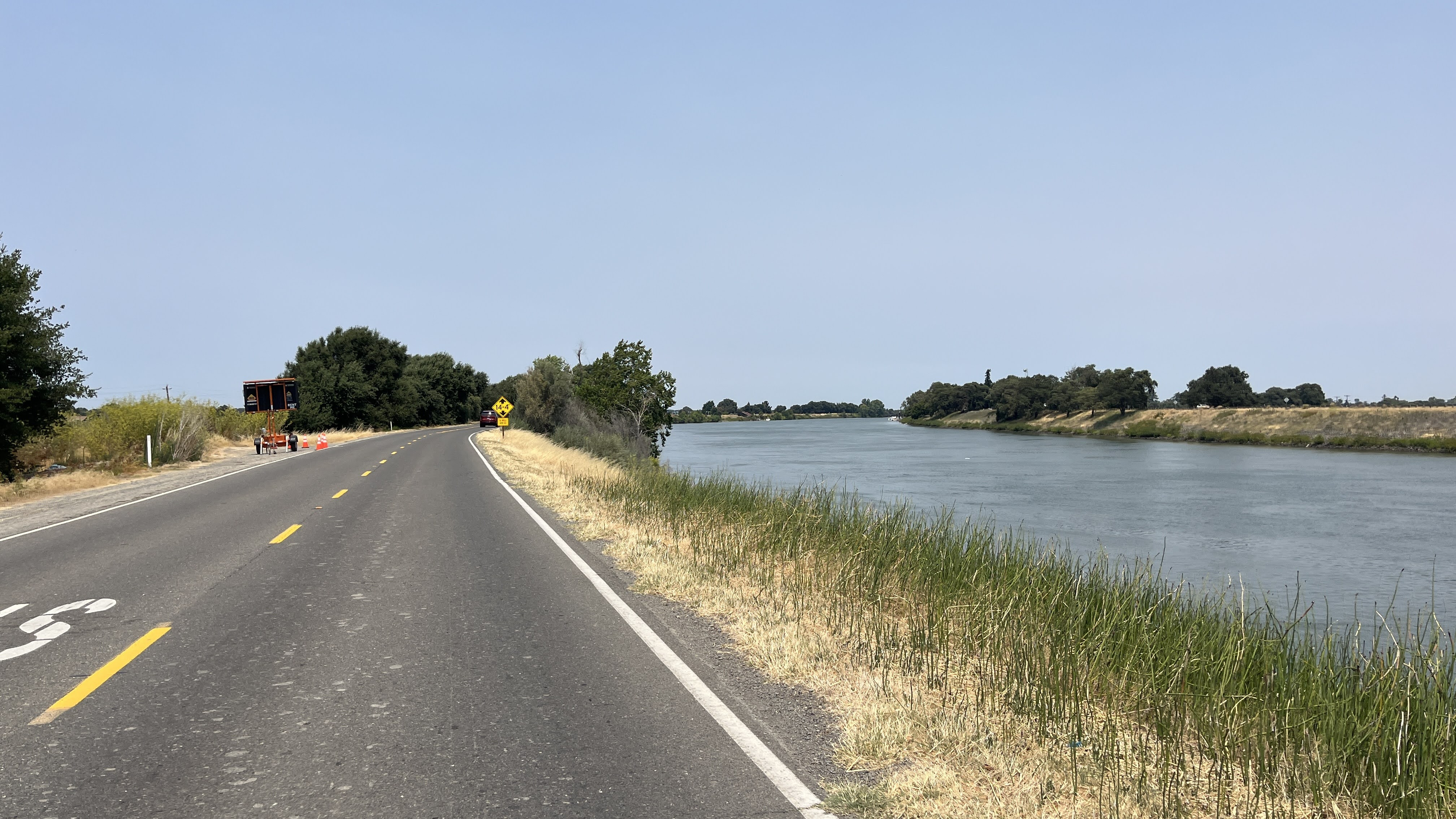
- The Sacramento River, near Paintersville

- Location within California Location within the United States
- Coordinates: 38°19′12″N 121°34′34″W
- Country: United States
- State: California
- County: Sacramento
- Elevation: 16 ft (4.9 m)
- Time zone: UTC-8 (Pacific (PST))
  - Summer (DST): UTC-7 (PDT)
- Area codes: 916, 279
- GNIS feature ID: 252759

Paintersville is an unincorporated community in Sacramento County, California, United States. Paintersville is located along the Sacramento River and California State Route 160, less than 1 mile (1.6 km) south-southwest of Courtland. The community is named after Levi Painter, who laid out lots in the community in 1879.
