= Sutter Island =

Island in California

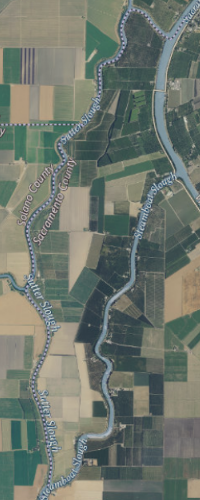
- USGS aerial imagery of Sutter Island

- Location within Sacramento-San Joaquin River Delta Location within California Location within the United States

Geography
- Location: Northern California
- Coordinates: 38°17′37″N 121°35′32″W
- Adjacent to: Sacramento River

Administration
- United States
- State: California
- County: Sacramento

Sutter Island (formerly Schoolcraft Island) is a small island of the Sacramento River in California. It is bordered by the Sacramento River on the northeast, Steamboat Slough to the southeast, and Sutter Slough to the west. It is located across the Sacramento River from Paintersville. It is part of Sacramento County, and managed by Reclamation District 349. Its coordinates are 38°17′37″N 121°35′32″W. It is shown, labeled "Schoolcraft Island", on an 1850 survey map of the San Francisco Bay area made by Cadwalader Ringgold and an 1854 map of the area by Henry Lange.
