= Isleton Bridge =

Bridge in the United States

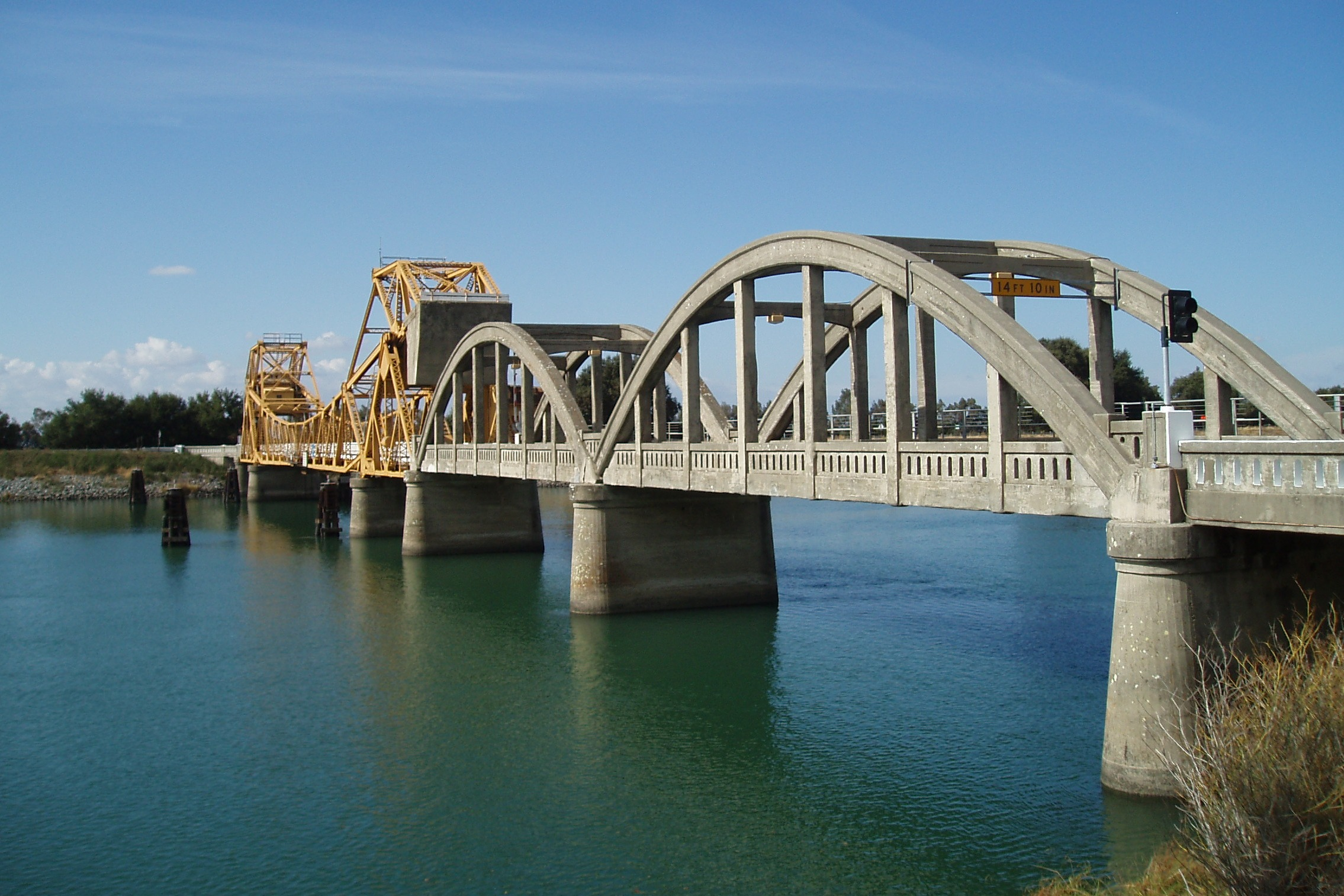
- Isleton Bridge in 2007
- Coordinates: 38°10′19″N 121°35′38″W
- Carries: 2 lanes of SR 160
- Crosses: Sacramento River
- Locale: Isleton, California
- Maintained by: Caltrans

Characteristics
- Design: Tied arch and bascule
- Material: Concrete, steel
- Total length: 624 feet (190 m)
- Width: 18 feet (5.5 m)
- Height: 21 feet (6.4 m)
- Longest span: 226 feet (69 m)
- No. of spans: 9
- Piers in water: 8
- Clearance above: 14.8 feet (4.5 m)

History
- Designer: Charles W. Deterding and Joseph Strauss
- Constructed by: Jenkins & Elton
- Construction end: 1923

Isleton Bridge is a historic bascule bridge carrying California State Route 160 across the Sacramento River north of Isleton, California, built in 1923. There are two concrete tied arch spans, each 102 feet (31 m) long, to the east of the main bascule span, which is 226 feet (69 m) long, and four concrete girder spans. The bridge was designed by Sacramento County engineer Charles W. Deterding, with the Strauss Bascule Bridge Company of Chicago designing the bascule span. Steel portions of the bridge were fabricated by the American Bridge Company and the bridge was constructed by Jenkins & Elton of Sacramento.

== See also ==
- List of bridges documented by the Historic American Engineering Record in California
- List of crossings of the Sacramento River
