= Antioch Bridge =

Bridge on the San Joaquin River

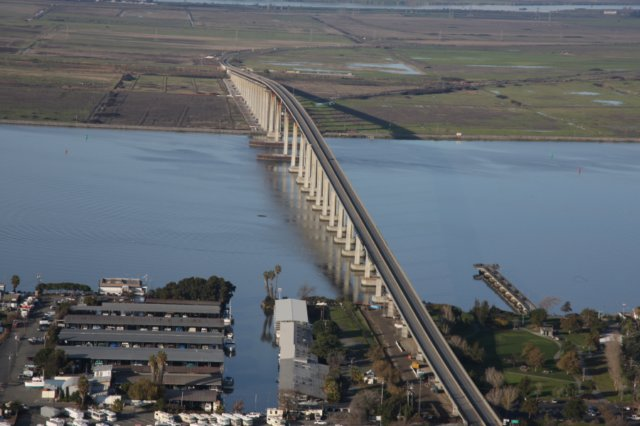
- Aerial view of the Antioch Bridge in 2011
- Coordinates: 38.0244°N 121.7506°W
- Carries: 2 lanes of SR 160; Bicycles and pedestrians
- Crosses: San Joaquin River
- Locale: Antioch and Sacramento County, California, U.S.
- Official name: Senator John A. Nejedly Bridge
- Owner: State of California
- Maintained by: California Department of Transportation and the Bay Area Toll Authority
- ID number: NBI 28 0009

Characteristics
- Design: Steel plate girder
- Total length: 9,504 ft (1.8 mi; 2.9 km)
- Width: 38.1 ft (11.6 m)
- Longest span: 460 ft (140 m)
- Clearance below: 135 ft (41 m)

History
- Opened: December 1978; 47 years ago
- Replaces: 1926 lift bridge

Statistics
- Daily traffic: 13,600 (2009)
- Toll: Northbound only; FasTrak or pay-by-plate, cash not accepted; Effective January 1 – December 31, 2026: $8.50; $4.25 (carpool rush hours, FasTrak only)

Location
- Interactive map of Antioch Bridge

The Antioch Bridge (officially the Senator John A. Nejedly Bridge) is an automobile, bicycle, and pedestrian bridge in the western United States. Located in northern California, it crosses the San Joaquin River-Stockton Deepwater Shipping Channel, linking Antioch in Contra Costa County with Sherman Island in southern Sacramento County, near Rio Vista.

Named after state senator John Nejedly, the bridge is signed as part of State Route 160. Unlike other toll bridges in California, it has only a single lane of traffic for each direction. It is one of several bridges in the Bay area that are traversable by pedestrians and bicyclists in addition to automobiles. The current bridge was completed 48 years ago in 1978, is 1.8 miles (2.9 km) in length, and opened to traffic that December.

== History ==
=== 1926 toll bridge ===
The original structure was completed in 1926 by the American Toll Bridge Company (Aven Hanford and Oscar Klatt), who went on to build the original span of the Carquinez Bridge. The bridge was opened on 1 January 1926 as a connecting link on the coast-to-coast Victory Highway. Hanford and Klatt, officials with the Rodeo-Vallejo Ferry Company, had organized the American Toll Bridge Company in 1923, which built the bridge at a cost of greater than US$2,000,000 (equivalent to $37,790,000 in 2025).

The Delta Bridge corporation had formed in December 1922, but did not complete a bridge at Antioch. Delta Bridge had received a franchise to build in June 1923.

The 1926 bridge featured two spans each 270 feet (82 m) long which provided a clearance of 70 feet (21 m) below when opened. The original lift span bridge was plagued with problems throughout its lifetime. Heavy traffic could cross it at no more than 15 miles per hour (24 km/h), and its narrow shipping channel led to collisions with freighters in 1958, 1963, and 1970.

=== State purchase ===
In 1937, Assemblyman Earl D. Desmond urged the California Toll Bridge Authority to acquire the Antioch Bridge. Desmond believed that by purchasing the bridge, tolls could be eliminated, which would spur economic growth. Director Frank W. Clark negotiated with the American Toll Bridge Company, and the state of California acquired ownership of both the Antioch and Carquinez Bridges at a cost of US$5,943,000 (equivalent to $136,580,000 in 2025) on September 16, 1940. Tolls were reduced immediately and further reduced in 1942.

=== Marine traffic collisions ===
The narrow ship channel afforded by the raised span led to marine traffic colliding with the bridge in 1958 (rammed by Kaimana), 1963 (rammed by Pasadena) and 1970 (rammed by Washington Bear).

The 1970 collision spurred efforts to build a replacement bridge. In that incident, the lift span was stuck in the raised position. The bridge tender could not leave the bridge and remained in the control house for 20 hours. Local firemen eventually made their way to him and brought him out. The bridge was closed for repairs for 5 months.

=== 1978 replacement bridge ===
Sen. Nejedly authored Senate Bill 25, which later became Chapter 765 of the California Statutes of 1972, authorizing the issuance of revenue bonds to fund the construction of a replacement to the existing bridge. The bill cited the recent extended disruptions in bridge service from marine traffic damage as well as flooding of the approaches.

The high-level bridge opened in December 1978. Shortly before completion, the replacement bridge was named to honor Sen. Nejedly.

== Tolls ==
Tolls are only collected from northbound traffic headed to Sacramento County at the toll plaza on Antioch side of the bridge. All-electronic tolling has been in effect since 2020, and drivers may either pay using the FasTrak electronic toll collection device or using the license plate tolling program. It remains not truly an open road tolling system until the remaining unused toll booths are removed, forcing drivers to slow substantially from freeway speeds while passing through. Effective January 1 – December 31, 2026, the toll rate for passenger cars is $8.50. During peak traffic hours on weekdays between 5:00 am and 10:00 am, and between 3:00 pm and 7:00 pm, carpool vehicles carrying three or more people or motorcycles may pay a discounted toll of $4.25 if they use the designated carpool lane with a FasTrak Flex transponder with its switch set to indicate the number of the vehicle's occupants (1, 2, or 3+). Two-person carpools may still use the carpool lane but will still be charged the full toll. Drivers without Fastrak or a license plate account must open and pay via a "short term" account within 48 hours after crossing the bridge or they will be sent an invoice of the unpaid toll. No additional toll violation penalty will be assessed if the invoice is paid within 21 days.

=== Historical toll rates ===
Crossing the original 1926 bridge required a toll, but tolls were removed in 1945 after the state bought the bridge in 1940. Under the ownership of the American Toll Bridge company, in 1940, tolls were 45 cents per car (equivalent to $10.34 in 2025) plus five cents (equivalent to $1.15 in 2025) per passenger. After the state took ownership, tolls were immediately reduced to thirty cents per car (equivalent to $6.89 in 2025) for up to four passengers. In 1942, tolls were further reduced to 25 cents per car (equivalent to $4.93 in 2025). then removed three years later. Tolls were reinstated in 1978 with the completion of the new span at fifty cents per car (equivalent to $2.47 in 2025), collected northbound only.

The basic toll (for automobiles) on the seven state-owned bridges, including the Antioch Bridge, was standardized to $1 by Regional Measure 1, approved by Bay Area voters in 1988 (equivalent to $2.72 in 2025). A $1 seismic retrofit surcharge was added in 1998 by the state legislature, increasing the toll to $2 (equivalent to $3.95 in 2025), originally for eight years, but since then extended to December 2037 (AB1171, October 2001). On March 2, 2004, voters approved Regional Measure 2 to fund various transportation improvement projects, raising the toll by another dollar to $3 (equivalent to $5.11 in 2025). An additional dollar was added to the toll starting January 1, 2007, to cover cost overruns on the eastern span replacement of the Bay Bridge, increasing the toll to $4 (equivalent to $6.21 in 2025).

The Metropolitan Transportation Commission (MTC), a regional transportation agency, in its capacity as the Bay Area Toll Authority, administers RM1 and RM2 funds, a significant portion of which are allocated to public transit capital improvements and operating subsidies in the transportation corridors served by the bridges. Caltrans administers the "second dollar" seismic surcharge, and receives some of the MTC-administered funds to perform other maintenance work on the bridges. The state legislature created the Bay Area Toll Authority in 1997 to transfer the toll administration of the seven state-owned bridges to the MTC. The Bay Area Toll Authority is made up of appointed officials put in place by various city and county governments, and is not subject to direct voter oversight.

Due to further funding shortages for seismic retrofit projects, the Bay Area Toll Authority again raised tolls on all seven of the state-owned bridges in July 2010. The toll rate for autos on the Antioch Bridge was thus increased to $5 (equivalent to $7.38 in 2025).

In June 2018, Bay Area voters approved Regional Measure 3 to further raise the tolls on all seven of the state-owned bridges to fund $4.5 billion worth of transportation improvements in the area. Under the passed measure, the toll rate for autos on the Antioch Bridge was increased to $6 on January 1, 2019; to $7 on January 1, 2022; and then to $8 on January 1, 2025.

In September 2019, the MTC approved a $4 million plan to eliminate toll takers and convert all seven of the state-owned bridges to all-electronic tolling, citing that 80 percent of drivers are now using Fastrak and the change would improve traffic flow. On March 20, 2020, accelerated by the COVID-19 pandemic, all-electronic tolling was placed in effect for all seven state-owned toll bridges. The MTC then installed new systems at all seven bridges to make them permanently cashless by the start of 2021. In April 2022, the Bay Area Toll Authority announced plans to remove all remaining unused toll booths and create an open-road tolling system which functions at highway speeds.

The Bay Area Toll Authority then approved a plan in December 2024 to implement 50-cent annual toll increases on all seven state-owned bridges between 2026 and 2030 to help pay for bridge maintenance. The standard toll rate for autos will thus rise to $8.50 on January 1, 2026; $9 in 2027; $9.50 in 2028; $10 in 2029; and then to $10.50 in 2030. And becoming effective in 2027, a 25-cent surcharge will be added to any toll charged to a license plate account, and a 50-cent surcharge added to a toll violation invoice, due to the added cost of processing these payment methods.

== Animal incidents ==
In 1965, three circus lions escaped from a truck passing over the Antioch Bridge. Two were quickly recaptured, but one drowned after falling into the river.

Humphrey the Whale was stranded near the Antioch Bridge in 1985.
