= Joseph Strauss (engineer) =

American structural engineer (1870–1938)

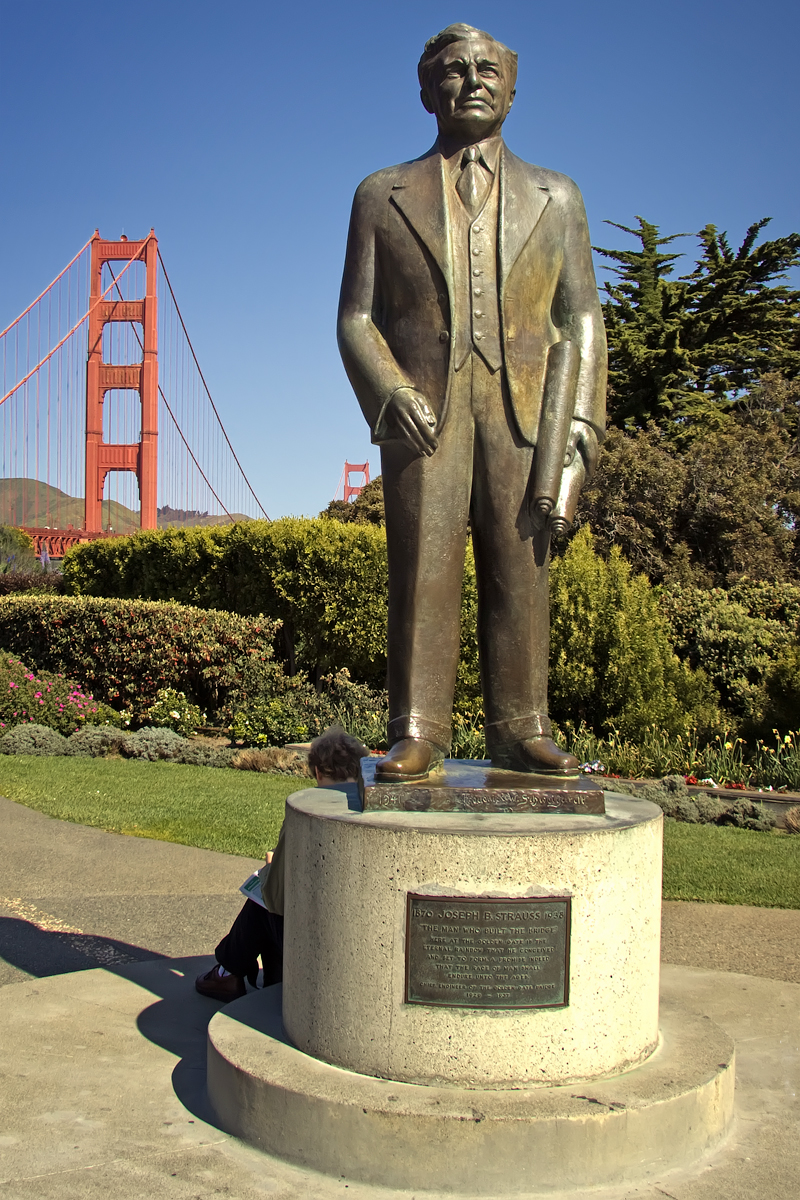
- The Joseph Strauss Memorial in San Francisco
- Born: January 9, 1870; Cincinnati, Ohio, US
- Died: May 16, 1938 (aged 68); Los Angeles, California, US
- Resting place: Forest Lawn Memorial Park
- Education: University of Cincinnati
- Occupation: Structural engineer
- Known for: Chief engineer of the Golden Gate Bridge
- Spouse: Felicity Strauss

Joseph Baermann Strauss (January 9, 1870 – May 16, 1938) was an American structural engineer who revolutionized the design of bascule bridges. He was the chief engineer of the Golden Gate Bridge in San Francisco, California.

== Early life and education ==
Strauss was born in Cincinnati, Ohio to an artistic family of German Jewish ancestry. His mother was a pianist, and his father, Raphael Strauss, was a writer and painter. He graduated from the University of Cincinnati in 1892 with a degree in civil engineering. He served as both class poet and class president, and was a member of the famed Ohio Epsilon chapter of Sigma Alpha Epsilon fraternity.

Strauss had many hobbies, including poetry. After completion of the Golden Gate Bridge, he returned to his passion of poetry and wrote his most recognizable poem, "The Mighty Task is Done". He also wrote "The Redwoods," which appeared on postcards.

He died in Los Angeles one year after the Golden Gate Bridge's completion. His statue, the Joseph Strauss Memorial, can be seen on the San Francisco side of the bridge. He is interred at Forest Lawn Memorial Park in Glendale.

== Early career and the bascule bridge ==
Strauss was hospitalized while in college and his hospital room overlooked the John A. Roebling Suspension Bridge. This sparked his interest in bridges. Upon graduating from the University of Cincinnati, Strauss worked at the office of Ralph Modjeski, whose firm specialized in building bridges. At that time, bascule bridges were built with expensive iron counterweights. Strauss proposed using cheaper concrete counterweights in place of iron. When his ideas were rejected, he left the firm and started his own, the Strauss Bascule Bridge Company of Chicago, where he revolutionized the design of bascule bridges.

== Bridge designs ==
Strauss was the designer of the Burnside Bridge (1926) in Portland, Oregon, and the Lewis and Clark Bridge (1930) over the Columbia River between Longview, Washington, and Rainier, Oregon. Strauss also worked with the Dominion Bridge Company in building the Cherry Street Strauss Trunnion Bascule Bridge (1931) in Toronto, Ontario. In 1912 he designed the HB&T Railway bascule bridge over Buffalo Bayou in Houston, Texas (now hidden under an Interstate 69 bridge in the shadow of downtown Houston). His design was also exported to Norway, where Skansen Bridge (1918) is still in daily use. He also designed the Palace Bridge (Dvortsovy), a double-leaf Strauss bascule bridge over the Neva River in St. Petersburg (then Petrograd), Russia, near the former tsar's winter palace.

The Strauss bridge design was also copied and used in other places in Europe. Two bridges are still in daily use in Sweden – the railway bridges over Trollhätte canal in Vänersborg and Danviksbron in Stockholm. In Sête, France, over Canal du Midi, another copy of Strauss-designed bridges is to be found.

=== Golden Gate Bridge ===
Strauss is credited as the chief engineer of the Golden Gate Bridge but Charles Alton Ellis is responsible for most of the structural design. Because of a dispute with Strauss, however, Ellis was not recognized for his work when the bridge opened in 1937. A plaque honoring Ellis was installed on the south tower in 2012 to acknowledge his contributions.

As chief engineer on the project, Strauss faced numerous challenges. He had to secure funding and support for the bridge from citizens and the U.S. military. The unique demands of the project also necessitated innovations in construction techniques: when it was completed it was the longest span in the world and had the tallest towers of any suspension bridge.

Strauss was concerned with the safety of his workers. During the construction of the Golden Gate Bridge, he required that a safety net be installed beneath the bridge, saving a total of 19 lives.

=== Other works ===
- FEC Strauss Trunnion Bascule Bridge (Jacksonville, Florida)
- Isleton Bridge
- Johnson Street Bridge
- Kinzie Street railroad bridge
- Mystic River Bascule Bridge
- St. Charles Air Line Bridge
- Lewis and Clark Bridge (Columbia River)
- Thames River Bridge (Amtrak)
- Outer Drive Bridge
- HX Draw
- Lefty O'Doul Bridge
- La Salle Causeway
- Congress Street Bridge (Boston)
- Skansen Bridge

== Personal life and death ==
Strauss had many hobbies, including poetry. After completion of the Golden Gate Bridge, he returned to his passion of poetry and wrote his most recognizable poem, "The Mighty Task is Done". He also wrote "The Redwood”, and his "Sequoia" can still be purchased by tourists visiting the California redwoods.

Strauss died in Los Angeles one year after the Golden Gate Bridge's completion. His statue, the Joseph Strauss Memorial, can be seen on the San Francisco side of the bridge. He is interred at Forest Lawn Memorial Park in Glendale.
