= Isleton, California =

City in California, United States

- City
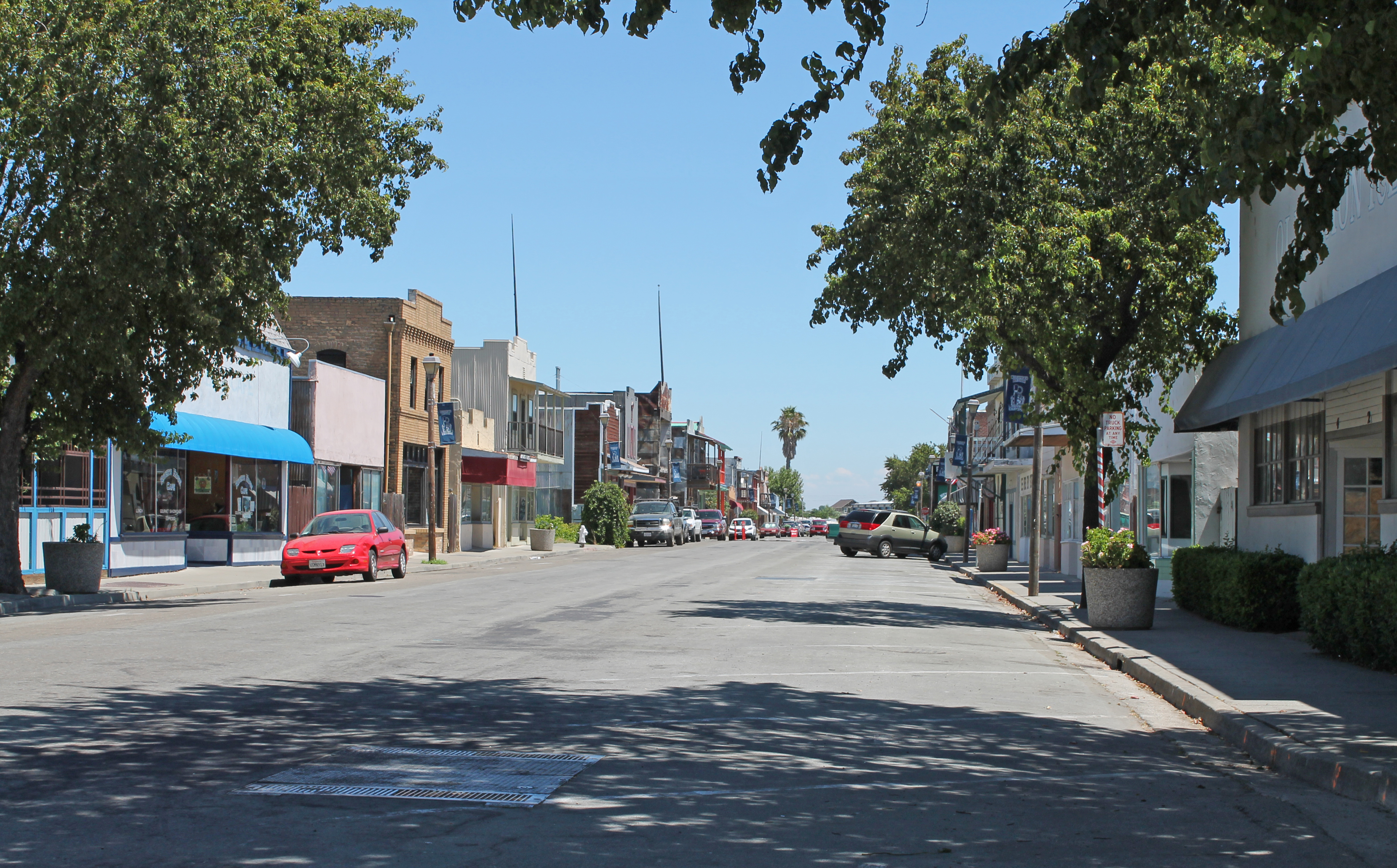
- Downtown Isleton, a National Historic Landmark
- Interactive map of Isleton, California
- Coordinates: 38°9′43″N 121°36′33″W
- Country: United States
- State: California
- County: Sacramento
- Incorporated: May 14, 1923

Area
  - Total: 0.49 sq mi (1.27 km^{2})
  - Land: 0.44 sq mi (1.14 km^{2})
  - Water: 0.050 sq mi (0.13 km^{2}) 10.57%
- Elevation: 10 ft (3.0 m)

Population (2020)
  - Total: 794
  - Density: 1,804/sq mi (696.7/km^{2})
- Time zone: UTC-8 (PST)
  - Summer (DST): UTC-7 (PDT)
- ZIP code: 95641
- Area code: 916, 279
- FIPS code: 06-36882
- GNIS feature IDs: 277531, 2410122
- Website: www.cityofisleton.com

Isleton is a city in Sacramento County, California, United States. The population was 794 at the 2020 census, down from 804 at the 2010 census. It is located on Andrus Island amid the slough wetlands of the Sacramento-San Joaquin River Delta, on the eastern edge of the Rio Vista Gas Field. The city has many preserved 19th-century era storefronts along its main street, some of which show distinct Chinese influences.

Isleton is part of the Sacramento metropolitan area. California State Route 160 passes through the city and crosses the 1923 Isleton Bridge.

== History ==
Isleton was founded 1874 by Josiah Poole. After having the town platted, he constructed a wharf on the Sacramento River, and a booming town soon followed. However, Isleton was flooded in 1878 and 1881, causing Poole financial difficulties and leading him to move out. The town also flooded in 1890, 1907, and 1972. As agriculture in the surrounding area developed, three canneries opened up in Isleton and other delta towns. The cannery workforce was over 90 percent Asian.

The Hotel del Rio in Isleton was built in 1949. It contains one of California's legal card rooms. This featured in the case of Novo vs. Hotel del Rio, decided May 4, 1956, reported in 141 C.A. 2nd, pg 304. This case created a stir because, although gambling debts are not enforceable at law, if money is lost that falls under California's community property laws, it may be recovered if it can be shown that permission was not given by the other spouse to gamble the money. The case attracted nationwide attention, and was used by Erle Stanley Gardner in his 1959 Perry Mason crime novel The Case of the Singing Skirt.

Chinese began immigrating to Isleton around 1875, and at its peak, the Chinese section of the city had about 1,500 people and included a branch of the Bing Kong Tong. The city also had a Japantown, just east of Chinatown. The Chinese and Japanese districts are in the National Register of Historic Places. (Actor Pat Morita was born in Isleton in 1932.)

As the canneries folded, the population started to decline, although it has started to rebound since 2010. Its economy was badly hit by the recession in 2007. In 2010, Isleton attempted to raise money by permitting a marijuana farm in return for a share of the profits, but it was abandoned after warnings from the U.S. Department of Justice. In 2012, the city lost its police department.

== Geography ==
Isleton is located at 38°9′43″N 121°36′33″W (38.161861, -121.609269).

According to the United States Census Bureau, the city has a total area of 0.5 square miles (1.3 km^{2}), of which 0.4 square miles (1.0 km^{2}) is land and 0.05 square miles (0.13 km^{2}) (10.50%) is water.

=== Climate ===
According to the Köppen Climate Classification system, Isleton has a warm-summer Mediterranean climate, abbreviated "Csb" on climate maps.

== Demographics ==
Historical population
| Census | Pop. | Note | %± |
|---|---|---|---|
| 1930 | 2,090 | | — |
| 1940 | 1,837 | | −12.1% |
| 1950 | 1,597 | | −13.1% |
| 1960 | 1,039 | | −34.9% |
| 1970 | 909 | | −12.5% |
| 1980 | 914 | | 0.6% |
| 1990 | 833 | | −8.9% |
| 2000 | 828 | | −0.6% |
| 2010 | 804 | | −2.9% |
| 2020 | 794 | | −1.2% |
U.S. Decennial Census

=== 2020 ===
The 2020 United States census reported that Isleton had a population of 794. The population density was 1,804.5 inhabitants per square mile (696.7/km^{2}). The racial makeup of Isleton was 375 (47.2%) White, 13 (1.6%) African American, 17 (2.1%) Native American, 39 (4.9%) Asian, 1 (0.1%) Pacific Islander, 222 (28.0%) from other races, and 127 (16.0%) from two or more races. Hispanic or Latino of any race were 347 persons (43.7%).

The whole population lived in households. There were 311 households, out of which 110 (35.4%) had children under the age of 18 living in them, 135 (43.4%) were married-couple households, 22 (7.1%) were cohabiting couple households, 86 (27.7%) had a female householder with no partner present, and 68 (21.9%) had a male householder with no partner present. 74 households (23.8%) were one person, and 34 (10.9%) were one person aged 65 or older. The average household size was 2.55. There were 214 families (68.8% of all households).

The age distribution was 175 people (22.0%) under the age of 18, 66 people (8.3%) aged 18 to 24, 178 people (22.4%) aged 25 to 44, 243 people (30.6%) aged 45 to 64, and 132 people (16.6%) who were 65 years of age or older. The median age was 42.7 years. For every 100 females, there were 95.6 males.

There were 388 housing units at an average density of 881.8 units per square mile (340.5 units/km^{2}), of which 311 (80.2%) were occupied. Of these, 177 (56.9%) were owner-occupied, and 134 (43.1%) were occupied by renters.

=== 2010 ===
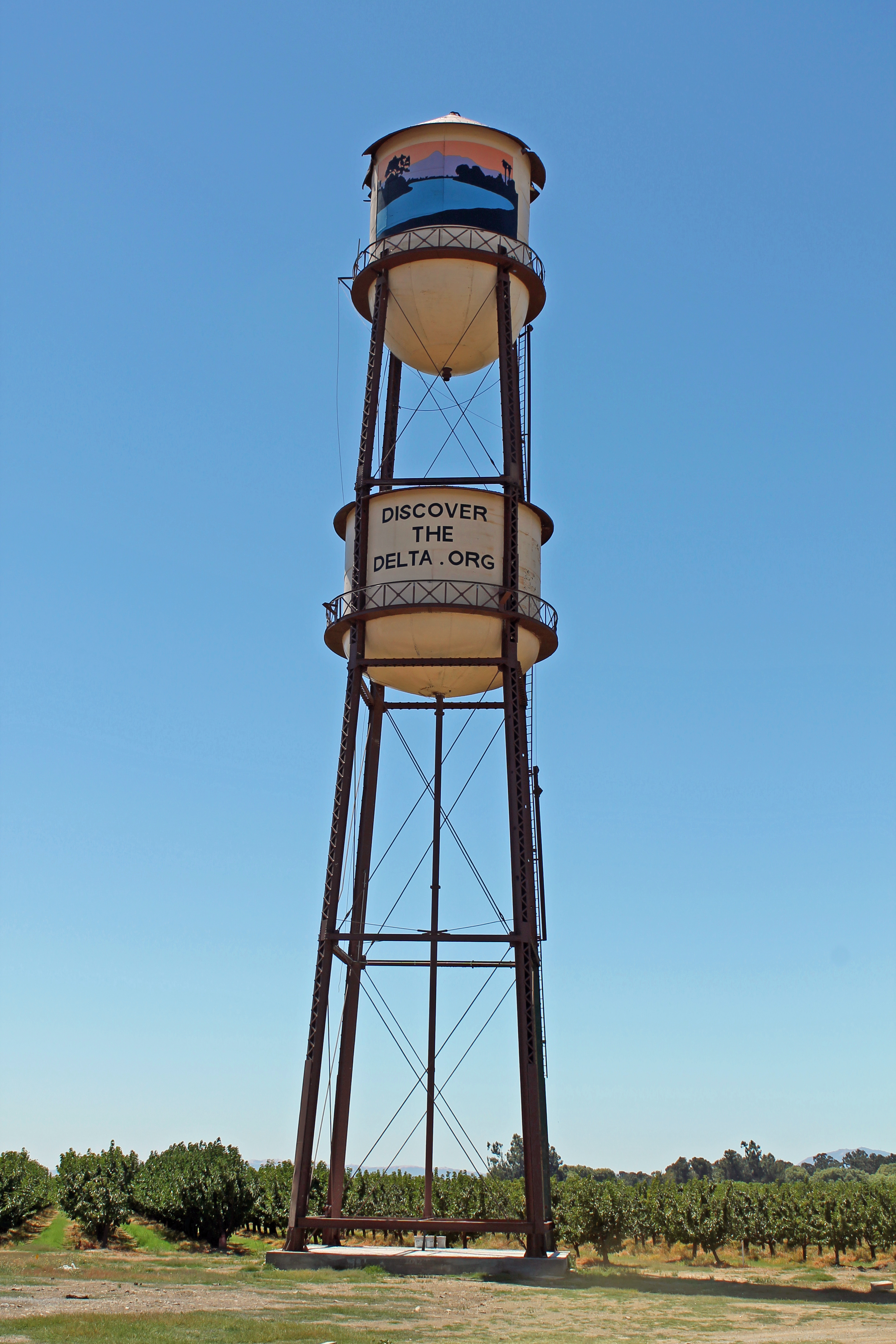
Water tower in Isleton

At the 2010 census Isleton had a population of 804. The population density was 1,636.9 inhabitants per square mile (632.0/km^{2}). The ethnic makeup of Isleton was 542 (67.4%) White, 316 (39.3%) Hispanic or Latino, 10 (1.2%) African American, 10 (1.2%) Native American, 41 (5.1%) Asian, 4 (0.5%) Pacific Islander, 139 (17.3%) from other races, and 58 (7.2%) from two or more races.

The whole population lived in households, no one lived in non-institutionalized group quarters and no one was institutionalized.

There were 331 households, 96 (29.0%) had children under the age of 18 living in them, 109 (32.9%) were heterosexual married couples living together, 46 (13.9%) had a female householder with no husband present, 23 (6.9%) had a male householder with no wife present. There were 25 (7.6%) unmarried heterosexual partnerships, and 4 (1.2%) homosexual married couples or partnerships. 125 households (37.8%) were one person and 51 (15.4%) had someone living alone who was 65 or older. The average household size was 2.43. There were 178 families (53.8% of households); the average family size was 3.35.

The age distribution was 191 people (23.8%) under the age of 18, 71 people (8.8%) aged 18 to 24, 172 people (21.4%) aged 25 to 44, 235 people (29.2%) aged 45 to 64, and 135 people (16.8%) who were 65 or older. The median age was 42.1 years. For every 100 females, there were 107.2 males. For every 100 females age 18 and over, there were 114.3 males.

There were 425 housing units at an average density of 865.3 per square mile, of the occupied units 184 (55.6%) were owner-occupied and 147 (44.4%) were rented. The homeowner vacancy rate was 11.9%; the rental vacancy rate was 19.7%. 436 people (54.2% of the population) lived in owner-occupied housing units and 368 people (45.8%) lived in rental housing units.

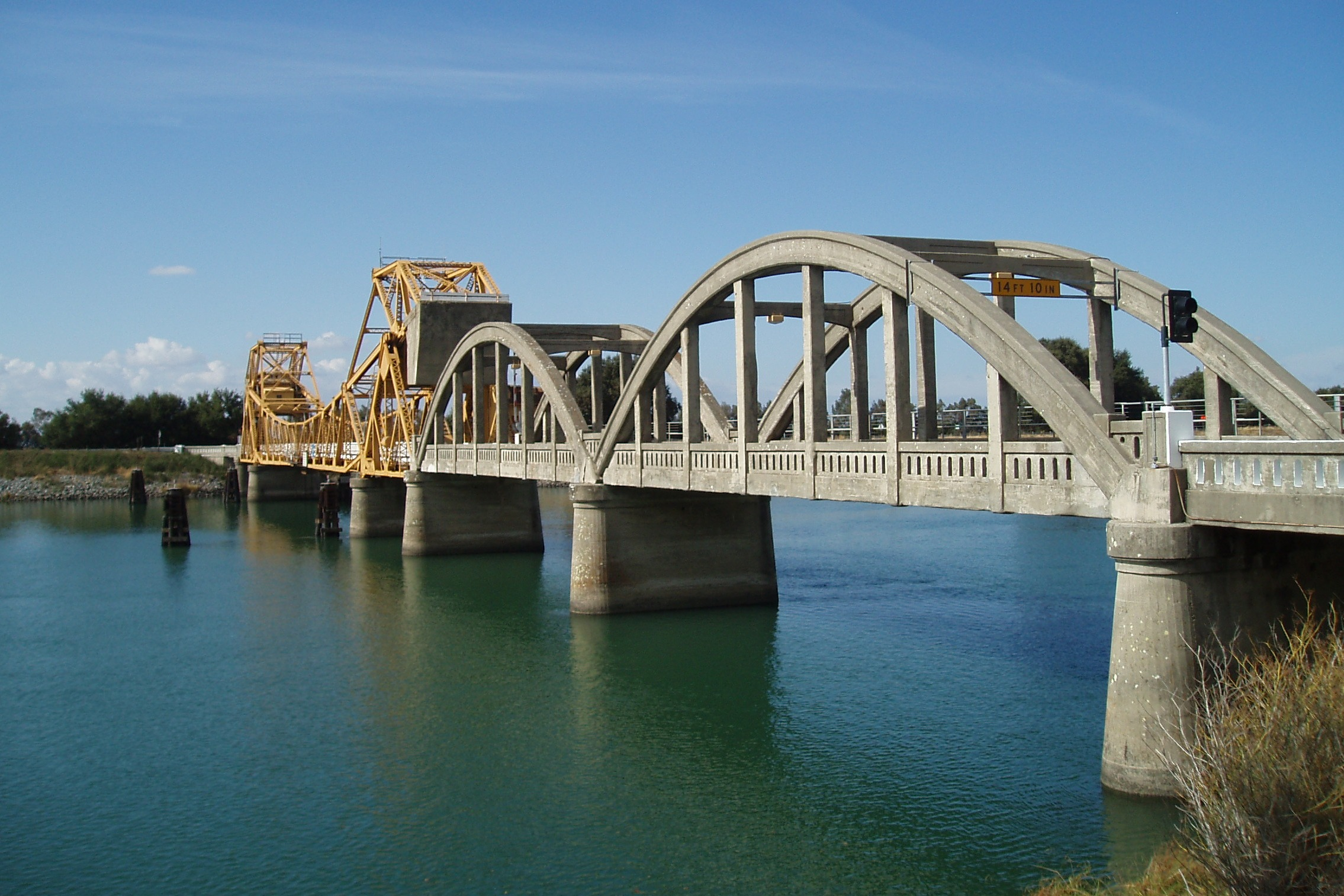
Arched bridge with drawbridge section over the Sacramento River just north of Isleton

== Politics ==
In the California State Legislature, Isleton is in the 3rd senatorial district, represented by Democrat Christopher Cabaldon, and in the 9th Assembly district, represented by Republican Heath Flora.

In the United States House of Representatives, Isleton is in California's 7th congressional district, represented by Democrat Doris Matsui.
