= List of crossings of the Lower American River =

This is a list of crossings of the Lower American River, the approximately 23 miles (37 km) reach of the American River between Nimbus Dam and its confluence with the Sacramento River, in Sacramento County, California. Crossings include highway and local-road bridges, railroad bridges, and bridges used by pedestrians and cyclists. Several form connections within the American River Parkway.

The existing crossings are listed from downstream to upstream, beginning near the river mouth in Sacramento. Crossings of Lake Natoma and the river upstream of Nimbus Dam are outside the scope of this list. Parallel structures at the same crossing are grouped where indicated. Former crossings are listed separately.

== Existing crossings ==
Dates refer to construction of the listed structure unless an opening, rehabilitation or conversion date is specified. Caltrans bridge numbers are provided where verified in its state or local-agency inventories. A dash indicates that a construction date or bridge number is not supplied here.

Crossing	Caltrans bridge no.	Carries	Location	Built / opened	Notes
Jibboom Street Bridge	24C0022	Jibboom Street	Sacramento; Discovery Park	1931	Road crossing near the river mouth; connects with Discovery Park.
American River viaducts (Interstate 5)	24 0068L / 24 0068R	Interstate 5	Sacramento	1968	Parallel northbound and southbound highway bridges.
North 16th Street Bridge / State Route 160, westbound	24 0001L	State Route 160; light rail	Sacramento	1915	Older structure in the SR 160 crossing; the route is also described as southbound in Caltrans records. The inventory identifies light rail at this bridge.
State Route 160, eastbound bridge	24 0001R	State Route 160	Sacramento	1968	Companion highway structure at the North Sacramento Freeway crossing.
Sacramento Northern Bikeway bridge (Pipe's Bridge)	—	Pedestrians and bicycles	Sacramento	—	Former Sacramento Northern railroad bridge converted to a trail crossing.
Union Pacific railroad bridge (western crossing)	—	Railroad	Sacramento; upstream of SR 160	—	Former Western Pacific crossing; one of the two active railroad crossings identified in the city's historic context.
Union Pacific railroad bridge (eastern crossing)	—	Railroad; Martinez Subdivision	Sacramento; near Sutter's Landing Park	1910	Former Southern Pacific crossing. The Martinez Subdivision bridge is downstream of Business 80.
American River Bridge (Capital City Freeway)	24 0003	State Route 51 / Interstate 80 Business	Sacramento; near Cal Expo	1954	Widened in 1966. A later rehabilitation project includes deck replacement and a Class I bicycle and pedestrian path.
H Street Bridge (Officer Tara O'Sullivan Memorial Bridge)	24C0076	H Street / Fair Oaks Boulevard	Sacramento	1932	A vehicle bridge was built in 1912, and the current truss bridge was built in 1932. The former bridge's column supports are still visible just upriver from the current bridge.
Guy West Bridge	—	Pedestrians and bicycles	Sacramento State / Campus Commons	1967 (opened)	Suspension footbridge connecting the campus and Campus Commons; restored in 2015.
Howe Avenue bridges	24C0107L / 24C0107R	Howe Avenue	Sacramento	1969	Paired road bridges upstream of the Sacramento State campus.
Watt Avenue Bridge	24C0089	Watt Avenue	Sacramento County	1961	Road crossing at the Watt Avenue area of the parkway.
Harold Richey Memorial Bridge	—	Pedestrians and bicycles	William B. Pond Recreation Area / River Bend Park	—	Trail crossing connecting the two county parks; also called the Harold Richey Bicycle Bridge.
Jim Jones Bridge (Jim's Bridge; PCA Bridge)	—	Pedestrians, bicycles and equestrians	Sacramento Bar / Lower Sunrise	1959	Built for aggregate hauling and subsequently converted to recreational use.
Sunrise Boulevard Bridge	24C0074	Sunrise Boulevard	Fair Oaks / Rancho Cordova	1955	Vehicle, pedestrian and bicycle crossing between the Lower and Upper Sunrise areas.
Old Fair Oaks Bridge	—	Pedestrians and bicycles	Fair Oaks / Gold River	1907	Pennsylvania Petit truss bridge; formerly carried road traffic. Listed on the National Register of Historic Places in 2006.
Hazel Avenue Bridge	24C0100	Hazel Avenue	Sacramento County; below Nimbus Dam	1966	A later bridge improvement project was completed in October 2011.

== Former crossings ==
The following table includes documented earlier bridges, including predecessors at sites still used for river crossings. The entries are not an exhaustive inventory of nineteenth-century bridges or ferries. Surviving bridges converted from railway or industrial use to trails remain in the existing-crossings table.

Former crossing	Location	Documented date	Former use	History
Swift's Bridge	Lower American River, Sacramento vicinity	In use by 1861	Road bridge	Reed's county history records its destruction during the March 1861 flood.
Lisle's Bridge	Approximately the later North 16th Street crossing	Nineteenth century	Road bridge	Predecessor crossing near the site of the 1915 bridge. Reed records flood destruction in March 1861 and further loss of bridge sections in December 1861.
Norris's Bridge	Lower American River, Sacramento vicinity	In use by 1861	Road bridge	Reed identifies it separately from Swift's and Lisle's bridges and records that it became impassable during the March 1861 flood; the account does not establish its final removal date.
First Fair Oaks bridge	Fair Oaks crossing	1901	Road bridge	Washed out in a flood; followed by a temporary bridge.
Temporary Fair Oaks bridge	Fair Oaks crossing	Before 1907	Road bridge	Replaced by the surviving Old Fair Oaks Bridge in 1907.

Reed also records the establishment of ferries after the March 1861 flood made the lower river's bridges unusable.

== Upstream boundary ==
Nimbus Dam marks the upstream limit of this list. It was constructed in 1952–1955 and began operating in 1955. As a water-control structure, it is described separately from the transportation bridges.

== Proposed crossings ==
The City of Sacramento has studied a Truxel Bridge crossing between Truxel Road in South Natomas and Sequoia Pacific Boulevard in the River District.

== See also ==
- American River
- American River Parkway
- Jedediah Smith Memorial Trail
- List of crossings of the Sacramento River
