= Nisipowinan Village =

Historical Landmark in Sacramento, United States

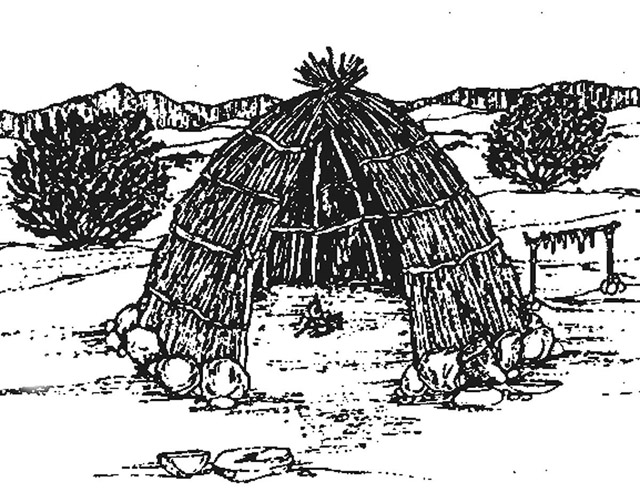
- Nisipowinan Village Hut

- Location within California Location within the United States
- 38.605°N 121.499°W
- Location: North bank of American River; Sacramento, California

History
- Built: Pre-Columbian era ~2,000 years ago

Site notes
- Architect: Nisenan Tribe
- Architectural style: Tule Reed Wigwam

California Historical Landmark
- Designated: June 16, 1976
- Reference no.: 900

Nisipowinan Village, also spelled Nisenan Village was a major Nisenan Native American tribe Village that is a historical site in Sacramento, California. The Nisipowinan Village in Sacramento is a California Historical Landmark No. 900 listed on June 16, 1976. The Sacramento Nisipowinan Village was located on the north banks of the American River just east of the now Interstate 5 Freeway in the Sacramento Discovery Park. The Nisenan tribe was part of the Maidu tribe. In the 1840s the Nisenan tribe traded and worked in peace with people in and around Sutter's Fort, founded by John Sutter in 1839, which was located on the south bank of the American River.

== History ==
Nisenan called the Village, Pushune and called the American River, Kum Sayo, meaning Roundhouse River. Nisenan built tule reed plant dome-shaped huts on dirt mounds. The mounds stop flooding of the homes when the river flooded. The sweat houses and acorn granaries storage structures also were on mounds. Pushune Village was hunter gather tribe, acorn were turned in to a mush, gruels, or flatbreads. The Nisenan fished and hunted small game. Coastal California seashells beads were used for currency, along with food and fur trading. As the town of New Helvetia (now Sacramento) and Sutter's Fort grew with the California Gold Rush, it displaced the Nisenan's Pushune Village. Nisenan tribe lived in Northern California and the California Central Valley.

The Effie Yeaw Nature Center in Carmichael, California, east of Sacramento has a replica of a Nisenan Village hut.

== See also ==
- California Historical Landmarks in Sacramento County
