= Effie Yeaw =

California educator and conservationist

- Born: May 5, 1900; Chico, California
- Died: January 3, 1970 (aged 69); Sacramento, California
- Education: University of California, Berkeley (BA); University of Hawaiʻi (MA)
- Occupation: Educator
- Spouse: William H. Yeaw
- Children: 3

Effie Yeaw (pronounced Yaw) (May 5, 1900 – January 3, 1970) was an educator, conservationist, and leader in efforts to protect the American River Parkway in Sacramento County, California.

Yeaw is best remembered for leading tens of thousands of schoolchildren on field trips along the American River in Deterding Woods (now Ancil Hoffman Park), inspiring public appreciation that contributed to the establishment and conservation of the American River Parkway. The Effie Yeaw Nature Center, built in Ancil Hoffman Park in 1976, was posthumously named in her honor.

== Early life, education, and teaching career ==
Effie May Cummings Yeaw was born in Chico, California, on May 5, 1900. Her parents, Galen Cummings and Ella Stineman, were both teachers. Her family moved several times during her childhood, seeking favorable climate for her father, who had tuberculosis. Galen eventually died of the disease when Effie was five. Later in life, Yeaw recalled her father introducing her to desert wildflowers during walks in the Mojave Desert when the family lived near Barstow, California.

After her father died, Yeaw moved with her mother to Lincoln, California, and then to Sacramento. Yeaw attended high school at Sacramento High School, where she became president of the Biological Honor Society and helped develop a school museum.

She earned a bachelor's degree in social studies from the University of California, Berkeley, in 1922. After graduation, she became a public school teacher, teaching briefly in Oakland and then for seven years in Sacramento at Harkness Elementary School and Miwok Middle School. She later moved to Honolulu, Hawaii, where she taught for four years at Kalākaua Junior High School while simultaneously working toward a master's degree from the University of Hawaiʻi, which she earned in 1932.

Yeaw then returned to Sacramento to marry William H. Yeaw, an auditor for the Western Pacific Railroad. The couple lived in Carmichael and had three children. Yeaw taught intermittently while her children were growing up, then returned to teaching full-time for the Arden-Carmichael Union School District from 1948 until she retired in 1962.

== Conservation and advocacy ==
Yeaw became active in conservation through the Audubon Society in the 1940s. She was one of the first members of the Sacramento Audubon Society, and throughout her life participated in committee work, led nature hikes, and assisted with the organization's annual bird census. In the 1950s, Yeaw founded and led the Carmichael Junior Audubon Society, which operated as its own club and reported its own bird census. Yeaw held conservation leadership roles in the Sacramento Audubon Society and the Sacramento River Valley District of the California Garden Clubs.

Sacramento Bee (Nov. 9, 1962)

Yeaw was the first secretary of the C.M. Goethe Arboretum Society.

In 1952, Yeaw established the Carmichael Conservation Center, where she developed conservation education programming for students in the Arden-Carmichael Union School District. Yeaw served as the center's director until 1955. The center was short-lived, but through this experience Yeaw developed the concept of using Deterding Woods as an outdoor classroom for teaching natural history. Through the Conservation Center, Yeaw also received and cared for injured animals, sometimes fostering them in her own home.

In the 1950s and 1960s, Yeaw became a regular speaker at public board meetings advocating for conservation issues. One of her early advocacy successes was persuading the federal government not to cut down a large deodar cedar tree during the construction of a new post office in Carmichael, California, near her home—the post office was built and the tree was saved.

Protecting the American River Parkway against private development became increasingly urgent for Yeaw and other conservation leaders in the late 1950s. Annual flooding on the Lower American River had constrained development naturally, but the Folsom Dam and Nimbus Dam and new levees completed in the 1950s made development closer to the river technically feasible. Although state and county plans designated the 23 miles from Nimbus Dam to the Sacramento River as a parkway, by 1960 most of the land remained in private control.

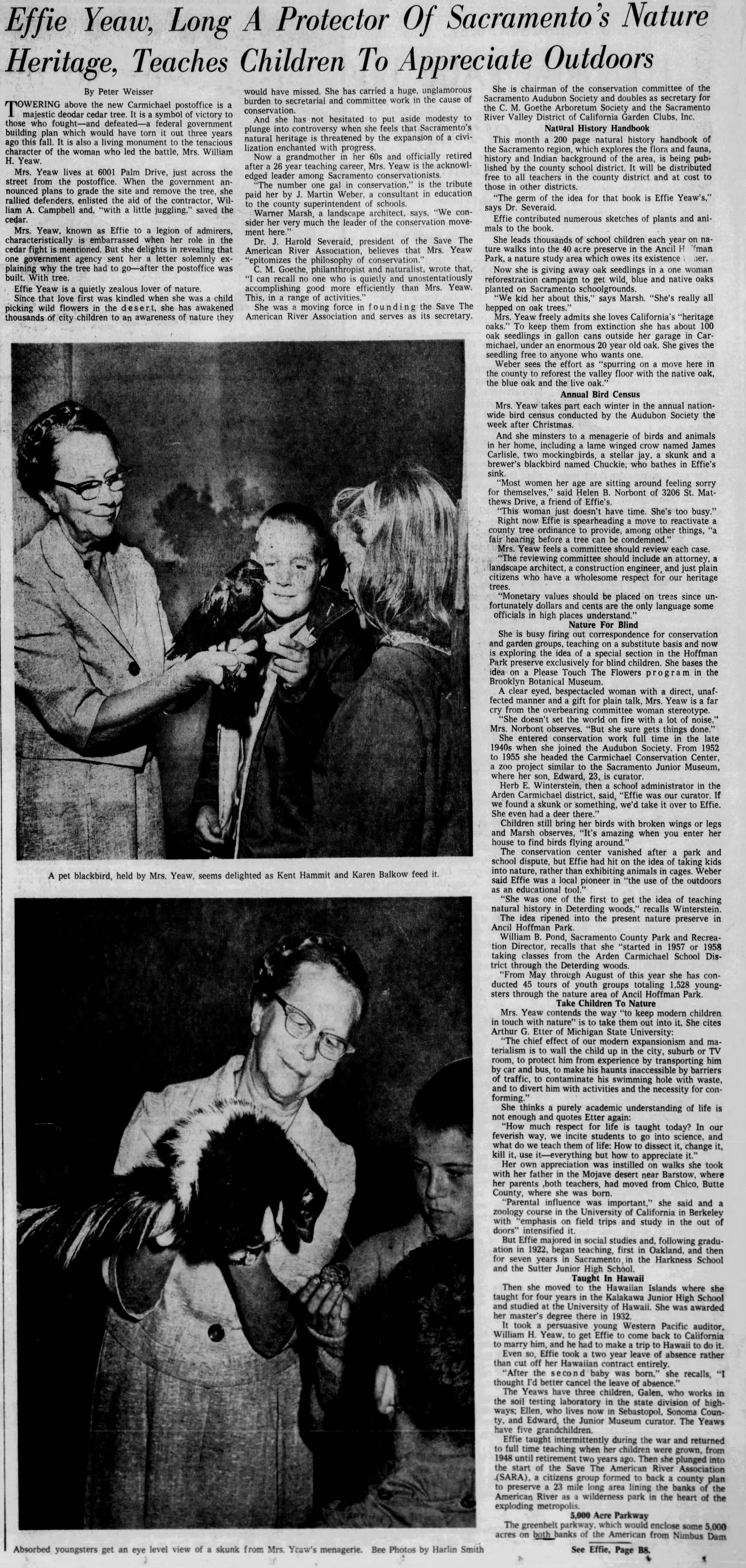
Sacramento Bee (Nov. 24, 1963)

In the late 1950s, Yeaw and other conservationists loosely organized as a "Committee of Concern," advocating for the creation of the American River Parkway. On February 28, 1961, they formed the Save the American River Association (SARA) to coordinate public campaigning for preservation of the parkway. SARA's efforts are recognized as a contributing factor leading to the Sacramento County Board of Supervisors' adoption of the American River Parkway concept in the county's 1962 General Plan and its implementation of the plan throughout the 1960s. SARA was credited for its public outreach educating county residents about the proposed parkway, including organizing speaker series, creating and distributing pamphlets, and producing a short documentary, Operation STAR, which aired on local television. Yeaw's youth field trips to Deterding Woods were prominently featured in these materials. The Sacramento Bee ran feature articles with large photo spreads of Yeaw's work in 1962 and again in 1963, and similar photographs appeared in a 1964 article in Sunset Magazine titled "How the American River was 'saved' – Community Action in the West ... a success story in Sacramento."

Sunset Magazine (1964)

In the early 1960s, Yeaw expanded her Deterding Woods field trip program, enlisting volunteer docents and formalizing her relationship with the County Department of Parks and Recreation. In 1964, she reported that she and her docents had led 7,200 schoolchildren on field trips during the 1963–64 school year alone. She also reported that the Parks Department was studying plans to construct a nature center in Deterding Woods and to expand the program to other suitable areas.

== Publications ==
In 1963, Yeaw wrote and illustrated a field guide, The Outdoor World of the Sacramento Region, published through the Sacramento County Office of Education. The guide was made available for free to Sacramento County teachers, sold thousands of copies, and continues to be published through updated editions.

Yeaw also contributed to educational publications including Oaks, Our Heritage Trees; Indoor-Outdoor Natural Learning Experiences; and Cultural Summer School Science Unit (K–3).

== Honors and legacy ==
Yeaw died of cancer in 1970, but the County Parks Department continued to employ nature tour guides in Ancil Hoffman Park to carry on Yeaw's work. The Effie Yeaw Nature Center was built in Ancil Hoffman Park in 1976 and named in her honor. Since the 1980s, a non-profit organization, the American River Natural History Association, has continued operation of the Nature Center.

Yeaw’s conservation work was featured in numerous newspaper and magazine articles. In 1965, she received the American Motors Corporation Conservation Award. In 2009, the California Park and Recreation Society inducted Yeaw into its Hall of Honor.
