= Fair Oaks Bridge =

Bridge in United States of America

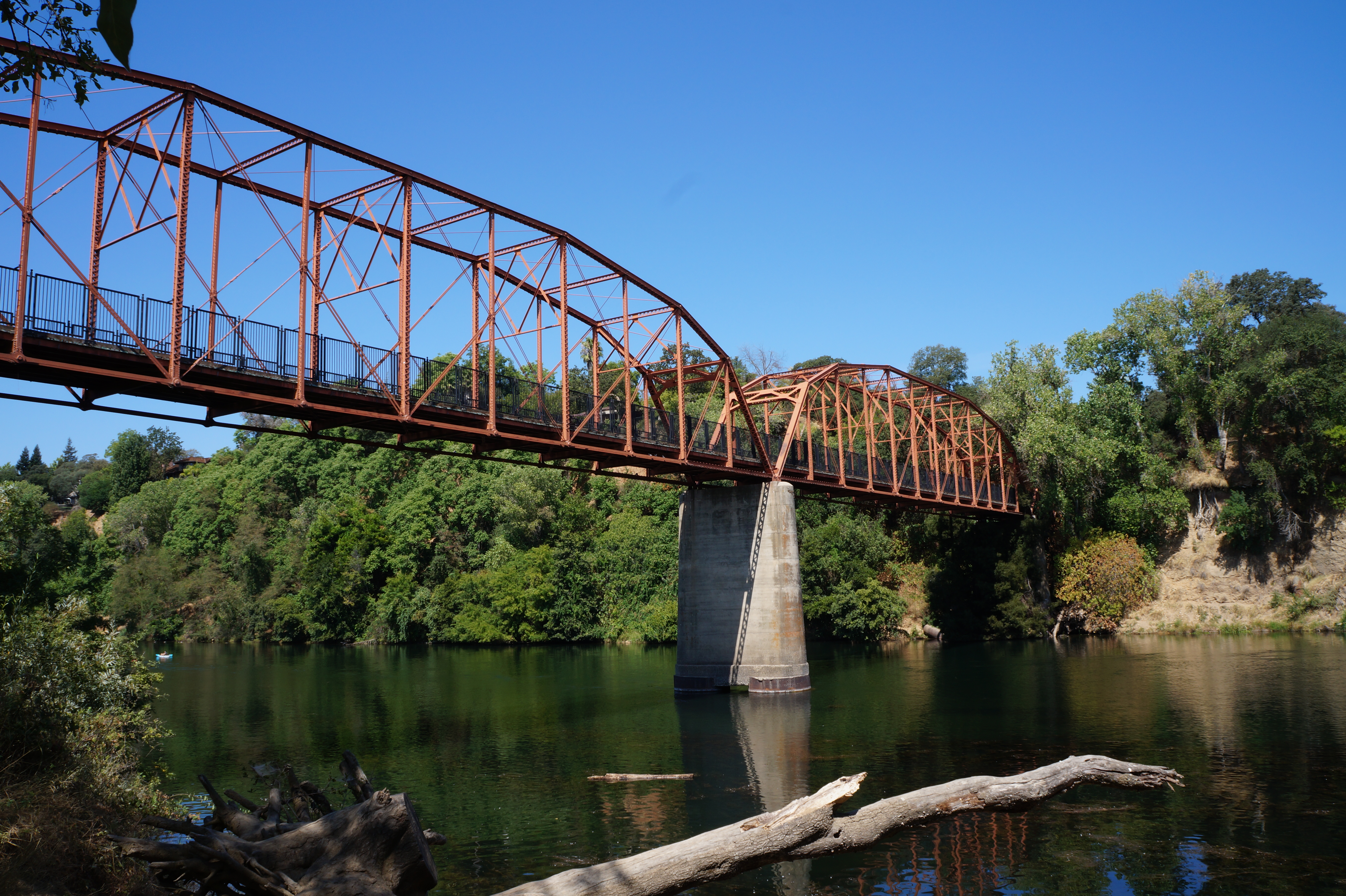
- Coordinates: 38.636271°N 121.265109°W
- Crosses: American River
- Locale: Sacramento, California, United States
- Official name: Fair Oaks Bridge
- Named for: Fair Oaks, California
- NBI number

Characteristics
- Design: Pennsylvania Truss bridge

History
- Constructed by: Western Bridge and Construction Company
- Built: 1907-09

Location
- Interactive map of Fair Oaks Bridge

The Fair Oaks Bridge is a truss bridge over the lower banks of the American River, connecting Fair Oaks to the greater Sacramento, California region. The current bridge, built 1907-1909 at a cost of $63,000, is the third bridge at this location.

The first bridge, which opened in 1901, helped to transform the small semi-rural community into a turn-of-the-century agricultural powerhouse. The present bridge, built 1907-1909, helped to transform the citrus colony into one of the leading bedroom communities of Sacramento by the 1940s. It is now a pedestrian and bicycle-only bridge.

== History ==
=== 19th-century background ===
Brevet Brigadier General Charles Henry Howard and James W. Wilson of the Howard-Wilson Publishing Company of Chicago acquired rights to sell land from California Senator Frederick K. Cox and businessman Crawford W. Clarke in 1895. The Howard-Wilson Company had the land surveyed and mapped and began to promote Fair Oaks as one of their "Sunset Colonies". The Howard-Wilson Company advertised Fair Oaks as an innovative and growing citrus colony after destructive freezes in Southern California and Florida and a national depression hitting in 1893. Many of the purchasers were professionals and other friends of the investors. Thus, the Fair Oaks community became initially composed of mostly businessmen and other professionals, including bankers and engineers.

Three hundred permanent settlers resided in Fair Oaks by 1897 and bought land in 5, 10, and 20-acre (8.1 ha) tracts at an average of $30 per acre. These pioneers planned to sustain themselves by planting and cultivating fruit orchards although the majority of them had little experience with farming. Promises of a bridge being built over the American River to better transport the new colony's fruit to the booming markets in Sacramento and beyond further sustained this hope. The following year, however, investment began to diminish and the Howard-Wilson Company withdrew from the colony and with it went unfulfilled promises of a bridge over the American River and railroad service from Sacramento.

Businessmen in Chicago and Sacramento who had an investment (land or fruit) in the newborn colony and Orangevale formed the Chicago-Fair Oaks Club in 1899. Local businessmen, including Valentine S. McClatchy (the co-owner of the Sacramento Bee), incorporated the Fair Oaks Development Company in 1900. These boosters shamelessly proclaimed Fair Oaks to be the "crown of the [Sacramento] valley", in the "heart of California". Together, in 1901, these two groups convinced the County of Sacramento's Chamber of Commerce, which McClatchy's business partners from Orangevale created and chaired, to build a bridge across the American River at Fair Oaks and persuaded the Southern Pacific Rail Road Company to build a railroad spur to the bridge. In the summer of 1901 the spur and railroad station were built. The station was named Fair Oaks Bridge Depot. The spur to the main line of the Southern Pacific Railroad Co. helped Fair Oaks farmers and fruit companies prosper by enabling growers to distribute fresh fruit to a vast market.

=== Three bridges ===
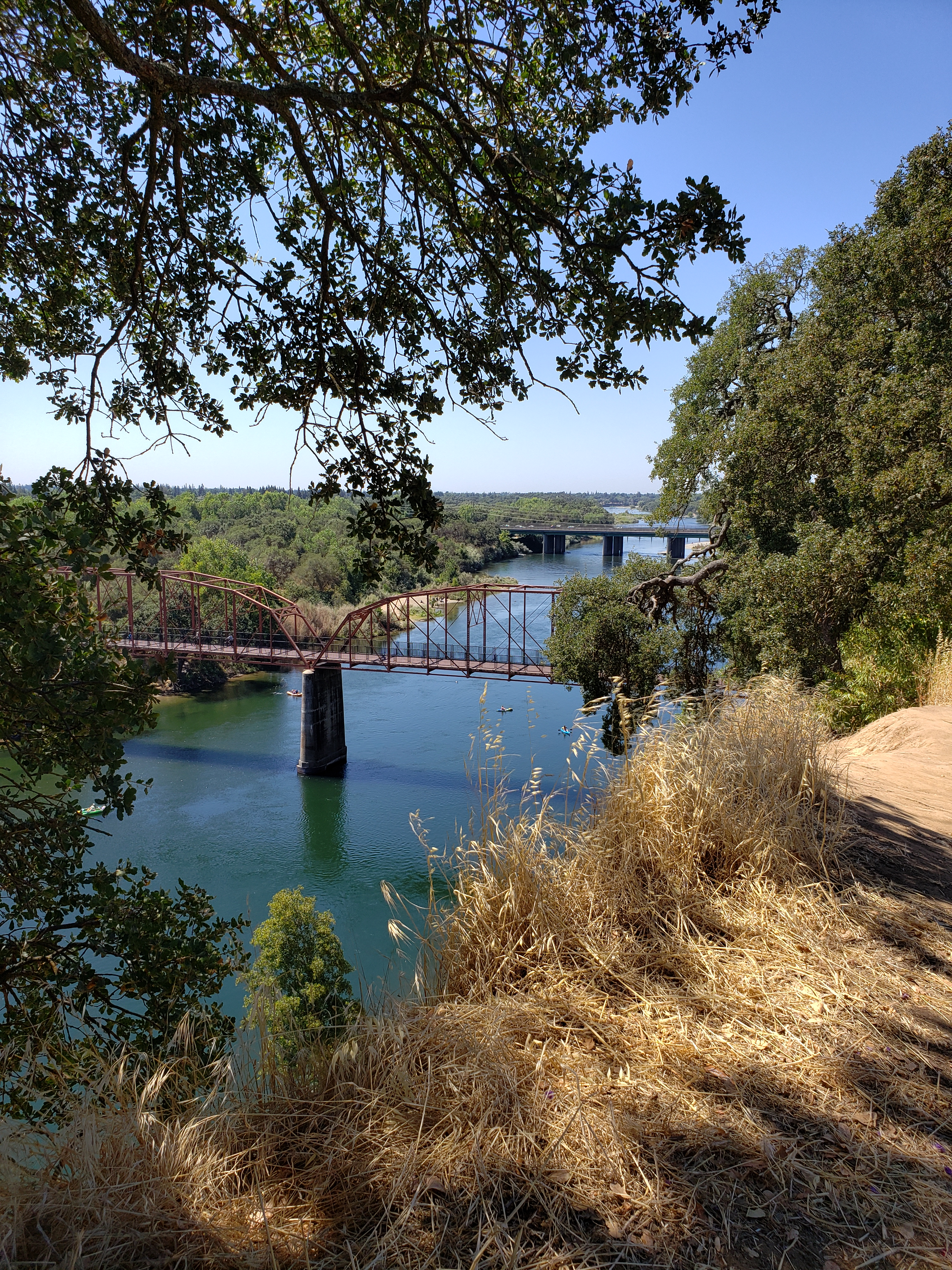
Two of the three bridges. The third bridge is hidden behind the second.

Fair Oaks grew rapidly with the completion of the Fair Oaks Bridge and the railroad line. This first Fair Oaks Bridge, however, was washed out in a flood in March 1907. An 850-foot steel cable was then borrowed from the Folsom Development Company to use with a ferry boat across the river. The Sacramento County Board of Supervisors also authorized the construction of a temporary bridge. Actually, Myrtle Shaw Lord, in his officially sanctioned history of the Chamber of Commerce, A Sacramento Saga: Fifty Years of Achievement—Chamber of Commerce Leadership, writes that after the flooding of 1906 and 1907 that the Sacramento Chamber of Commerce committed itself to dealing with the problems of flooding in Sacramento generally and sponsored the rebuilding of a bridge at Fair Oaks: "With destruction as a teacher, Sacramento learned an expensive lesson and determined there should be no repetition." By the end of the year the Western Bridge and Construction Company of Omaha, Nebraska began the double truss bridge that still survives and services the community today. In fact, because of its historical and architectural significance, it was placed on the National Register of Historic Places in September 2006.

The Fair Oaks Bridge's usefulness, however, diminished with the construction of bridges at Watt Avenue (to the west) in 1959 and Hazel Avenue (to the east) in 1967, as well the widening of the Sunrise Bridge (less than half a mile west) in 1968. The Fair Oaks Bridge was closed to traffic in 1967 and became the property of the Sacramento County Parks and Recreation Department after serving more than fifty years as the major crossing over the lower American River. Parks and Recreation re-decked and painted the bridge in 1973 and opened it as a pedestrian and bicycle crossing that currently connects to the American Parkway Trail along the lower banks of the American River.

== Bridge structure ==
The Fair Oaks Bridge is an excellent example of bridge construction and technology advancement in the mid- to late 19th century. It is a Pennsylvania Petit through Pratt truss bridge that extends nearly 500 feet (150 m) across a wide bend in the American River and is the second oldest out of ten surviving bridges of this type in the state of California (behind the historic truss bridge in Folsom that connects to Orangevale, built in 1893). The Sacramento County Surveyor hoped to minimize the number of piers in this dangerous current that necessitated very long main spans. The Pennsylvania Petit specifically addressed such applications. The two 200 ft spans were quite daring for their time. The bridge is also a rare example of the Western Bridge and Construction Company of Omaha that built truss bridges throughout the West but only rarely in California.

=== Truss bridge ===
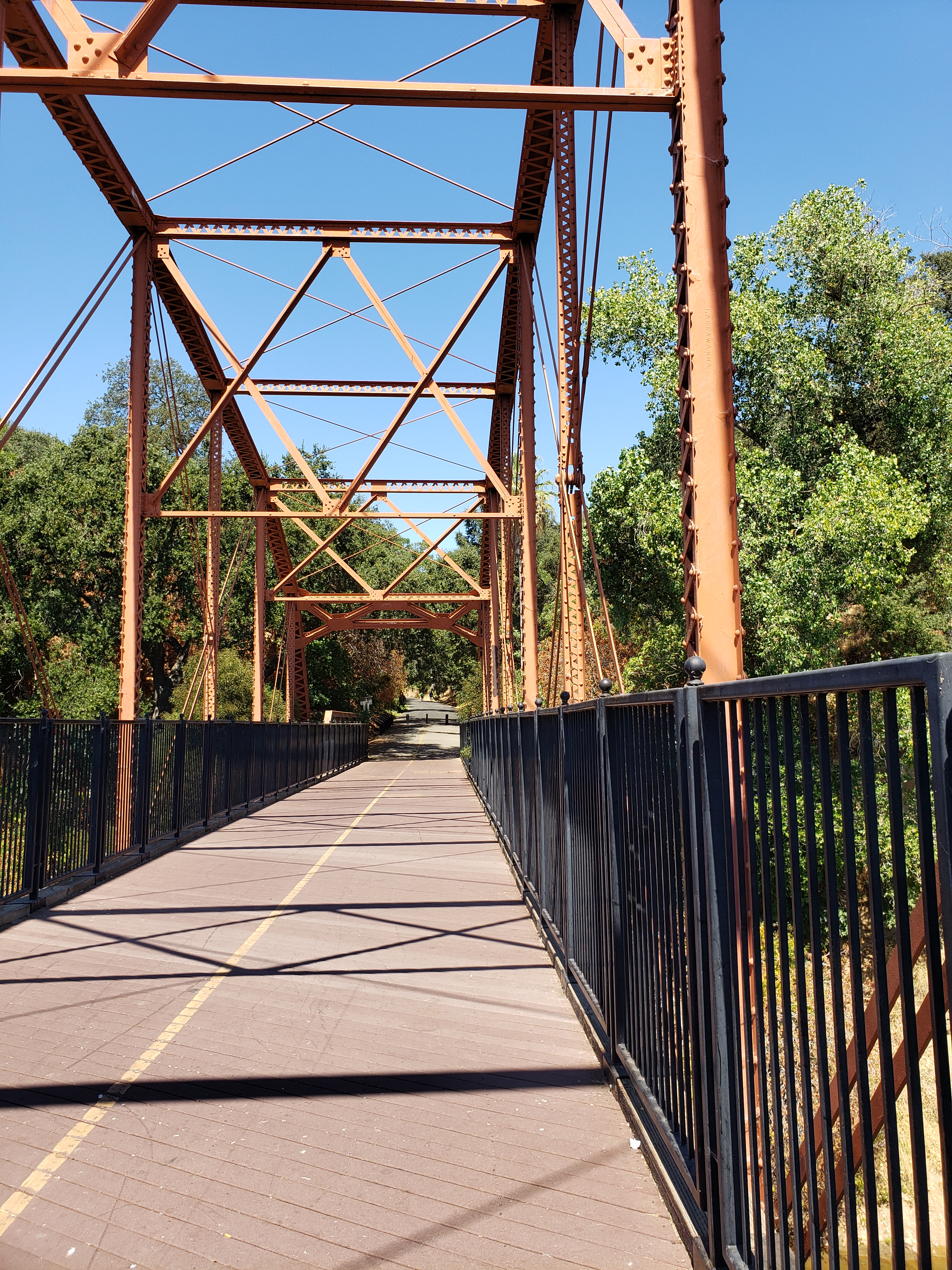
View of Fair Oaks Bridge facing the Fair Oaks side of the river.

A truss bridge is any bridge whose individual members are connected in a triangular pattern. Truss bridges date back to at least the 16th century, although the metal truss bridge, such as the Fair Oaks Bridge, dates only to the 1840s. These metal truss bridges, especially the Pratt and Warren trusses, facilitated the enormous expansion of railroad lines in the late 19th century and were instrumental in turn-of-the-century highway construction as well. The trusses form vertical sides to the bridge, connected to one another by traverse beams, and by stingers and other members which support the deck. Each truss always includes a top and bottom chord, the major beams which resist the bending induced by stresses on the bridge. The top and bottom are connected by some combination of vertical and/or diagonal members, usually both, as well as by major beams at each end, called endposts.

=== Pratt truss forms ===
The Pratt truss form, invented in 1844 by Thomas and Caleb Pratt, is the most common truss form in California and the United States. This form first appeared as a "combination truss" built in wood and iron with wooden vertical members, chords, and endposts, and iron tension diagonals. The basic form changed to all-metal construction by the 1880s.

It retained the light metal diagonals but substituted heavier metal beams, posts, and chords for the wooden members. The most common Pratt type is the through truss in which the deck is carried on the lower chord, with overhead lateral supports connecting the top chords. Finally, the Pennsylvania Petit is a Pratt truss with a polygonal top chord and includes reinforcing sub-struts and sub-ties. These half-length members reinforced the diagonals and helped resist stresses.

== Summary ==
The current Fair Oaks Bridge is the third manifestation of an overpass over the American River and connects Fair Oaks to the greater Sacramento region. Once a major crossing over the American River, it has been bypassed by the construction of bridges at Sunrise and Hazel in the 1950s and 1960s. The bridge, however, continues to serve as a pedestrian and bicycle crossing and remains a cultural icon for the local community. On September 25, 2006, the keeper of the National Register of Historic Places listed the Old Fair Oaks Bridge as a National Historic Site. The bridge successfully listed under the Register's criterion A (associative history) and C (architectural significance).

== See also ==
- List of crossings of the Lower American River

== Additional references ==
While not meant to be an exhaustive list, see the following sources for more on the history of Fair Oaks, including the bridge:

Late 19th through early 20th centuries

1. Charles Henry Howard Collection. Bowdoin College Library. See, http://library.bowdoin.edu/arch/mss/chhg.shtml. 4
2. "Clarke, Crawford W." Bio Info File, 1-2, California History Room, Sacramento.
3. Howard, Charles H., editor. The Advance. Chicago: The Advance Co., 1867-1917. LC Control Number: sn 82007018, call number: Newspaper 7574-X, Library of Congress, Washington, D.C.
4. ________. The National Monthly Farm Press, Devoted to the Welfare of the Farmer and his Family; An Illustrated Agricultural Journal. Chicago: Howard-Wilson Publishing Co., [1895]. LC Control Number: ca 09000973, call number: S1 .N4, Library of Congress, Washington, D.C.
5. Howard & Wilson Publishing Company. Farm, Field and Fireside, 1892-1906. 15 Volumes. LC Control Number: 09009915, call number: S1 .N4. Library of Congress, Washington, D.C. Pieces of this collection can also be found at the Wisconsin Historical Society in Madison, as well as the New York Public Library and the Library of the New York Botanical Garden in New York City.
6. ________. Farm, Field and Stockman. LC Control Number: ca 09000972, call number: S1 .N4. Library of Congress, Washington, D.C. This collection is the predecessor of the Farm, Field and Fireside published by the Howard-Wilson Publishing Company.
7. McClatchy, Valentine S. V. S. McClatchy Letter Books, September 8, 1898 to April 24, 1900, Eleanor McClatchy Collection, SAMCC, Sacramento. # ________. V. S. McClatchy Letter Books, April 28, 1900 to January 21, 1902, Eleanor McClatchy Collection, Sacramento Archives and Museum Collections Center[5], Sacramento.

1890s

1. Buckley and Taylor (Sacramento, CA). Abstract of Title to the San Juan Tract, Sacramento County, California: On Which is Located the Farm, Field and Fireside's Sunset Colonies, Fair Oaks and Olive Park. [Sacramento, CA: Buckley and Taylor, 1895]. California History Room, Sacramento.
2. Davis, Winfield J. An Illustrated History of Sacramento County, California: Containing a History of Sacramento County from the Earliest Period of its Occupancy to the Present Time. Chicago: Lewis Publishing Company, 1890.
3. Howard & Wilson Publishing Company. The Heart of California. Chicago: Howard-Wilson Publishing Company, 1897. Sacramento Collection, Sacramento Room, Sacramento.
4. Howard & Wilson Publishing Company. Sunset Colonies: Fair Oaks and Olive Park, In the Heart of California / Farm, Field and Fireside and Western Rural, Colony Department. Chicago: Farm, Field and Fireside and Western Rural, Colony Dept., 1896. Sacramento Collection, Sacramento Room, Sacramento.
5. McClatchy, James & Company. Sacramento County and its Resources: A Souvenir of the Bee. Sacramento: H. S. Crocker Company, 1894.
6. Sacramento Board of Supervisors and Sacramento Chamber of Commerce. Resources of Sacramento County, California. Sacramento, CA: Sacramento Board of Supervisors and Sacramento Chamber of Commerce, [1899]. California History Room, Sacramento.
7. Sacramento City and County Directory, 1893. Dallas, Texas: R.L. Polk & Co., 1893.
8. Wilson, James W. Farm, Field, and Fireside's Financial Catechism. Chicago: Howard-Wilson Publishing Co., [1896]). LC Control: ca 07006659, call number HG562 .W77 1896, Library of Congress, Washington, D.C.
9. ________. Wilson's Financial Catechism. Chicago: Howard-Wilson Publishing Co., 1898. On microfiche, microfc E178.P24 1978, Regenstein, Microforms, Floor 3, University of Chicago Library, Chicago, Illinois.

1900s

1. Bryan, William H. Souvenir of the Capital of California: Sacramento City and Country as seen through the Camera. Issued by the Sacramento Union. San Francisco: Stanley-Taylor Co., 1901. California History Room, Sacramento.
2. Davis, Winfield. Sacramento County, California: Its Resources and Advantages. Sacramento, CA: Board of Supervisors of Sacramento County, 1905.
3. Fair Oaks Development Company. Fair Oaks, California: The Paradise of the Fruit Grower, Health Seeker and Tourist. In the Valley of the Celebrated Gold-Bearing American River, Fourteen Miles from Sacramento. Sacramento: The Fair Oaks Development Company, 1900. California History Room, Sacramento.
4. Fair Oaks Fruit Company. 1901-1902. A Record Book of Director's Meetings for the Fair Oaks Fruit Company. Sacramento Collection, Sacramento Room, Sacramento.
5. ________. 1902-1908. A Record Book of Director's Meetings for the Fair Oaks Fruit Company. Sacramento Collection, Sacramento Room, Sacramento.
6. Fairoaks [sic] Library Association. Miscellaneous Documents. Fair Oaks, CA: The Association, 1908-1921. Sacramento Collection, Sacramento Room, Sacramento.
7. Houghton, A. N. Map of Fair Oaks City in Sacramento County California. Boston: A.N. Houghton, 1900. Available at California History Room, Sacramento.
8. Irvine, Leigh Hadley. A History of the New California: Its Resources and People. New York: Lewis Publishing Co., 1905.
9. Sacramento Chamber of Commerce. Resources of Sacramento County, California. Sacramento, CA: Press of the H. S. Crocker Co., [1903]. California History Room, Sacramento.
10. ________. Sacramento and its Tributary County. Sacramento, CA: Sacramento Chamber of Commerce, [1904]. Sacramento Room, Sacramento.
11. ________. Fruit Growing is California's Greatest Industry: Sacramento County is the Very Heart of its Greatest Production; Possesses a Climate Unsurpassed for its Equilibrity. Sacramento, CA: Sacramento Chamber of Commerce, [1904]. California History Room, Sacramento.
12. Sacramento City and County Directory, 1901. Dallas, Texas: R.L. Polk & Co., 1901.

1910s

1. Bates, J. C., editor. History of the Bench and Bar of California. San Francisco: Bench and Bar Publishing Company, 1912.
2. Greater Sacramento: Her Achievements, Resources and Possibilities. Sacramento, CA: Kelman & Company, 1912. Sacramento Room, Sacramento.
3. Sacramento County Board of Supervisors. Sacramento County in the Heart of California. Issued under direction of the Board of Supervisors and Exposition Commissioners of Sacramento County. Sacramento, CA: Alvord & Young, [1915]. Sacramento Room, Sacramento.
4. Sacramento Valley and Foothill Counties of California. Compiled and edited by Emmett Phillips and John H. Miller. Under the direction of the Sacramento Valley Exposition. Sacramento, CA: Sacramento Valley Exposition, 1915.
5. Sacramento Valley Development Association. Sacramento Valley, California. San Francisco: Sunset Magazine Homeseekers' Bureau, [1911]. California History Room, Sacramento.
6. Who's Who in the Pacific Southwest: A Compilation of Authentic Biographical Sketches of Citizens of Southern California and Arizona. Los Angeles: Times-Mirror Print & Binding House, 1913.
7. Willis, William Ladd. History of Sacramento County, California: With Biographical Sketches of the Leading Men and Women of the County who have been Identified with its Growth and Development from the Early Days to the Present. Los Angeles, CA: Historic Record Company, 1913.

1920s

1. Howard, Otis McGaw. General Charles H. Howard: A Short Outline of a Useful Life. Chicago: Privately Printed, 1925.
2. Reed, Walter, editor. History of Sacramento County, California: With Biographical Sketches of the Leading Men and Women of the County Who Have Been Identified with its Growth and Development from the Early Days to the Present. Los Angeles: Historic Record Company, 1923. Sacramento Chamber of Commerce. Industrial Survey of Sacramento, 1925. [Sacramento, CA]: Sacramento Chamber of Commerce, 1925. California History Room, Sacramento.
3. Sacramento Chamber of Commerce. Sacramento, California: The World's Garden Valley. Sacramento: Anderson Printing Co., [1926]. California History Room, Sacramento.

1930s

1. Wooldridge, Jesse Walton. History of the Sacramento Valley, California. Chicago: Pioneer Historical Publishing Company, 1931. Sacramento Room, Sacramento.

1940s

1. Lord, Myrtle Shaw. A Sacramento Saga: Fifty Years of Achievement—Chamber of Commerce Leadership. Sacramento: Sacramento Chamber of Commerce, News Publishing Company, 1946.
2. Sacramento Chamber of Commerce. Hub of Western Industry: Sacramento, California. Sacramento, CA: Sacramento Chamber of Commerce, 1944. Sacramento Room, Sacramento.

1950s

1. Orange Vale Water Company. Information Bulletin. Orangevale, CA: Orange Vale Water Company, 1958.

1960s

1. History of Sacramento County, California. With Illustrations and with introduction by Allan R. Ottley. Berkeley, CA: Howell-North, 1960. Sacramento Room, Sacramento.
2. McGowan, Joseph A. History of the Sacramento Valley. 3 vols. New York: Lewis Historical Publishing Company, 1961.
3. Menefee, Selden, Patricia Fitzgerald, and Geraldine Fitzgerald, editors. Fair Oaks and San Juan Area Memories. Fair Oaks, CA: San Juan Record Press, 1960.
4. Wright, George, editor. History of Sacramento County. Berkeley, CA: Howell-North, 1960.

1970s

1. Fair Oaks Woman's Thursday Club. Fair Oaks: The Way it Was, 1895-1976. [Fair Oaks, CA: Woman's Thursday Club of Fair Oaks, 1976]. Reprint,
2. Fair Oaks, CA: Fair Oaks Historical Society, 2007, available online on the Fair Oaks Historical Society Webpage at http://www.fairoakshistory.org.
3. Sacramento County Planning Department. The Fair Oaks Community Plan. Adopted by the Sacramento County Board of Supervisors, Resolution no. 75-12, January 8, 1975.

1980s

1. Comstock, Timothy W. The Sutter Club: One Hundred Years. Sacramento: The Sutter Club, 1989.
2. California Department of Transportation. Request for Determination of Eligibility for Inclusion in the National Register. Report submitted to the California SHPO. Sacramento: California Department of Transportation, 1985. Report on file with the California SHPO. Fair Oaks Guide. Contributing writers Judy Kemper, Hugh Gorman, Maggie Upton. Fair Oaks, CA: P. D. Willey, 1984. California History Room, Sacramento.
3. Fair Oaks Guide. [Fair Oaks, CA]: Fair Oaks Chamber of Commerce, 1988. California History Room, Sacramento. The History of St. Mel's Catholic Church, Fair Oaks, California, 1921-1985. Tappan, NY: Custombook, 1985. On file at the Fair Oaks Library; and St. Mel's Catholic Church, Fair Oaks, CA.

1990s

1. California Department of Transportation. Historic Bridges of California. Sacramento: California Department of Transportation, 1990. On file at Caltrans Library, Sacramento.
2. Colwell, Neal T. "The Cultural Landscape of Fair Oaks." B.A. in Environmental Studies, University of California, Santa Cruz, 1993. On file at the Fair Oaks Public Library, Fair Oaks, CA; and the California History Room, Sacramento.
3. Fair Oaks Historical Society. Fair Oaks: The Early Years. Fair Oaks, CA: Fair Oaks Historical Society, Centennial History Book Committee, 1995.
4. Final Environmental Impact Report for Fair Oaks Bluff Overlook. Prepared by the County of Sacramento Department of Environmental Review and Assessment. Sacramento, CA: The Department, 1991. Sacramento Collection, Sacramento Room, Sacramento.

2000s

1. Abbott, Steve. "A History of Fair Oaks." Fair Oaks, CA: Fair Oaks Historical Society, 2005. Accessible online at http://www.fairoakshistory.org.
2. Avella, Steven M. Sacramento: Indomitable City. Charleston, SC: Arcadia Publishing, 2003.
3. Citizens to Save the Bluffs. "History." SaveTheBluffs.org, Citizens to Save the Bluffs, Fair Oaks, CA, December 31, 2005. Available online at www.savethebluffs.org/ pages/321131/index.htm.
4. Fair Oaks Historical Society. Newsletters. All issues published in the first decade of the 21st century are available online at the Fair Oaks Historical Society webpage, http://www.fairoakshistory.org/.
5. Fair Oaks Presbyterian Church. Fair Oaks Presbyterian Church: Celebrating 50 Years, 1952-2002. Fair Oaks, CA: The Church, 2002. On file at the Fair Oaks Library; and Fair Oaks Presbyterian Church, Fair Oaks, CA.
6. Hayes, Peter J., editor. The Lower American River: Prehistory to Parkway. Carmichael, CA: American River Natural History Association, 2005.
7. Pitzer, Gary. 150 Years of Water: The History of the San Juan Water District. Prepared by the Water Education Foundation. Sacramento: The
8. Foundation, distributed by San Juan Water District, Granite Bay, 2004.
9. Simpson, Lee M. A. and Paul J. P. Sandul. Fair Oaks. Charleston, SC: Arcadia Publishing, 2006.
10. Whitlatch, Amy. "Fair Oaks Historical Society: Building a History Center." M.A. Thesis, Public History, Department of History, California State University, Sacramento, 2003.
