= Tehama Railroad Bridge =

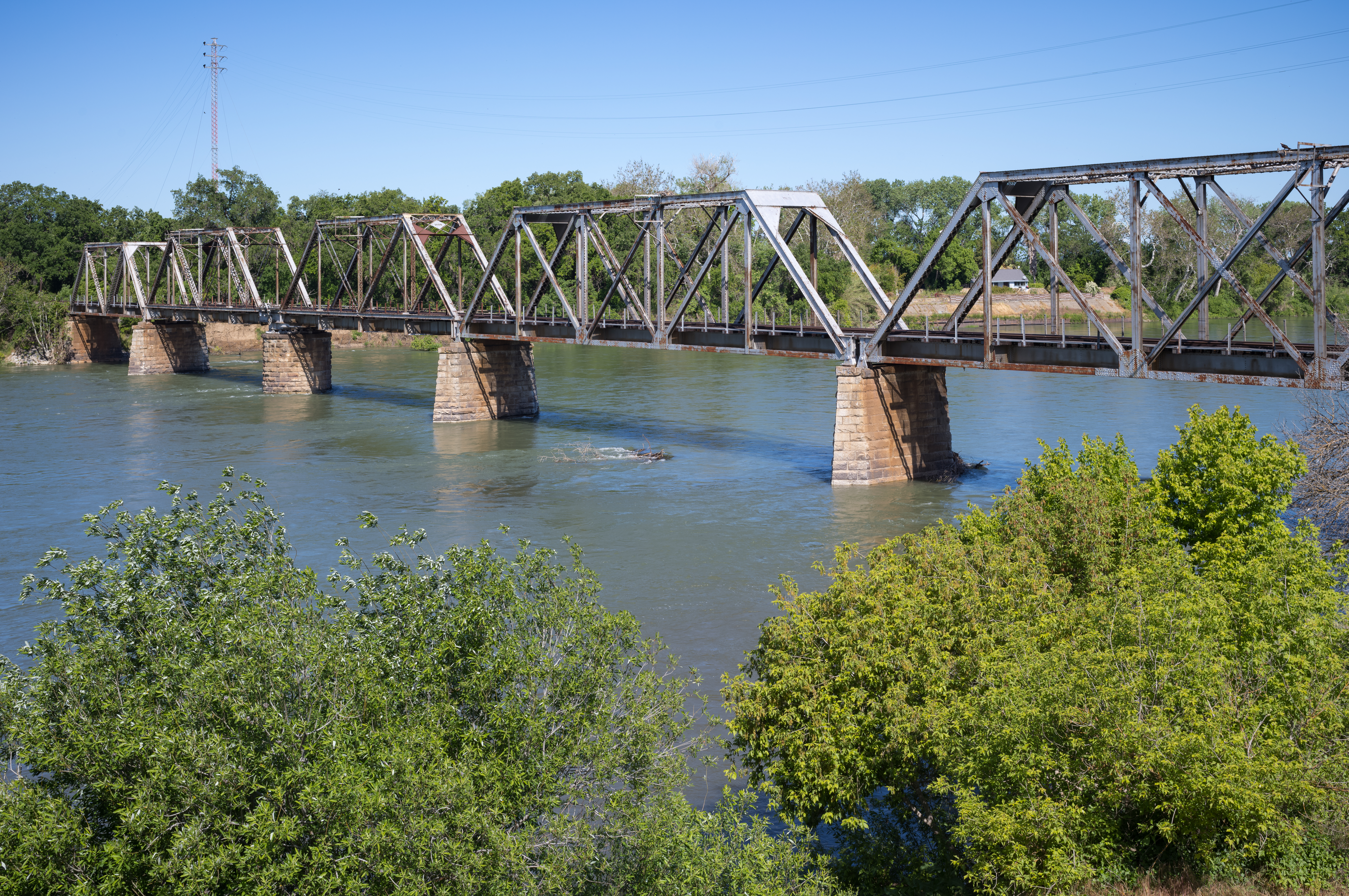
- Coordinates: 40°01′43″N 122°07′10″W
- Carries: Union Pacific Railroad
- Crosses: Sacramento River
- Locale: Tehama, California
- Official name: Tehama Railroad Bridge
- Named for: Tehama, California
- Maintained by: Union Pacific Railroad

Characteristics
- Design: First Iteration:Howe Truss
- Total length: First Iteration: 800 ft (240 m)

Location
- Interactive map of Tehama Railroad Bridge

The Tehama Railroad Bridge is a railroad bridge that crosses the Sacramento River. It is located next the town of Tehama, California.

== History ==
Beginning in September 1870, a surveying crew for the California and Oregon Railroad, at that point a subsidiary of the Central Pacific Railroad, began working in the area around Tehama, California for a new railroad bridge that would also allow for wagons to cross. By June 1871, work crews for the railroad had finally reached the town of Tehama. The railroad was built through the town's Chinatown quarter.

By June 4, the work to construct this first iteration of the bridge had commenced. Materials for construction of the railroad bridge and surrounding right of way began arriving in the following weeks, with up to 60 bridge builders being brought in, alongside a grading work crew. It took these work crews a little over two months to complete the work, eventually finishing on August 12, 1871.

The first train to cross the bridge was the locomotive "Falcon", and then the "Clipper" locomotive, which had attached to it a baggage and passenger car. Regular passenger trains would not arrive in Tehama for several days because the depot was not completed at the time of the bridge's completion.

In 1872, the bridge was damaged by heavy rains, with the draw pier and west spans suffering the most damage, causing the bridge to be out of operation for several weeks. Due to this, and the following delays in fixing the movable bridge, it was proposed in the State Legislature to allow the Central Pacific Railroad to replace the bridge with one that does not move. This caused an enormous outrage in the communities north of Tehama on the Sacramento River, such as Red Bluff, which would have been cut off from riverboat traffic. This proposal was approved by the state legislature, however Governor Newton Booth vetoed the bill. Within the next month the bridge was repaired.

== See also ==
- List of crossings of the Sacramento River

== Gallery ==
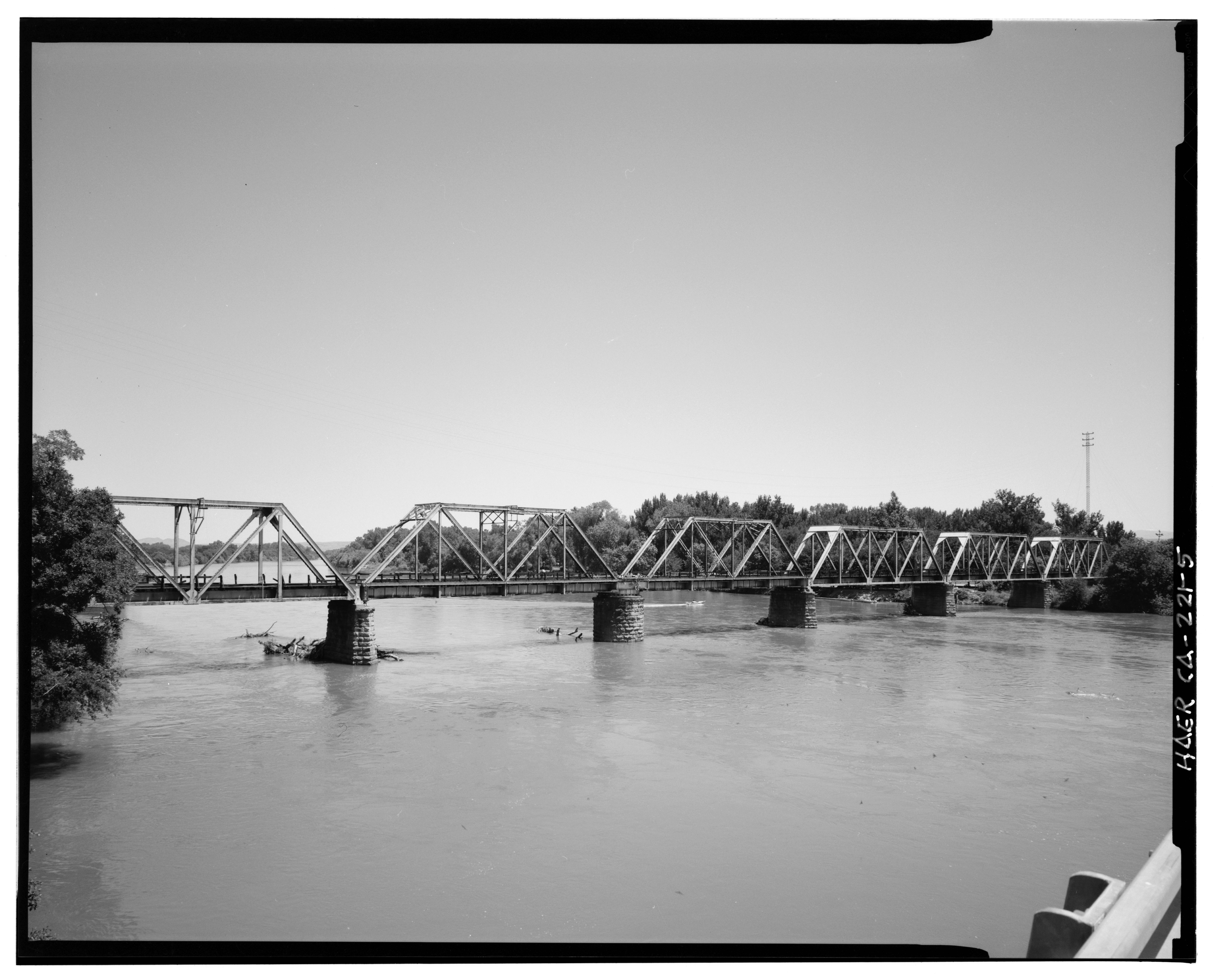
View of Tehama Railroad Bridge

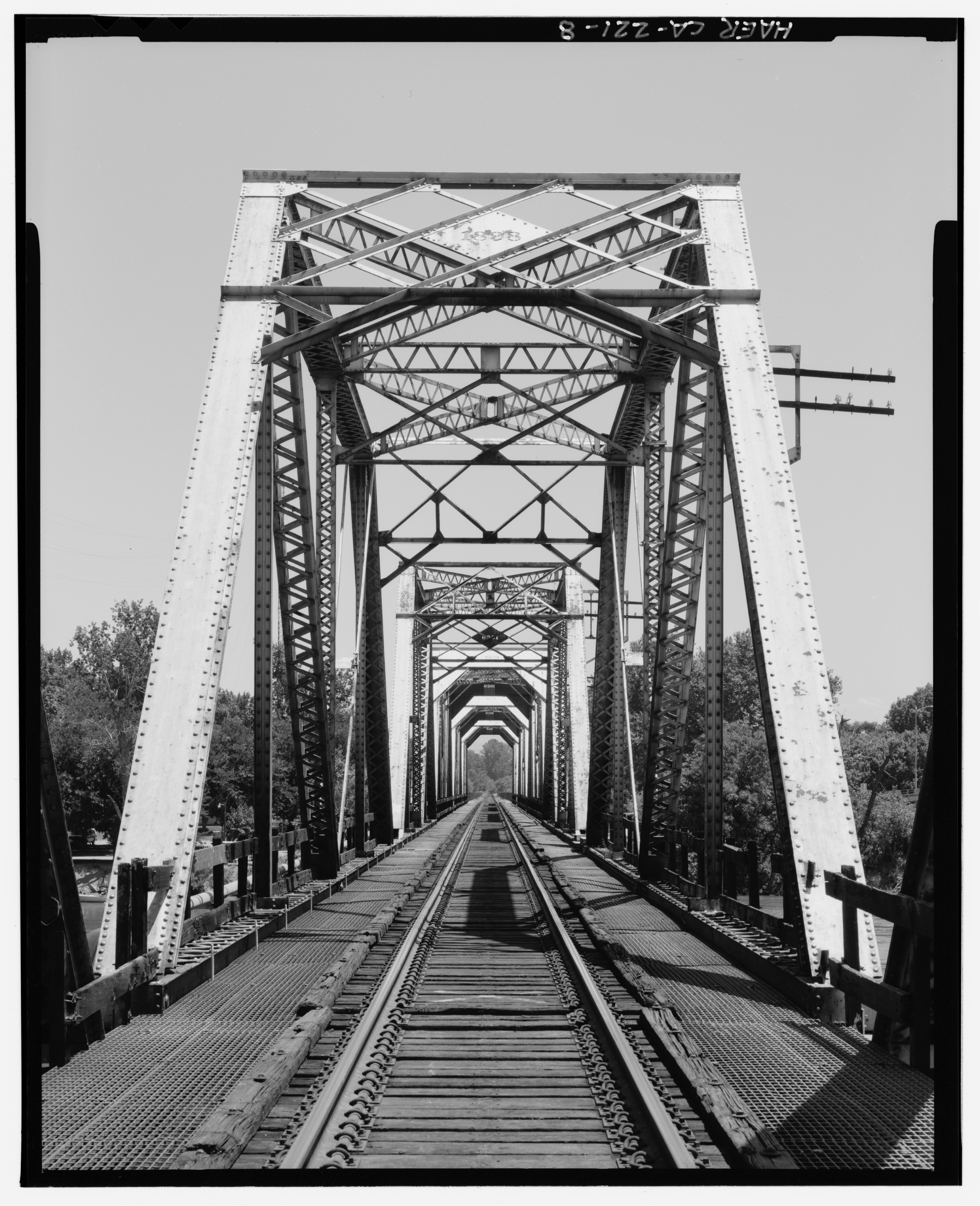
East portal of 1898 swing span of Bridge Number 210.52

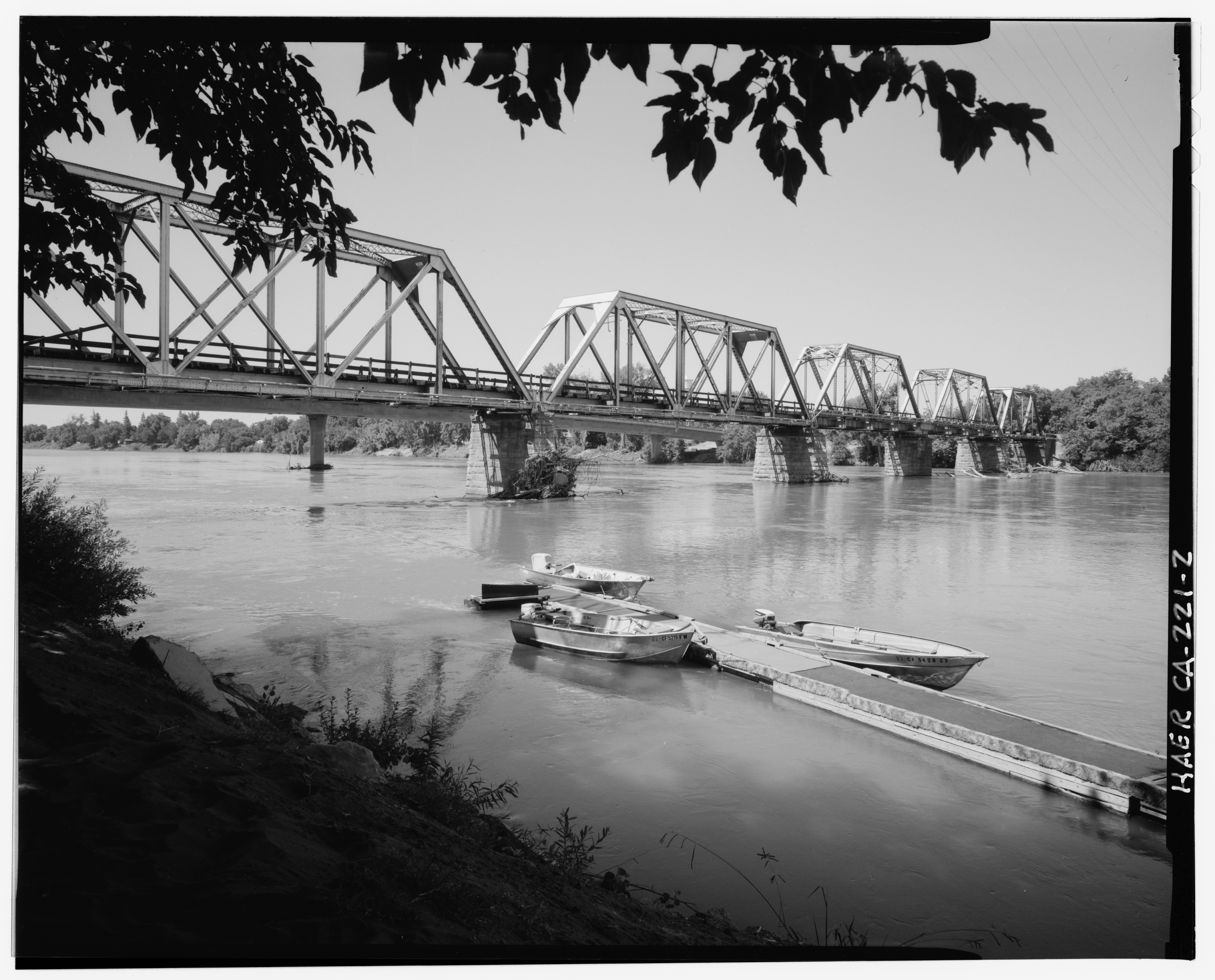
West end of Bridge Number 210.52

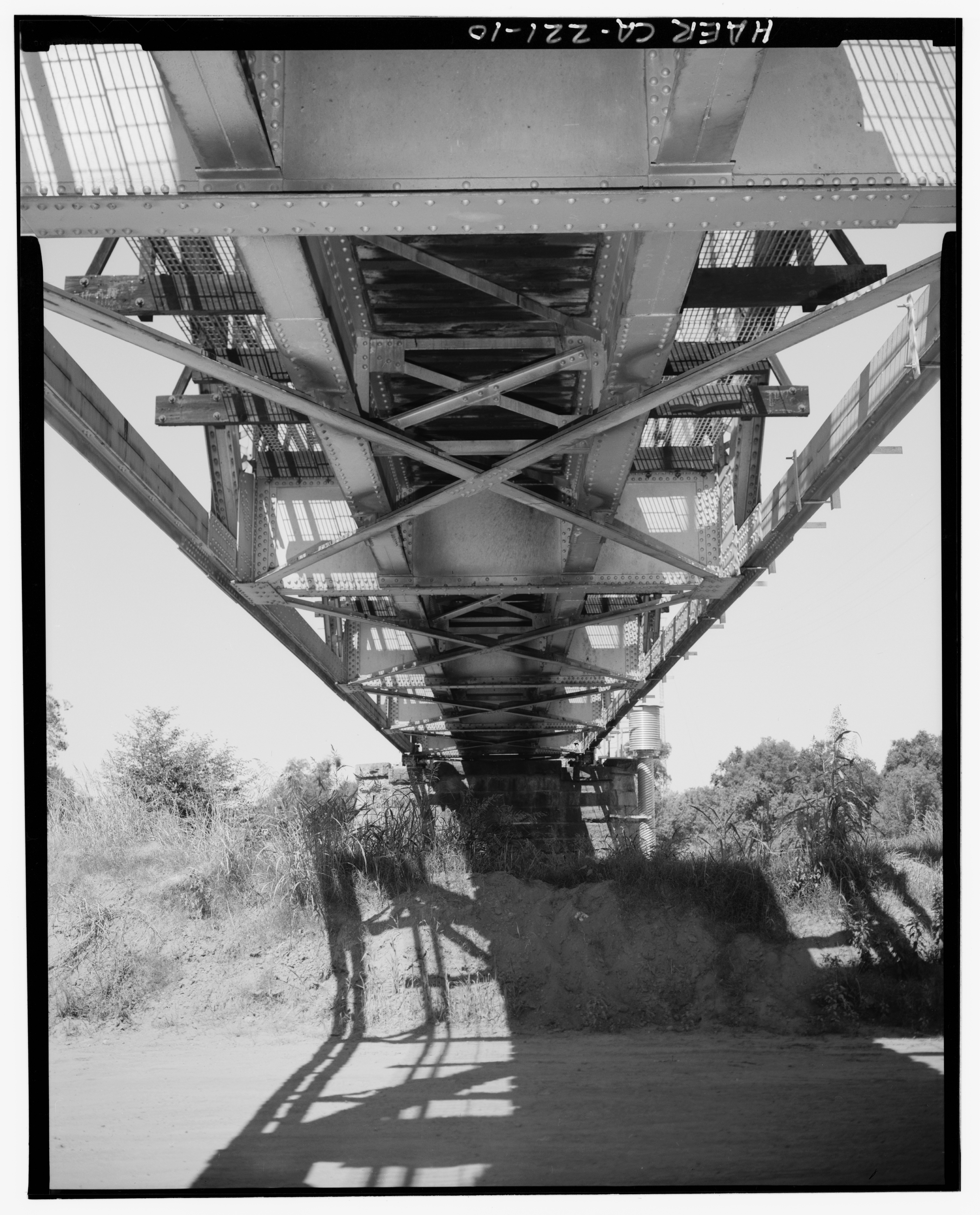
Detail, axial view of underfloor of one of the western 1929 approach spans of Bridge Number 210.52
