= Jedediah Smith Memorial Trail =

Paved multi-use pathway

Coordinates: 38°36′25″N 121°30′06″W

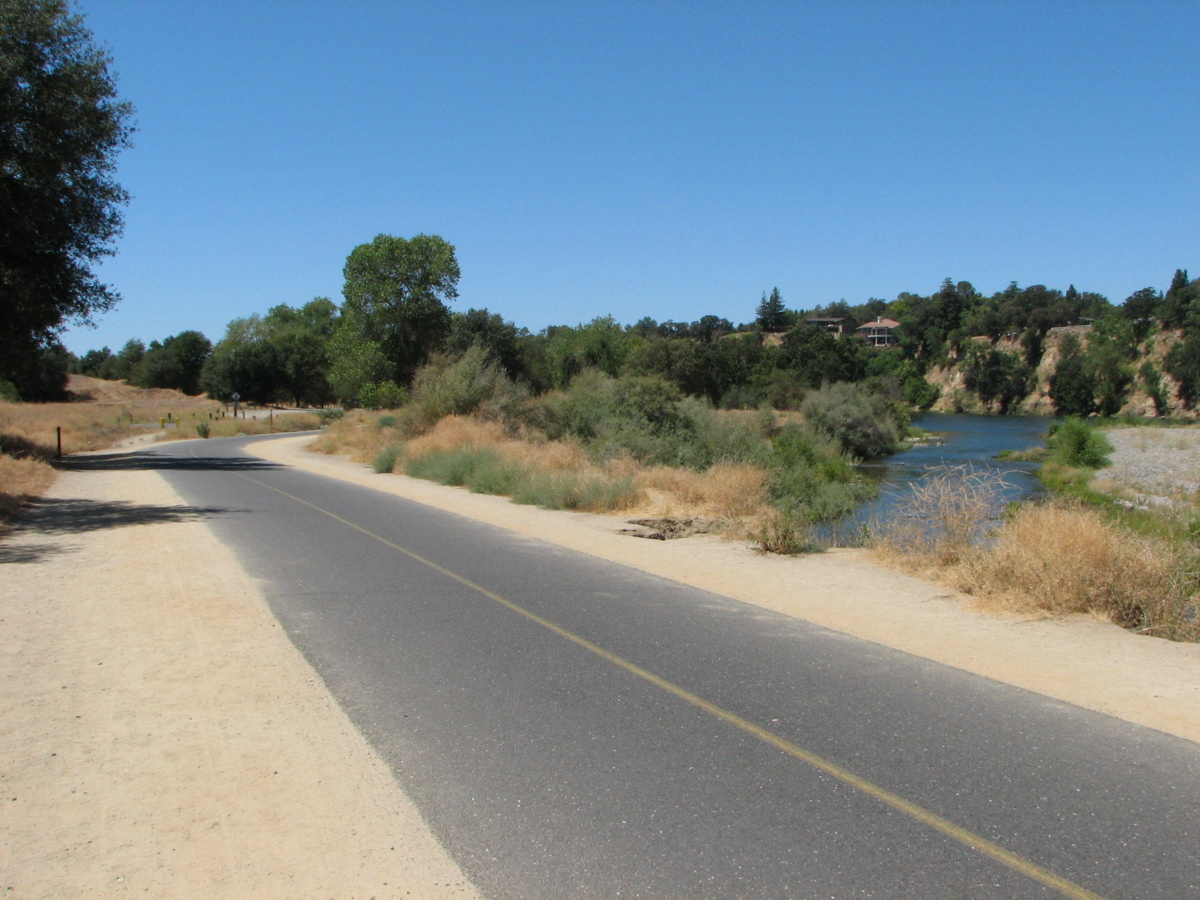

The Jedediah Smith Memorial Trail (or American River Bike Trail) is a paved multi-use pathway that runs between the confluence of the Sacramento River with the American River, just north of downtown Sacramento, California, and Beal's Point at Folsom Lake, north of Folsom. The trail is 32 miles (51 km) long and is used as a major recreational destination, as well as a commuter artery for cyclists. The trail is considered one of the longest paved purpose-built bike trails in the country. The trail is maintained by the County of Sacramento and is painted with mile markers placed at every half-mile increment.

== History ==
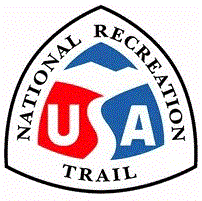
National Recreation Trail

In the early 19th century, the famous fur trapper Jedediah Smith explored the area east of Sacramento, between the settlement at the confluence now known as Old Sacramento and Folsom. The area follows the course of the American River and is rich in a diversity of wildlife. In the late 19th century, the trail was marked out by a prototype cycling organization, The Capital City Wheelmen, but was soon abandoned as a viable commuter artery with the onset of automobiles in the early 20th century. The trail fell into disrepair until it was reexamined as a transportation route by cyclists in the 1970s, when the pathway was paved. A section of the trail was later added that runs along the south side of Lake Natoma and into downtown Folsom.

The trail is used by approximately 5 million people annually.

== Notable landmarks and attractions ==
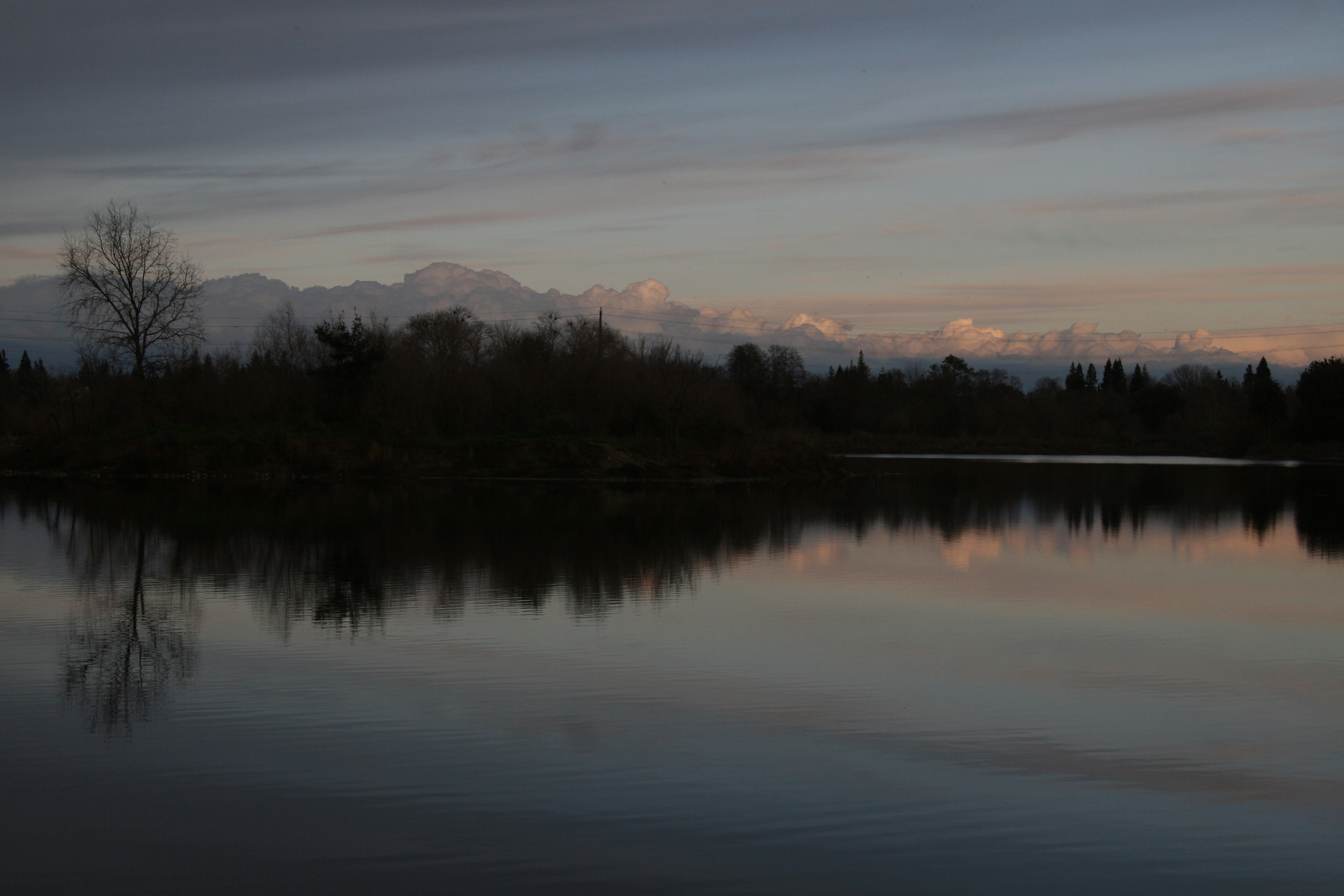
William Pond Recreation Area

The trail passes several places of interest between Sacramento and Folsom. The recreational areas of Discovery Park, Sutter's Landing Park (the point at which John Sutter, founder of Sacramento and notable area entrepreneur, first arrived), the Guy West Bridge (a scaled-down reproduction of San Francisco's Golden Gate Bridge), California State University, Sacramento (or, more commonly, Sacramento State), William B. Pond Recreation Area, River Bend Park, the Fair Oaks walking bridge, the Nimbus Fish Hatchery, Lake Natoma, and Folsom Lake.

The trail runs through various parks and untouched areas, inhabited by a variety of animals. Throughout the trail, animals such as deer, western rattlesnakes, and woodpeckers can be found, amongst others. As of 2020, coyotes are becoming more common along the trail and are increasingly acclimated to the presence of people.

== Connections to the trail ==
=== Discovery Park ===
The western terminus of the trail is at the Jibboom Street Bridge across the American River in Discovery Park. Immediately across that bridge is Tiscornia Park, where the Sacramento River Bike Trail has its northern terminus and the Two Rivers Bike Trail has its western terminus. The Sacramento River Bike Trail parallels the river and passes Old Sacramento and Miller Park, connects to the Del Rio Trail, and reaches the Pocket Area. Natomas Park Drive provides access to the trail and to Discovery Park from the north. A bike trail on the south side of the Garden Highway provides access to Natomas Park Drive from the west.

=== Northgate Blvd and Del Paso Blvd area ===
The trail can be accessed from both sides of Northgate Blvd. just south of the Arden Garden Connector. The trail has a level crossing of Del Paso Blvd and connects to the northbound section of the Sacramento Northern Bike Trail just northwest of that crossing and the southbound section just southeast of that crossing. The northbound direction of the Sacramento Northern Bike trail parallels Traction Avenue for a distance. The southbound Sacramento Northern Bike Trail crosses the river on the Pipe's bridge and reaches the Midtown district on C Street east of 19th Street. There are several access points from Lathrop Way just to the east of Del Paso Blvd.

=== Cal Expo to Watt Avenue area ===
The trail can be accessed at the eastern end of Tribute Road, from near the western end of the Cal Expo parking lot, from Ethan Way, from Northrup Avenue, and from Spanos Court. The trail can be accessed near each of the Fair Oaks Blvd Bridge, the Guy West Bridge, the Howe Avenue Bridge, and the Watt Avenue Bridge, as well as from Kadema Drive.

=== Watt Avenue to Arden Way area ===
Access points exist at Estate Drive, Ashton Drive, Rio Americano High School, Jacob Lane, Harrington Way, and River Walk Way. The trail traverses William B. Pond Recreational Area, which can be reached from the eastern end of Arden Way. At that point, the trail crosses the river on the Harold Richey Memorial Bridge.

=== Rancho Cordova to Hazel Avenue area ===
An access point with parking exists at Rod Beaudry Drive. Access points exist at Dedo Way, Chase Drive, Rossmoor Drive, El Manto Drive, Ambassador Drive, Yukon River Drive, Moose River Court, and South Bridge Street off of Sunrise Blvd. The Fair Oaks Bridge connects the trail to the eastern end of Fair Oaks Blvd. Access points exist at Gold Country Blvd. Gold Strike Drive, Gold Bar Drive, Nimbus Road, and Hazel Avenue.

=== Lake Natoma to Folsom Lake area ===
The trail splits to go up both sides of Lake Natoma, forming a loop. On the south side of the lake, access points exist from Folsom Blvd opposite Aerojet Road, Iron Point Road, and Natoma Station Drive and from Parkshore Drive, Young Wo Circle, and Gold Lake Drive. The trail crosses Greenback Lane at Scott Street and crosses the end of the lake just east of Greenback, completing the loop.

On the north side of the lake, access points exist on both sides of the Hazel Avenue bridge. Access points exist at Vista Del Rio Avenue, Sunset Avenue, Main Avenue, Mississippi Bar Drive, Snipes Blvd, Snowberry Way, American River Canyon Drive, Park Road, at the corner of Folsom Blvd and Greenback Lane, and from the north side of Greenback Lane near the bridge. Access points exist at Mountain Oak Court, Berry Creek Drive, Folsom Dam Road and Beals Point.
