= List of crossings of the Sacramento River =

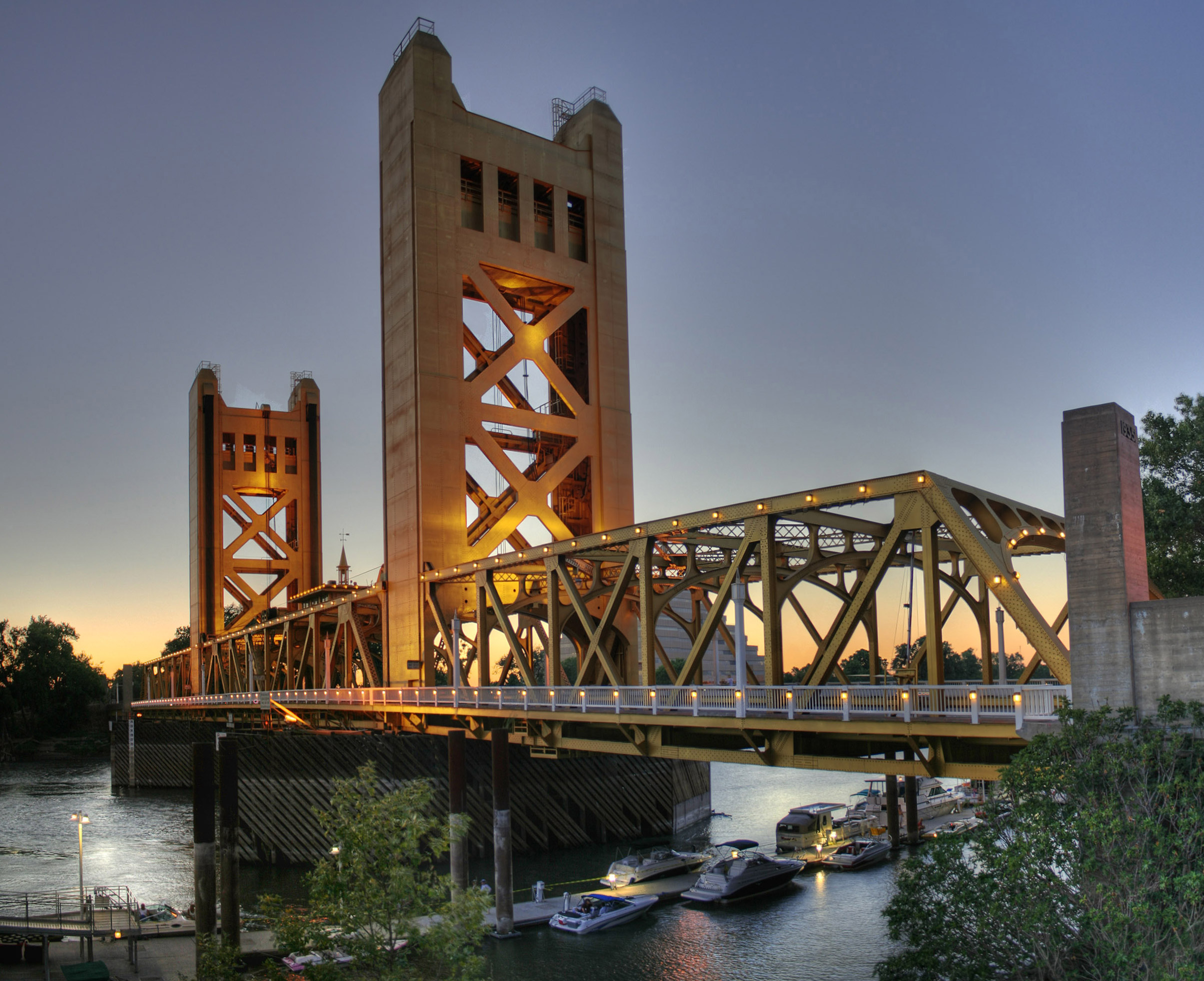
Tower Bridge (California)

This is a list of the crossings of the Sacramento River from its mouth at Suisun Bay upstream to the Ribbon Bridge in Redding. There are many more bridges north of this point up to Lake Siskiyou, immediately east of the source of the river at the confluence of the South and Middle Forks of the Sacramento River. All locations are in California.

== Crossings ==
Crossing	NBI	Carries	Location	Built	Notes	Coordinates
Rio Vista Bridge	23 0024	SR 12	Rio Vista and Sacramento County	1944, reconstructed 1960	Vertical lift bridge	38°09′28″N 121°40′53″W
Isleton Bridge	24 0051	SR 160	Near Isleton	1923, reconstructed 1953	Bascule bridge by Joseph Baermann Strauss	38°10′19″N 121°35′38″W
Walnut Grove Bridge	24C0005	County Route J11	Walnut Grove, California	1952	Bascule bridge	38°14′32″N 121°30′54″W
Paintersville Bridge	24 0053	SR 160	Paintersville, California	1923, reconstructed 1952	Bascule bridge	38°19′07″N 121°34′40″W
Freeport Bridge	24C0001	Freeport Bridge Road	Sacramento, California	1929, reconstructed 1955	Bascule bridge	38°27′21″N 121°30′07″W
Pioneer Memorial Bridge	24 0004L / 24 0004R	I-80 BL / US 50	Yolo County and Sacramento	1966, reconstructed 1971	Twin span deck girder bridges	38°34′17″N 121°30′58″W
Tower Bridge	22 0021	SR 275	West Sacramento and Sacramento	1934	Vertical lift, most famous bridge in Sacramento	38°34′50″N 121°30′30″W
I Street Bridge	22C0153	I street, formerly SR 16	West Sacramento and Sacramento	1911	Swing bridge	38°35′11″N 121°30′25″W
Caltrans Maintenance Worker Memorial Bridge	22 0026L / 22 0026R	I-80	West Sacramento and Sacramento	1971	aka Bryte Bend Bridge	38°35′54″N 121°32′52″W
Vietnam Servicemen Memorial Bridge	22 0025L / 22 0025R	I-5	Yolo County and Sacramento	1969	aka Elkhorn Bridge	38°40′24″N 121°37′36″W
Knights Landing Bridge	22 0040	SR 113	Knights Landing	1933, rehabilitated 1949	Bascule	38°48′09″N 121°43′12″W
Meridian Bridge	18 0008	SR 20	Meridian	1977	Swing bridge	39°08′44″N 121°55′04″W
Highway bridge	15C0001	River Road	Colusa	1980	Replaced swing through-truss	39°12′52″N 122°00′01″W
Highway bridge	11 0017	SR 162	Butte City	1948, rehabilitated 1961		39°27′26″N 121°59′43″W
Ord Ferry Road Bridge	12C0120	Ord Ferry Road	Butte County	1977		39°37′45″N 121°59′33″W
Gianella Bridge	12 0054	SR 32	Hamilton City	1911, reconstructed 1987		39°45′04″N 121°59′48″W
Woodson Bridge	08C0006	South Avenue (County Road A9)	Corning	1975	Concrete box girder	39°54′33″N 122°05′32″W
Tehama Railroad Bridge	08C0002	Aramayo Way	Tehama	1977		40°01′41″N 122°07′10″W
Interstate 5 (II)	08 0095L / 08 0095R	I-5	Red Bluff	1964	Twin span	40°10′01″N 122°13′20″W
Antelope Boulevard Bridge	08 0023	SR 36	Red Bluff	1938, widened in 1971		40°10′41″N 122°13′52″W
Interstate 5 (I)	08 0096L / 08 0096R	I-5	Red Bluff	1964	Twin span	40°11′12″N 122°13′49″W
Bend Ferry Road Bridge	08C0017	Bend Ferry Road	Tehama County	1989		40°15′51″N 122°13′25″W
Jellys Ferry Road Bridge	08C0043	Jellys Ferry Road	Tehama County	1949	Through-truss	40°19′02″N 122°11′23″W
Ash Creek Road Bridge	06C0019	Shasta County Route A17	Cottonwood	1970		40°25′03″N 122°11′38″W
Deschutes Road Bridge	06C0041	Deschutes Road	Anderson	1970		40°27′46″N 122°14′38″W
North Street Bridge	06C0373	North Street	Anderson	2010	Prestressed concrete box girder	40°28′19″N 122°17′38″W
Interstate 5	06 0128	I-5	Anderson	2000	Twin span	40°28′19″N 122°18′40″W
South Bonnyview Road Bridge	06C0136R / 06C0136L	South Bonnyview Road	Redding	1978, twin bridge added in 1997 (eastbound traffic on new bridge)		40°32′20″N 122°21′28″W
Cypress Avenue Bridge	06C0108	Cypress Avenue	Redding	Currently being widened		40°34′20″N 122°22′23″W
Highway bridge	06 0206	SR 44	Redding	1965	Formerly SR 299	40°35′10″N 122°22′07″W
Sundial Bridge at Turtle Bay		Pedestrian and bicycle traffic	Redding	2004	Designed by Santiago Calatrava, support tower forms gnomon of a large, albeit inaccurate, sundial	40°35′32″N 122°22′39″W
Redding Police Officer Owen "Ted" Lyon Memorial Bridge	06 0014	SR 273 / SR 299	Redding	1935, widened 1961	Steel stringer	40°35′32″N 122°23′31″W
Redding Trestle		SP and UP railroads	Redding	1939	Warren deck truss	40°35′34″N 122°24′05″W
New Diestelhorst Bridge	06C0352	Benton Drive	Redding	1996	Open-spandrel arch	40°35′34″N 122°24′06″W
Diestelhorst Bridge		Pedestrian and bicycle traffic	Redding	1915	Concrete arch, closed to vehicular traffic in 1997	40°35′36″N 122°24′06″W
Ribbon Bridge		Pedestrian and bicycle traffic	Redding	1990	stress ribbon	40°36′05″N 122°26′39″W

== See also ==
- List of crossings of the Lower American River
