= Jibboom Street Bridge =

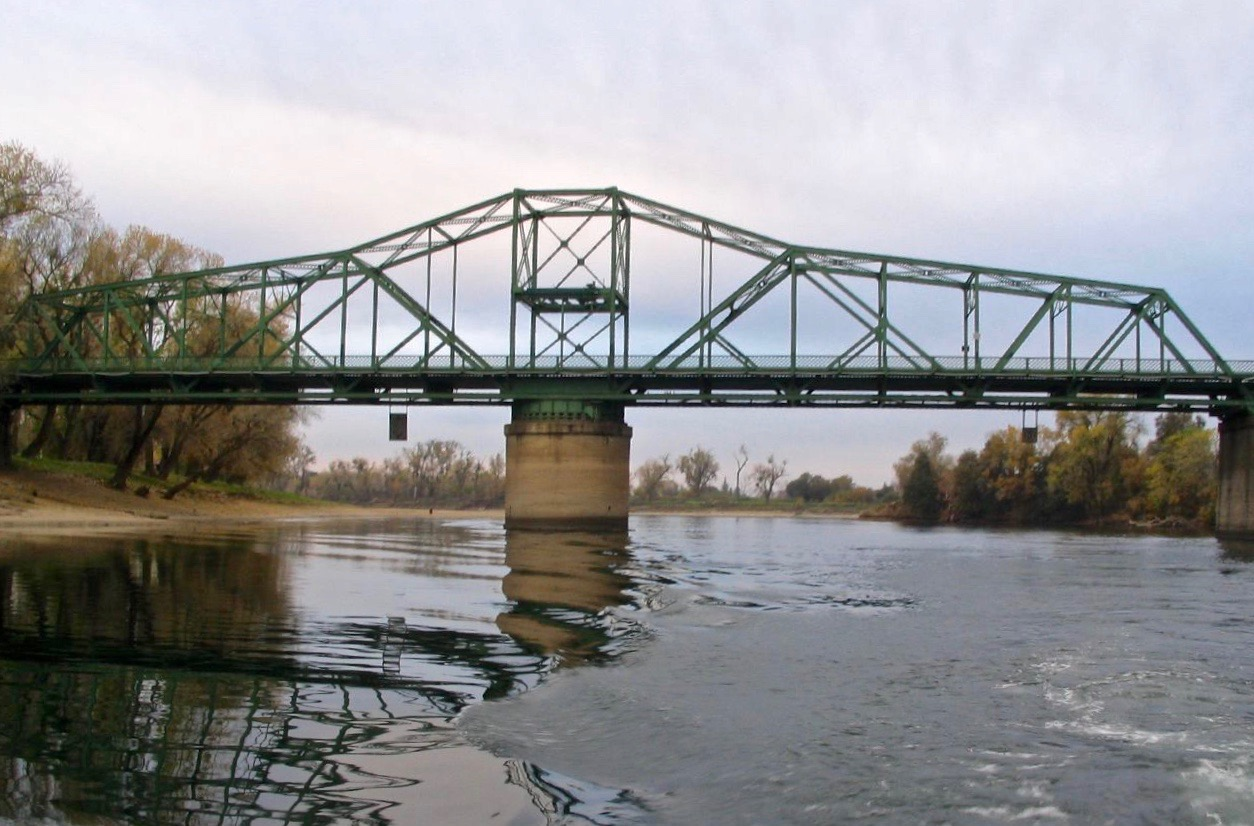
- Elevation of swing span from the river in 2004
- Coordinates: 38°35′59″N 121°30′22″W
- Carries: Jibboom Street
- Crosses: American River
- Locale: Sacramento, California
- Official name: Jibboom Street Bridge
- Other name: American River Swing Bridge

Characteristics
- Design: Metal subdivided warren truss swing bridge with Parker truss approach spans
- Material: Metal (steel)

History
- Opened: 1931; 95 years ago
- Closed: August 17, 2018—April 2, 2019

Statistics
- Toll: None

Location
- Interactive map of Jibboom Street Bridge

The Jibboom Street Bridge is a historic metal truss swing bridge located on Jibboom Street in Sacramento, California, crossing the American River in Sacramento County. The main swing span is flanked by two Parker through truss spans.

The bridge opened on Easter Sunday, April 5, 1931. Originally named the "American River Bridge," it allowed motorists to bypass the old Natomas Trestle, providing a more direct link to Sacramento from the Sacramento River Highway. The bridge's main central swing span was originally built as part of the Webster Street Bridge, connecting Oakland and Alameda. That bridge had been recently reconstructed following a January 1926 ship collision with its central swing span. Following the October 1928 opening of the Posey Tube, the Alameda County Board of Supervisors sold the Webster Street bridge at auction to Sacramento County. In late December, 1928, workers disassembled the central swing span and floated it to Antioch by barge where it remained until March 1930 when it was barged up the Delta to Sacramento.

The operator control house was removed by 1958, and the machinery that allowed it to swing was removed shortly after, rendering it permanently closed to marine traffic. Until the construction of the Interstate 5 viaduct parallel to it in 1968, the Jibboom Street Bridge carried most of the traffic northbound from Sacramento. In 1969 the bridge's original timber trestle northern approach was rebuilt with reinforced-concrete. This reconstruction significantly shortened the overall span, shifting its northern terminus from Garden Highway at levee height to Natomas Park Drive within the American River floodplain in Discovery Park. This alteration renders the bridge unusable at flood stages over 21.4 feet (6.5 m), as measured at the nearest gauge on the Sacramento River.

== See also ==
- List of crossings of the Lower American River
