= Effie Yeaw Nature Center =

Nature center in Carmichael, California

- Interactive map of Effie Yeaw Nature Center
- Location: Carmichael, California
- Coordinates: 38°37′03″N 121°18′42″W

Effie Yeaw Nature Center is a nature center inside Ancil Hoffman Park in the city of Carmichael, California. The Effie Yeaw Nature Center is part of the American River Parkway. The Effie Yeaw Nature Center is east of the city of Sacramento and has a replica of a Nisenan Tribe Village hut. The Nature Center is run by the American River Natural History Association.

The Nature Center is named in honor of Effie Yeaw, an educator and conservationist, who led tens of thousands of schoolchildren on field trips along the American River in Deterding Woods (now Ancil Hoffman Park), inspiring public appreciation that contributed to the establishment and conservation of the American River Parkway.

== See also ==
- Nisipowinan Village
