= Guy West Bridge =

Suspension bridge in Sacramento, California

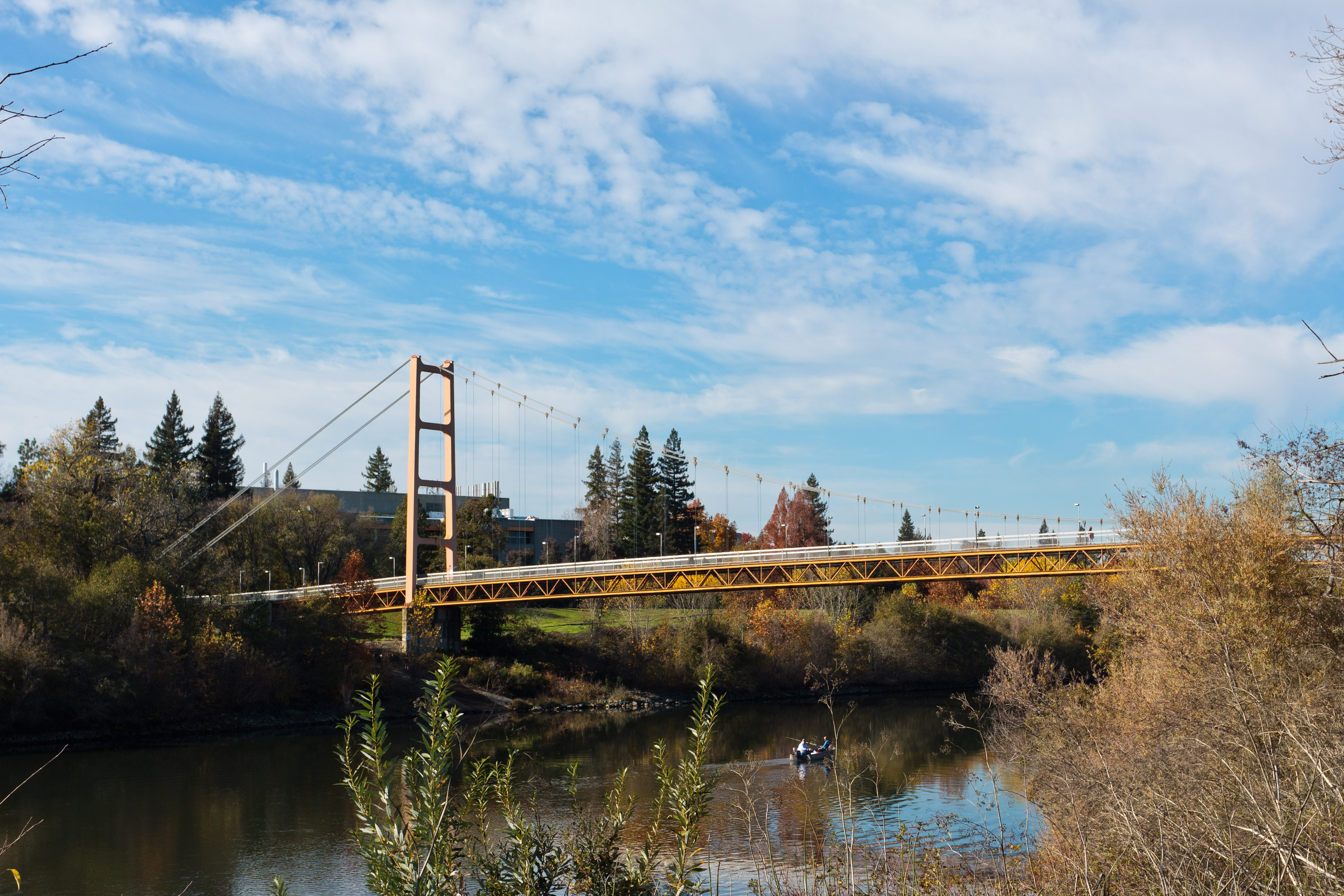
- Guy West Bridge
- Coordinates: 38.562202°N 121.420510°W
- Carries: pedestrian and bicycle traffic
- Crosses: American River
- Named for: Guy West
- Owner: City of Sacramento

Characteristics
- Design: Suspension bridge
- Total length: 1,144 feet (349 m)
- Width: 16 feet (4.9 m)
- Height: 87 feet (27 m)
- No. of spans: 1
- Piers in water: 2

History
- Designer: The Spink Corporation
- Constructed by: A. Teichert & Son
- Fabrication by: American Bridge Division, United States Steel Corporation
- Inaugurated: April 6, 1967

Location
- Interactive map of Guy West Bridge

The Guy West Bridge is a suspension bridge for pedestrian and bicycle traffic spanning the American River in Sacramento in Sacramento County, California, linking the campus of California State University, Sacramento with the neighboring Campus Commons student housing development. It was designed to resemble the Golden Gate Bridge, both in form and signature international orange color.

== History ==
The Guy West Bridge is named after the first president of Sacramento State, Guy West. At the time of its opening in 1967, the Guy West Bridge was hailed as the longest pedestrian suspension bridge in the United States. The bridge cost approximately US$636,000 (equivalent to $6,140,000 in 2025) to construct, and it was named a special prize winner in the 1968 AISC steel bridges contest. Steel for the bridge was supplied by U.S. Steel, American Bridge Division in South San Francisco, California.

=== Closures and repairs ===
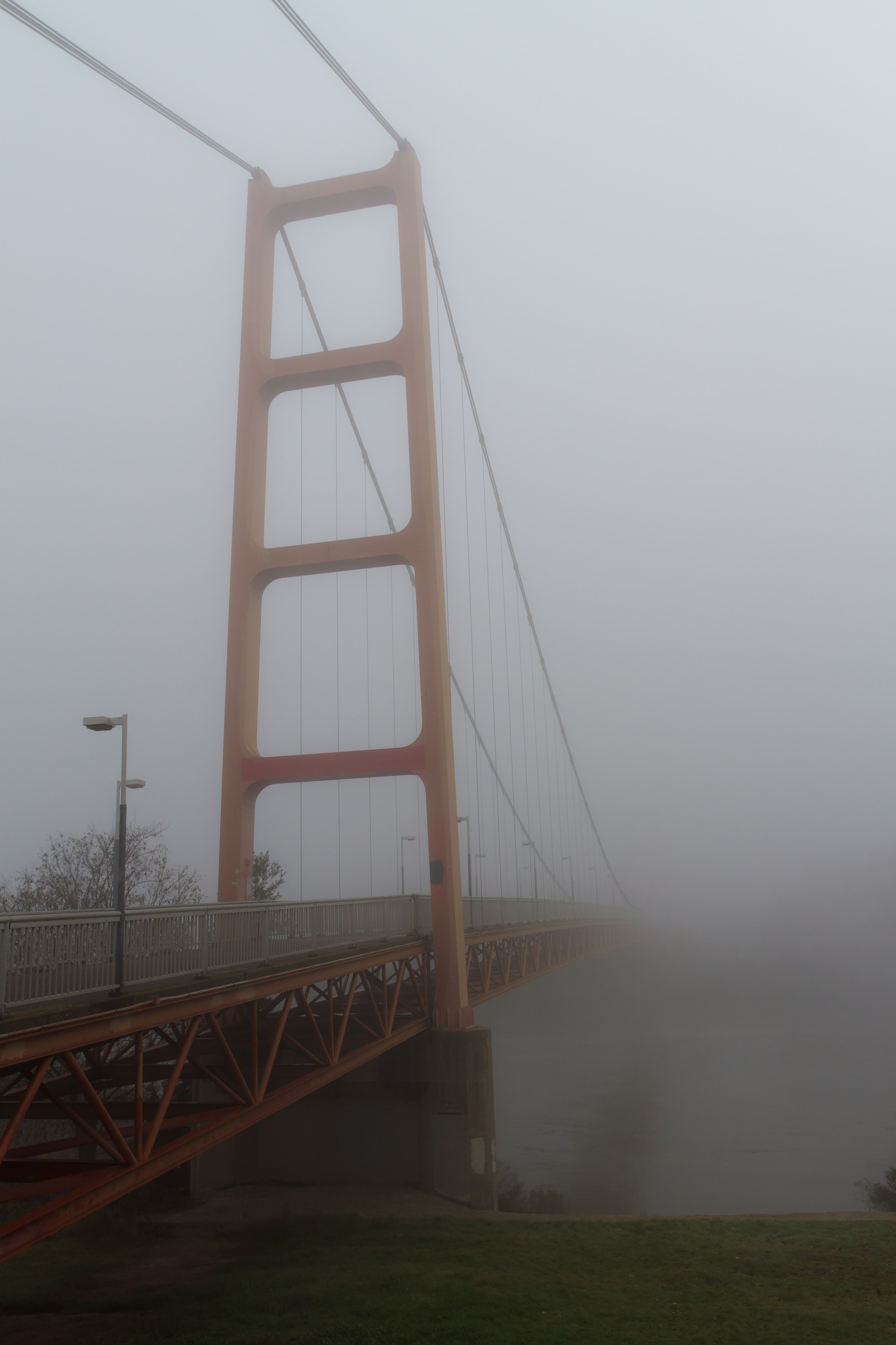
The Guy West Bridge in fog.

The bridge was closed between May and July 1987 after three suspender cables (connecting the deck to the overhead suspension cable) failed. All of the suspender cables were X-rayed during the closure, and the three suspender cables, along with three neighboring suspender cables were replaced, with some damage noted to all suspender cables. A draft root cause investigation identified the potential for fatigue and corrosion damage in the overhead suspension cables. The final root cause concluded in 1990 that the suspender cables had failed in fatigue at the top of the socket connector to the bridge deck. Since the fatigue was caused by swaying in the overhead suspension cables relative to the bridge deck, all suspender cables were potentially vulnerable to fatigue failure. The most cost-effective repair that would maintain the aesthetic appearance of the current structure was complete replacement of the suspender cables on a periodic basis (estimated at 20–25 years).

A later study, completed in 2011, found that many components of the bridge were in good condition, with the notable exception of the original lead-based paint. The coating had failed, allowing some surface corrosion in many places. The 2011 study also found several fractured wires in the southern main suspension cable, which were promptly tested to determine the root cause of failure (determined to be fatigue) and to effect immediate repairs. The bridge was closed on weekends in the summer and fall of 2014 to remove the original lead-based paint and give it a fresh coat of international orange. The repainting and other minor repairs were slated to cost in excess of US$3,000,000 (equivalent to $4,080,000 in 2025).

== In media ==
The Guy West Bridge was the subject of an episode of California's Gold in 2009.

== See also ==
- List of crossings of the Lower American River
