= American River Parkway =

Regional recreation area in California, US

Coordinates: 38.62°N 121.3°W

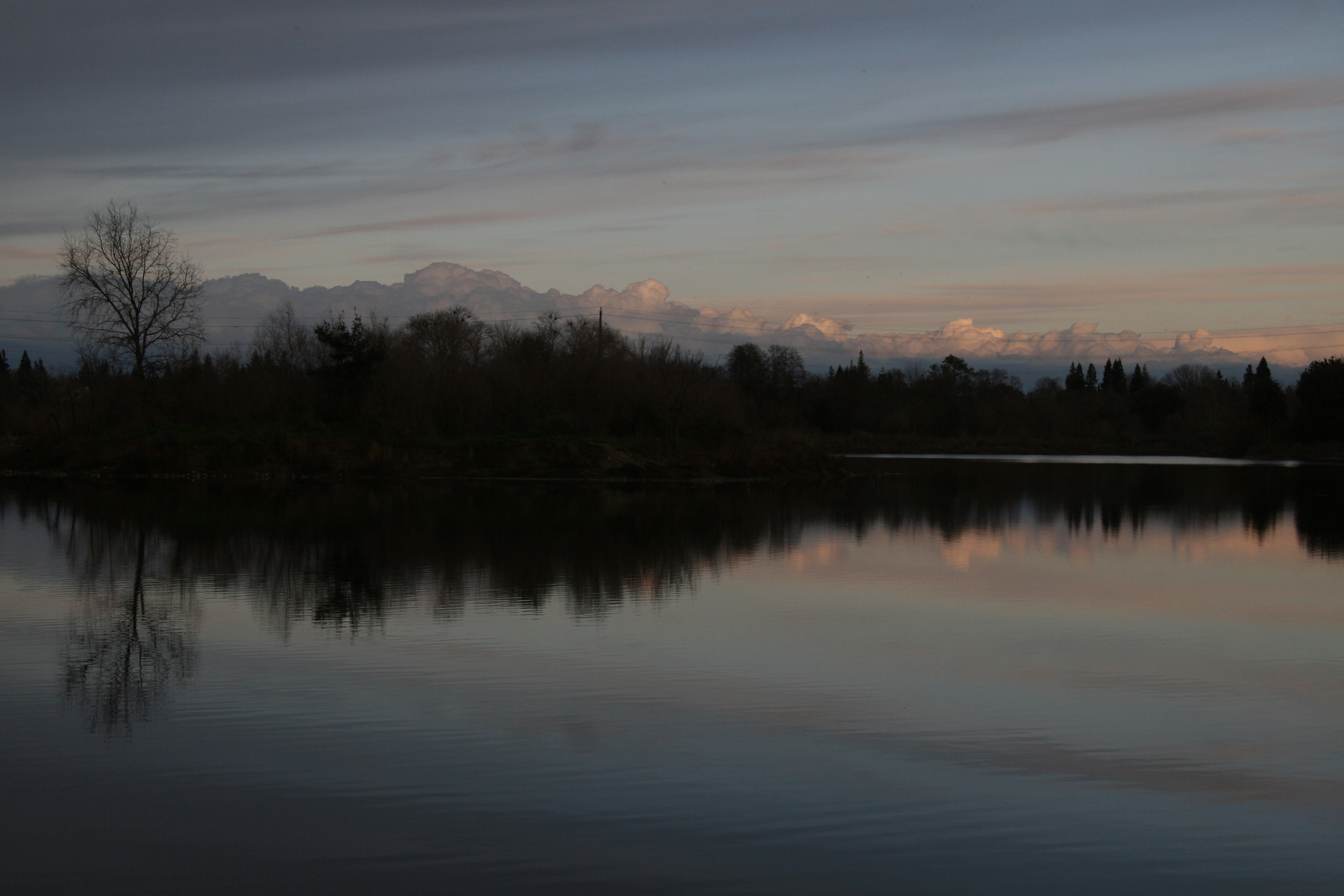
William Pond Park

The American River Parkway is a 32-mile (51 km) urban regional recreation area that runs along the American River throughout Sacramento County, California, consisting of many smaller parks and boat launching points. It can be accessed by various exits off U.S. Route 50 in Sacramento County. Levees line the river to prevent flooding of developed areas.

== Major Parks ==
=== Discovery Park ===
Discovery Park is a 302-acre (1.22 km^{2}) park located just outside Downtown Sacramento, at the confluence of the American River and the Sacramento River, accessible by taking the Garden Highway exit off Interstate 5. Discovery Park is the trailhead for the 32-mile (51 km) long Jedediah Smith Memorial Trail which continues all the way to Folsom through the historic Leidesdorff Ranch. Other activities include softball fields, an archery range, a picnic area and boat ramps. Every October, Discovery Park is home of the annual Aftershock Festival and Golden Sky festival.

=== Ancil Hoffman Park ===
Ancil Hoffman Park is a major 396-acre (1.60 km^{2}) park located in Carmichael, California, accessible by taking the Watt Avenue exit off Highway 50. Named after a Sacramento County Supervisor and manager to the famous boxer Max Baer, the park has many ancient oaks and is bordered on two sides by the American River. Major attractions include reconstructed Maidu Native American homes, the Ancil Hoffman Golf Course and the Effie Yeaw Nature Center. Many varieties of animals can be seen in Ancil Hoffman Park including wild turkey, deer, and hawks.

=== River Bend Park ===
River Bend Park is a 444-acre (1.80 km^{2}) county regional park located near where the river bends in Rancho Cordova. It is accessible by taking the Bradshaw Road exit off of Highway 50. It was formerly known as Goethe Park but due to controversy surrounding C.M. Goethe, the park was renamed in 2008. It is one of Sacramento County's oldest regional parks and was one of the three original areas along the parkway that the county acquired between 1961 and 1964. Located on the Jedediah Smith Memorial Trail, it is just across the Harold Richey Bicycle Bridge from William B. Pond Recreation Area.

=== William B. Pond Recreation Area ===
William B. Pond Recreation Area is a county regional park located at the end of Arden Way in Carmichael. It is located along the Jedediah Smith Memorial Trail and is just across the Harold Richey Bicycle Bridge from River Bend Park. The area is home to a man-made fishing pond stocked with trout and catfish and is also home to bass, bluegill and tule perch. According to the county, there are many habitats to explore, from riverside forests and fields to warm ponds and swift, chilly rapids.

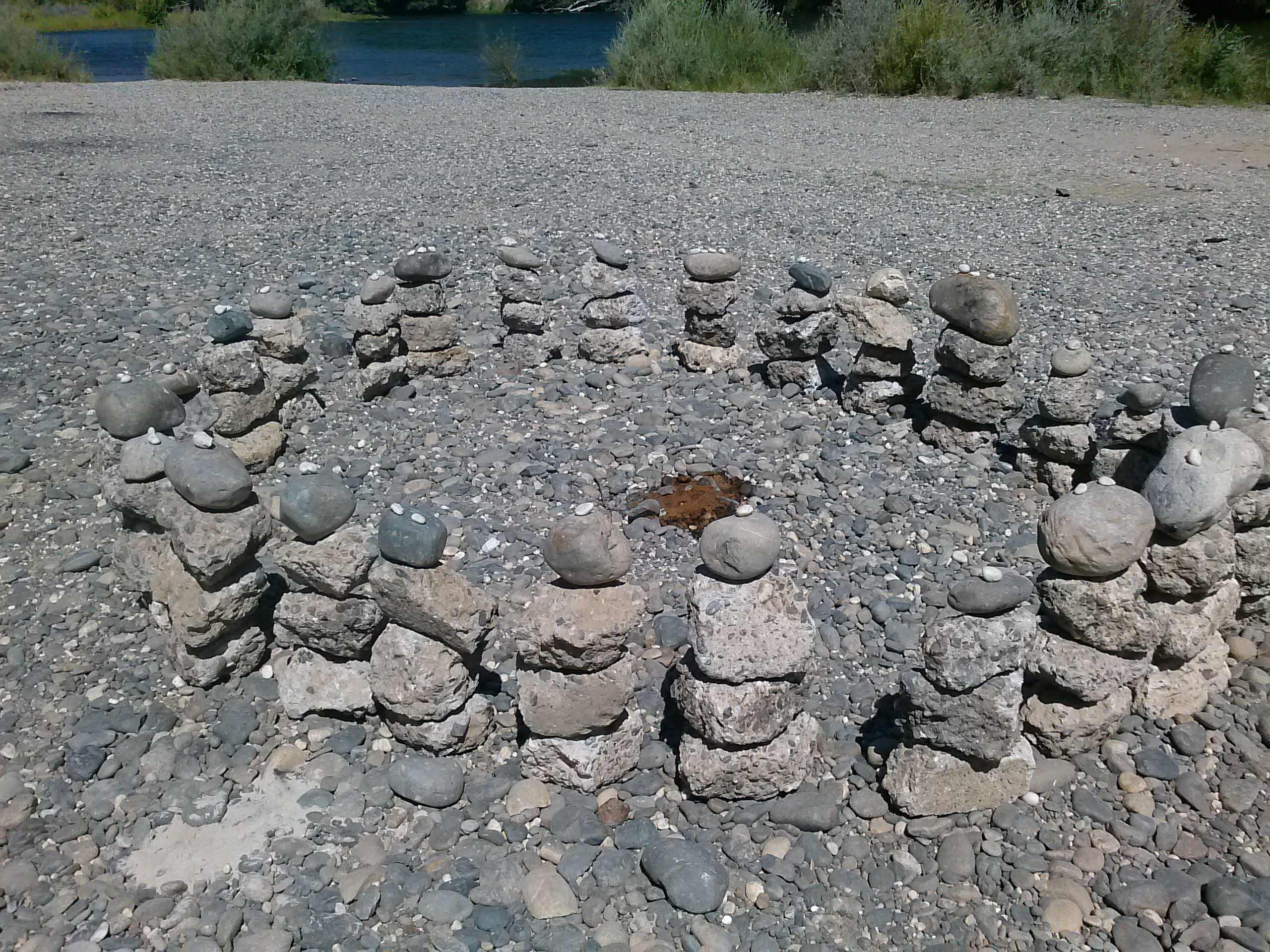
Rock art formation by the "Mysterious rock artist" located at the Watt Avenue access point in Sacramento, California.

== Access points ==
=== Watt Avenue Access Park ===
Watt Avenue Access Park (River Walk Access) is located where Watt Avenue and La Riviera Drive intersect. It is accessible by taking the Watt Avenue exit off of Highway 50, continuing on to La Riviera Drive.

This area is home to the mysterious "Rock Artist" who leaves piles of rocks in decorative formations that can sometimes be seen from the street above.

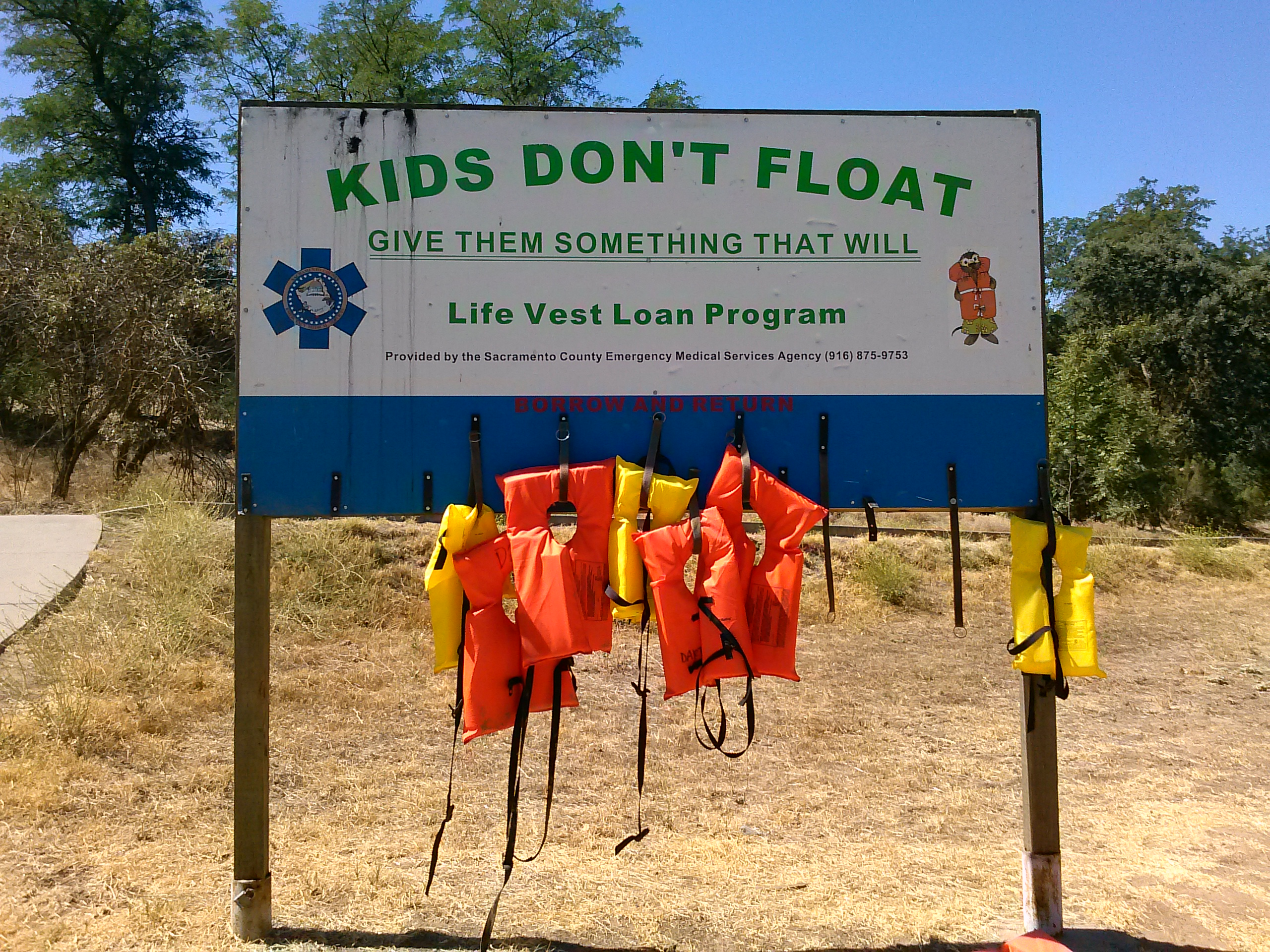
Life vests available for loan at the American River Access Park

It is a popular spot for boating, swimming, wading, and fishing. Swimmers and waders are cautioned to take care in while swimming in this area, and this park access is equipped with a life jacket "loaner" station. There are many life vests displayed, of various sizes, that can be taken for use and replaced when the park visitor is finished with it. Other amenities include a large parking area, restroom, and a water fountain.

== American River Parkway Foundation ==
The American River Parkway Foundation is a non profit that "supports the preservation and enjoyment of the American River Parkway by fostering environmental education, stewardship and volunteer opportunities." Its headquarters is located at the William B. Pond Recreation Area in Carmichael. Construction on the new headquarters which is a single story 1800 square feet building that serves as a central location for all foundation related activities finished in 2004.
