= California Forever =

U.S. company planning city of 400,000 in Solano County, California

- Type: Private
- Industry: Real estate development
- Founded: 2017
- Founder: Jan Sramek
- Subsidiaries: Flannery Associates
- Website: californiaforever.com

California Forever is an American real estate development corporation founded by Jan Sramek. Through its subsidiary Flannery Associates, California Forever anonymously purchased over 50,000 acres (20,000 ha) of farm land in southeastern Solano County, on the edge of the San Francisco Bay Area. In August 2023, Flannery Associates LLC began a campaign under the subsidiary of California Forever to develop a new walkable city of up to 400,000 people on 17,500 acres (7,100 ha) of land between Rio Vista and Suisun City. In September 2023, the group collected enough signatures for a ballot initiative to change the county's orderly growth initiative and legalize the construction of the planned city. The group submitted a ballot proposal under the name "East Solano Plan" in February 2024.

On July 22, 2024, after several polls across the county, the company withdrew its ballot initiative (after spending nearly $9 million on the ad campaign) and announced an agreement with county officials to create an environmental impact report and development agreement. It has been proposed to reintroduce the ballot initiative in 2026 after environmental reports have been published.

The project has faced criticism questioning the land acquisition tactics of Flannery Associates, the security behind the proposed water supply, and the environmental impacts of the project on surrounding land.

== History ==
Czech-born entrepreneur Jan Sramek founded California Forever and its subsidiary Flannery Associates in 2017. 97% of the company's funding comes from US investors, with the remaining 3% coming from British and Irish investors.

The development of the project was described as a five-year "stealth campaign" by The Real Deal. During that time, the company purchased over 50,000 acres (20,000 ha) of land in Solano County, California for an estimated $900 million. Although the company claimed that the project was kept secret to prevent speculation from driving up real estate prices, the strategy drew widespread criticism for a lack of transparency. Flannery Associates, the company behind California Forever, filed a $510 million lawsuit in 2023 against a group of local landowners, accusing them of colluding to inflate land prices. Some farmers who refused to sell their land described feeling “caught off guard” by the aggressive nature of the land purchases and were pressured by repeated offers. Reports from KQED noted that several farmers had reached confidential settlements to avoid costly legal battles.

In August 2023, the company issued a mail-in poll to gauge support for the project among local residents. As of September 2023, the land is zoned for agricultural use only and is subject to slow-growth laws. Due to these legal protections, the land can only be developed for urban use if a ballot initiative is passed by local voters. In January 2024 the company released its proposed city plans and the ballot initiative coming to voters, however the ballot measure was withdrawn in July 2024.

In January 2025, the city of Suisun City announced that it was investigating expanding to lands to the east, effectively annexing much of California Forever. Such a maneuver would side-step the need for a county-wide referendum on the issue. In March 2025, the city of Rio Vista also started exploring an annexation of California Forever land.

In March 2025, the company proposed the development of a shipbuilding facility on 1,400 acres (570 ha) near Collinsville. The company says that the shipyard project would complement their city-building ambitions, emphasizing the region's maritime heritage and economic revitalization potential. The proposal garnered support from the Bay Area Council, and local elected officials. A working group was created aimed at fostering shipbuilding and maritime opportunities in Solano County.

=== Indigenous history ===
Patwin people are part of the Wintun linguistic family, native to California's Central Valley. Archaeological evidence has dated continuous Indigenous occupation back to at least 2000 BCE. These communities relied on the region's marshes, grasslands, and oak woodlands for fishing, hunting, and acorn gathering. This helped them form a complex social and trade network spanning throughout Northern California, including present-day Solano County. These areas include Patwin villages near the Suisun Marsh and Putah Creek, which are very close to the land parcels owned by the project's developers. The Patwin and other tribes maintain cultural ties to this region despite the significant displacement they faced following Spanish and Mexican colonization in the 19th century.

California Forever has drawn criticism from Indigenous leaders for not consulting local tribes during its land acquisition process. During a public meeting in Vallejo, Marge Grow-Eppard, a member of the Miwok tribe, accused the developers of disregarding the heritage of the Native Americans and warned that construction would cement over Native American burial grounds without consent. The company responded by stating that it only recently started reaching out to regional groups and their environmental reviews would address these concerns. This incident highlighted broader tensions between the project's backers and the Indigenous communities who see the development of this project as a continuation of historical patterns of land dispossession.

== Investors ==
On August 25, 2023, The New York Times reported that the company's backers include the venture capital firm Andreessen Horowitz, as well as several prominent Silicon Valley investors:

- Michael Moritz, former partner at Sequoia Capital.
- Laurene Powell Jobs, founder and chair of Emerson Collective; widow of Apple co-founder Steve Jobs.
- Reid Hoffman, co-founder of LinkedIn.
- Marc Andreessen, co-founder of Andreesen Horowitz.
- Chris Dixon, general partner at Andreesen Horowitz.
- Patrick Collison, co-founder and CEO of Stripe.
- John Collison, co-founder and President of Stripe.
- Nat Friedman, former GitHub CEO and investor.
- Daniel Gross, partner at Y Combinator.

California Forever has stated that its investors are not involved in everyday operations.

== Planned development ==
The site is located in Solano County, California, approximately 60 miles (97 km) northeast of San Francisco. Its planned size would include a population of up to 400,000 residents over a land area about two thirds the size of San Francisco, just north of Highway 12 between Travis Air Force Base and the City of Rio Vista. The proposed city would include residential homes, a solar farm and public parks. The original architectural designs for the city, released on the company's website, showed Mediterranean architecture and streetcar infrastructure. However, some observers have questioned the design of the project, with The Real Deal noting that “the way tech luminaries have gone about this city’s roll-out has not been visionary” but “mystifyingly backward.”

California YIMBY, a pro-development organization funded by silicon-valley tech, showed support for the project with a statement in June 2024, describing the project as being designed by “some of the brightest minds in California planning” and potentially offering “a more sustainable pattern of urban growth.” However, critics argue that the project could further environmental issues and economic inequities by prioritizing development outside of existing cities, contributing to urban sprawl.

=== Public response ===
The Greenbelt Alliance, Sierra Club, and other groups have formed a coalition called Solano Together to oppose California Forever's project. The project has faced opposition from "vast and varied" groups including farmers, climate advocates and the Solano County Republican Party. Local organizations such as the Solano Land Trust and the mentioned coalition Solano Together have publicly opposed the project. They state that farmland, biodiversity, and water quality are threatened by the development of California Forever. Additionally, these groups have accused the developers of misleading marketing while failing to address potential long-term environmental impacts. Members of the local community are also worried that the project would primarily benefit the wealthy investors at their expense. 70% of Solano County voters believe that most kids in Solano County will not be able to afford to live in their current neighborhood when they grow up, with 15% unsure. The results reflect widespread uncertainty from the residents of Solano County regarding concerns about Affordable housing in the region.

Additionally, the members of Solano County are displeased with the land acquisition tactics of the project. For example, rancher Chris Scheuring said, “I think they thought we’d just fold like a cheap suit,” when referring to the lawsuits filed against the landowners who refused to sell, calling the company's strategies an intimidation campaign against local farmers. U.S. Representative John Garamendi also stated how “The community is very angry — by the secrecy, by the duplicity, by the attack on family farmers,” and “The atmosphere is very, very negative.” These reactions reflect broader fears that the project would primarily benefit the wealthy investors while putting the livelihoods of residents and farm workers at risk.

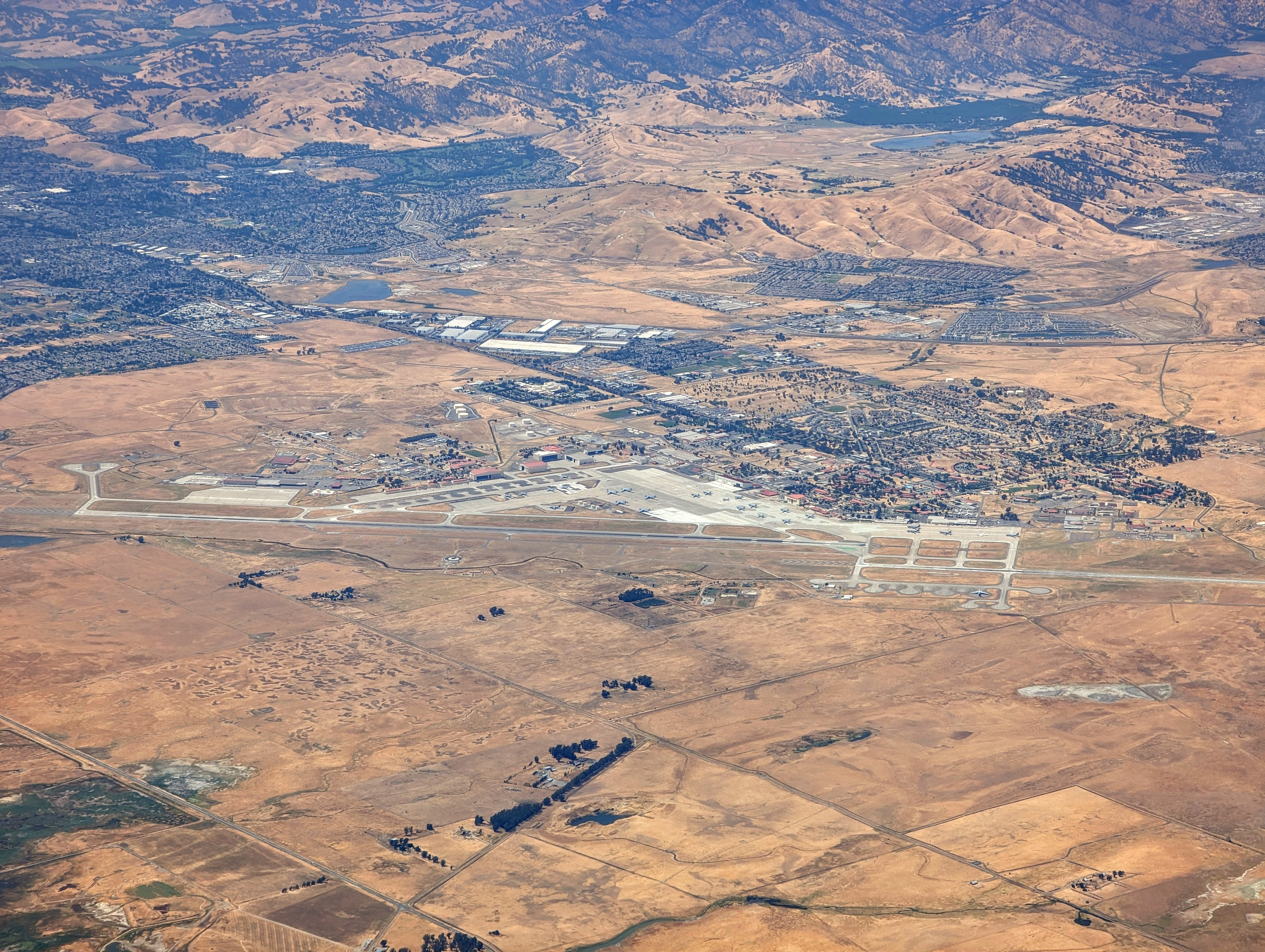
Travis Air Force Base and surrounding farmland in 2023. California Forever's acquisition of land adjacent to the air base prompted concerns over national security.

California Forever's secretive acquisition of land adjacent to Travis Air Force Base through its subsidiary Flannery Associates raised concerns over the security of the military installation. In July 2023, The Wall Street Journal reported that the United States Air Force's Foreign Investment Risk Review Office had been investigating Flannery Associates' land purchases for about eight months. Additionally, US Representatives John Garamendi and Mike Thompson, who both represent parts of Solano County, asked the FBI and the Committee on Foreign Investment in the United States to investigate Flannery Associates' land acquisitions.

The project has received widespread criticism from local residents and officials. The urban design critic for The San Francisco Chronicle criticized the designs as lacking detail and being unrealistic, and Jon Steinberg compared them to the futuristic city of The Jetsons.

=== Environmental and water concerns ===
California Forever released a water plan in 2024 that outlines a strategy using recycled, surface, and imported water sources. Company representatives have described their proposed plan as “sustainable” and “drought resilient.” However, water policy experts are worried that the plan could strain existing systems and divert water from local communities and agricultural sources. Critics also wondered if the long-term demand of the development will be compatible with the infrastructure capacity and the water availability of California.

Critics of the planned development have noted the lack of a reliable water supply and presence of wind farms as a potential obstacle to urban development. Catherine Moy, the mayor of Fairfield, California, stated that the lack of mass transit, inadequate highway access, and drought conditions in the area would make it difficult to support a city. Its potential impact on neighboring communities in the Sacramento–San Joaquin River Delta has also been cited as a potential drawback. Environmental groups and experts have also raised concerns about the ecological impact of the proposed city. The Center for Biological Diversity claims that more than 100 rare and protected species, including the California tiger salamander and western pond turtle, would suffer from habitat destruction.

Additionally, water policy researchers at KQED question the “sustainable, drought-resilient” strategy that the California Forever project proposes. Their experts warn that the long-term demand of the project may strain existing water systems within Solano County, especially during drought conditions. Environmental advocates and local residents have described this project as an issue of environmental justice. Concerns about pollution, water scarcity, and loss of farmland all disproportionately affect rural and lower-income communities.

=== Displacement and land use impacts ===
Flannery Associates has acquired over 60,000 acres (24,000 ha) of farmland in eastern Solano County, drawing criticism for its potential to displace existing agricultural workers and family farms in the region. Some ranchers have described the land purchases as “so arrogant it’s amazing” and have said that cancelling long-standing grazing and foraging leases has made it harder to keep their operations viable. Local organizations such as Solano Together have expressed concerns about the local farm workers arguing that converting large areas of farmland into new housing and commercial districts could displace farm workers, increase land costs, and weaken the agricultural system that local communities rely on. Former West Sacramento mayor Christopher Cabaldon has warned that operating family farms may become significantly more difficult due to the development of California Forever. He also accused Flannery Associates of canceling long-standing foraging leases. Environmental justice advocates have also framed California Forever as part of a broader pattern where tech-backed real estate projects reshape rural land use and grant control of land to wealthy investors, promoting land dispossession, rural gentrification, and the degradation of long-standing agricultural communities.
