= USS Pembina (AK-200) =

Cargo ship of the United States Navy

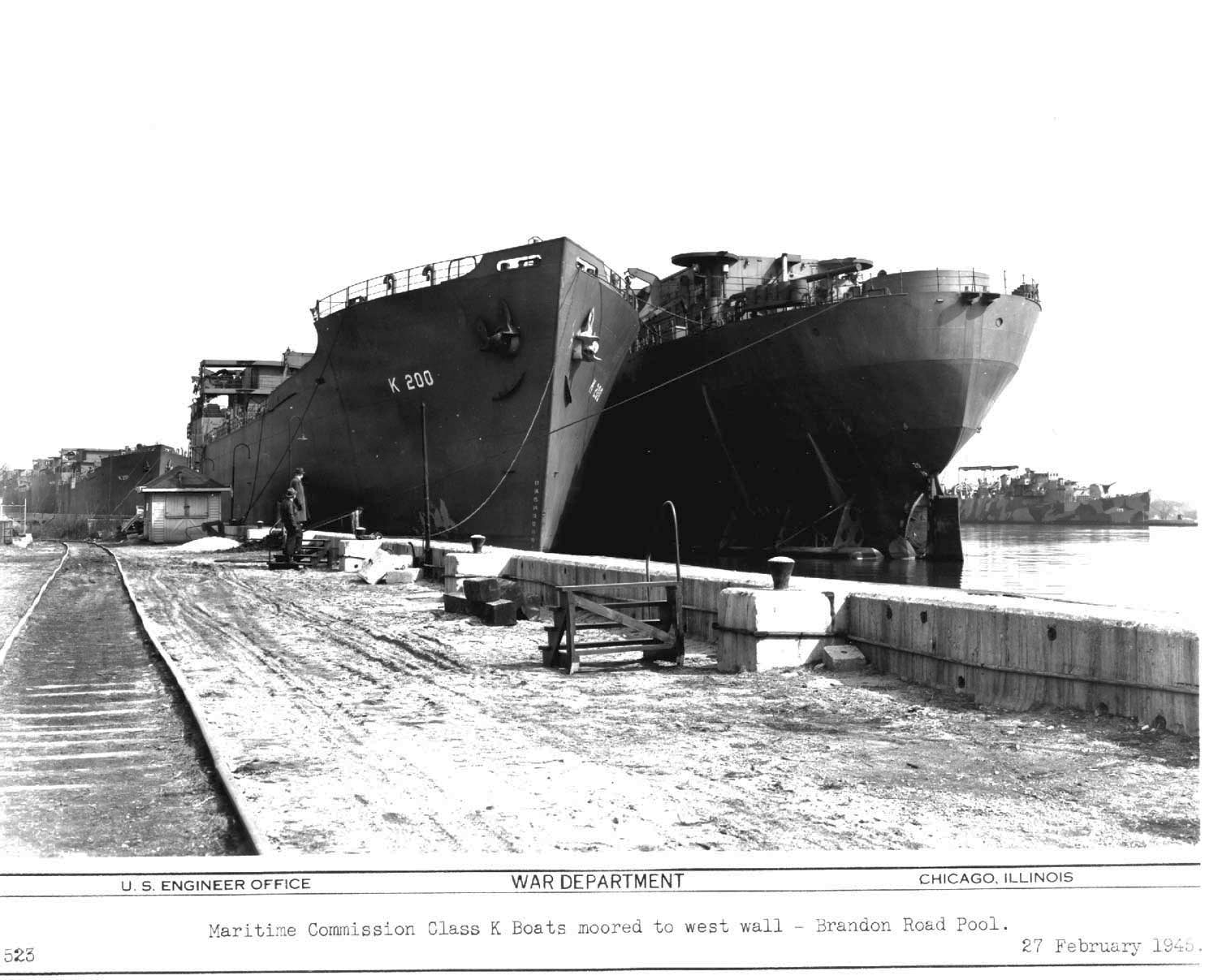
- USS Pembina (AK-200) and other AKs moored at the west wall, Brandon Pool, Chicago, Illinois, 27 February 1945, waiting transit to New Orleans for fitting out and commissioning.

History

United States
- Name: Pembina
- Namesake: Pembina County, North Dakota
- Ordered: as type (C1-M-AV1) hull, MC hull 2154
- Builder: Globe Shipbuilding Co., Superior, Wisconsin
- Yard number: 121
- Laid down: 23 June 1944
- Launched: 14 October 1944
- Sponsored by: Miss Elizabeth Mann
- Acquired: 9 May 1945
- Commissioned: 25 May 1945
- Decommissioned: 26 January 1946
- Stricken: 5 June 1946
- Identification: Hull symbol: AK-200; Code letters: NEOS
- Fate: Acquired by the US War Department 26 January 1946

United States
- Name: Pembina
- Operator: Shipping Control Authority for the Japanese Merchant Marine (SCAJAP)
- Acquired: 26 January 1946
- In service: 26 January 1946
- Out of service: 1 July 1950
- Fate: Returned to the US Maritime Commission (MARCOM), 1 July 1950

United States
- Name: Pembina
- Operator: Military Sea Transportation Service (MSTS)
- In service: 1 April 1951
- Stricken: 31 March 1958
- Identification: Hull symbol: T-AK-200
- Fate: Transferred to the US Army, 29 May 1968

United States
- Name: Resolute
- Operator: US Army
- Acquired: 29 May 1968
- Commissioned: 19 June 1968
- Decommissioned: 25 January 1979
- Renamed: 19 June 1968, Resolute
- Fate: Returned to US Maritime Administration (MARAD), 25 January 1979; Sold to Coast Line Associates, LP, 10 October 1980

United States
- Name: Pembina (1980–1989); Kathleen Pearcy (1989–1992); Pembina (1992–1996)
- In service: 10 October 1980
- Out of service: 1996
- Fate: Sold to Friend Ships, 1996

United States
- Name: Spirit of Grace
- Owner: Friend Ships
- In service: 1996
- Identification: IMO number: 8037815
- Fate: Scrapped 2008

General characteristics
- Class & type: Alamosa-class cargo ship
- Type: C1-M-AV1
- Tonnage: 5,032 long tons deadweight (DWT)
- Displacement: 2,382 long tons (2,420 t) (standard); 7,450 long tons (7,570 t) (full load)
- Length: 388 ft 8 in (118.47 m)
- Beam: 50 ft (15 m)
- Draft: 21 ft 1 in (6.43 m)
- Installed power: 1 × Nordberg, TSM 6 diesel engine; 1,750 shp (1,300 kW)
- Propulsion: 1 × propeller
- Speed: 11.5 kn (21.3 km/h; 13.2 mph)
- Capacity: 3,945 t (3,883 long tons) DWT; 9,830 cu ft (278 m^{3}) (refrigerated); 227,730 cu ft (6,449 m^{3}) (non-refrigerated)
- Complement: 15 Officers; 70 Enlisted
- Armament: 1 × 3 in (76 mm)/50 caliber dual purpose gun (DP); 6 × 20 mm (0.8 in) Oerlikon anti-aircraft (AA) cannons

USS Pembina (AK-200) – later known as USNS Pembina (T-AK-200) -- was an Alamosa-class cargo ship that was constructed for the U.S. Navy during the closing period of World War II. She supported the end-of-war Navy effort and was subsequently placed in service with the US Army under the Shipping Control Authority for the Japanese Merchant Marine with a Japanese crew in Yokosuka, Japan.

In 1951, she was returned to the Navy and served the remainder of her Navy career with the Military Sea Transportation Service. In 1968 she was again transferred to the Army as USAT Resolute and served with the Army until she was returned to the U.S. Maritime Administration and sold in 1980.

== Construction ==
The second ship to be so named by the Navy, Pembina (AK–200) was laid down 23 June 1944, MC Hull 2154, by the Globe SB Co., Superior, Wisconsin, launched 14 October 1944; sponsored by Miss Elizabeth Mann; acquired by the Navy through the Maritime Commission 9 May 1945; and commissioned 25 May 1945.

== World War II-related service ==
After shakedown in the Gulf of Mexico, Pembina loaded cargo at Gulfport, Mississippi, for delivery to Subic Bay, Luzon in the Philippine Islands. She sailed 21 June, arriving 10 August, and proceeded with other cargoes to Okinawa; Jinsen, Korea; and Japanese ports. After off-loading at Yokosuka, Japan 31 December, she was ordered to report to Commander Fleet Activities Yokosuka to decommission.

=== Temporary service with the War Department ===
Pembina decommissioned 26 January 1946, and was delivered to War Shipping Administration (WSA) representatives for turn over to the US War Department under loan agreement (bare boat basis). She was struck from the Naval Vessel Register 5 June.

Pembina operated under Shipping Control Authority for the Japanese Merchant Marine (SCAJAP), with a Japanese crew and licensed American officers. Title was transferred to the Navy on 1 July 1950. The ship had been reinstated on the Naval Vessel Register 28 June 1950. She transferred from SCAJAP via the US Army to the Navy Military Sea Transportation Service (MSTS) 1 April 1951 at Yokohama, Japan.

=== Assigned to the MSTS ===
She was assigned to the Commander MSTS Pacific Area at San Francisco, California, 17 April 1956 following service in the Western Pacific Ocean, based in Japan.

=== Inactivation ===
Pembina was placed in temporary custody of US Maritime Administration (MARAD) 18 April 1957, and assigned to the Olympia, Washington, Reserve Fleet in ready status. She was given permanent assignment to MarAd 31 March 1958, berthed at Olympia, and struck from the Naval Vessel Register the same day.

=== Transferred to the U.S. Army ===
She remained at Olympia in the National Defense Reserve Fleet until transferred to the Army 29 May 1968. Renamed USAT Resolute 19 June 1968, the cargo ship served the US Army as a transportation and training ship. In 1971 she was moved to the Rio Vista Marine Storage Activity Site in Rio Vista, California and used to train personnel in cargo handling. However, when the Army changed over to containerized cargo handling she was no longer useful for cargo or training purposes. She was returned to the US Maritime Commission's Suisun Bay Reserve Fleet on 25 January 1979. Resolute was sold by MARAD on 10 October 1980, to Coast Line Associates, L.P.

== Merchant service ==
Resolute was renamed Kathleen Pearcy 26 October 1989, when she was sold to the Seaborne Line, Inc., her name changed again 6 August 1992, back to Pembina. In 1996 she was sold to a US-based Missionary Group called "Friendships". Renamed Spirit of Grace, the former Pembina hauled supplies and delivered aid to needy people in various part of the world. On a mission trip to Israel in 2006, Spirit of Grace burned out a cylinder in her main engine, requiring an expensive rebuild. At the same time, Friendships was offered a newer vessel of similar size, which was accepted and has been renamed Integrity. As a result, Spirit of Grace was returned to the original donor and subsequently sold to ESCO Marine in Brownsville Tx, where she was scrapped in December 2008.

== Honors and awards ==
Qualified Pembina personnel were eligible for the following:

- American Campaign Medal
- Asiatic-Pacific Campaign Medal
- World War II Victory Medal
- Navy Occupation Service Medal (with Asia clasp)

== Notes ==
Citations

== Bibliography ==
Online resources

- "Pembina (AK-200)". Dictionary of American Naval Fighting Ships. Naval History and Heritage Command. 19 August 2015. This article incorporates text from this source, which is in the public domain.
- "C1 Cargo Ships". www.ShipbuildingHistory.com. 28 August 2009.
- "Pembina (AK-200)". NavSource. 18 April 2014.
- "Pembina (AK-200)". United States Department of Transportation.
- Pezzaglia, Phil (27 April 2011). "Exploring Rio Vista's Past: Local Military Installations, Part II". River News Herald. Archived from the original on 8 August 2014.
- "Annual Report". Archived from the original on 3 March 2016.
- "Past projects". Archived from the original on 28 November 2016.
