= Rio Vista Airport =

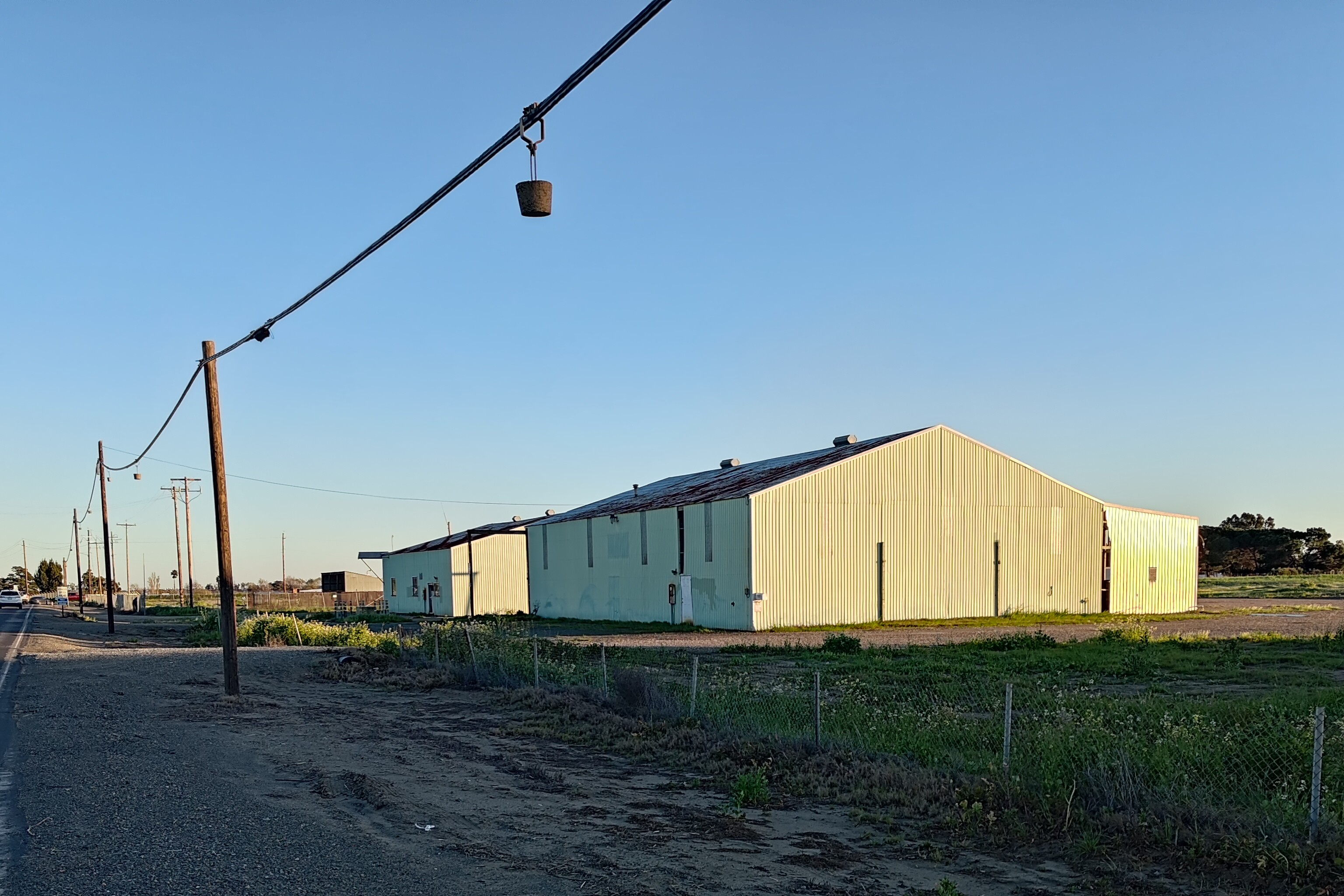
- Old hangars at the (now dismantled) Rio Vista airport were repurposed into commercial/industrial properties following its closure.
- IATA: none; ICAO: none

Summary
- Airport type: Public
- Operator: City of Rio Vista
- Location: Rio Vista, California
- Elevation AMSL: 43 ft / 13 m
- Coordinates: 38°10′15.96″N 121°41′17.17″W
- Interactive map of Rio Vista Airport

Runways
| Direction | Length | | Surface |
| Direction | ft | m | Surface |
|---|---|---|---|
| 7/25 | 3,200 | 975 | Asphalt |
| 14/32 | 1,960 | 597 | Asphalt |

Rio Vista Airport was a public airport located northeast of Rio Vista, serving Solano County, California, USA. This general aviation airport had two runways.

The airport was closed in 1995 due to flooding and beginning in 1993 operations were moved to the new airport, the Rio Vista Municipal Airport.

== "Flying Down to Rio" Restaurant ==
In March 1982 a man named Bob Reichert opened a restaurant on the airfield named Flying Down to Rio (after a film of the same name). A Douglas DC-4 (tail number "D54DO", a converted Skymaster C-54) was purchased from a Brazilian Airline and taken to Rio Vista by barge from Oakland. The bar and bistro changed ownership several times and closed sometime after March of 1985. In September of 1986, the DC-4 air frame was dismantled, sent down the Sacramento River to Collinsville and then via Nurse Slough to the Travis AFB Museum.

== Gallery ==

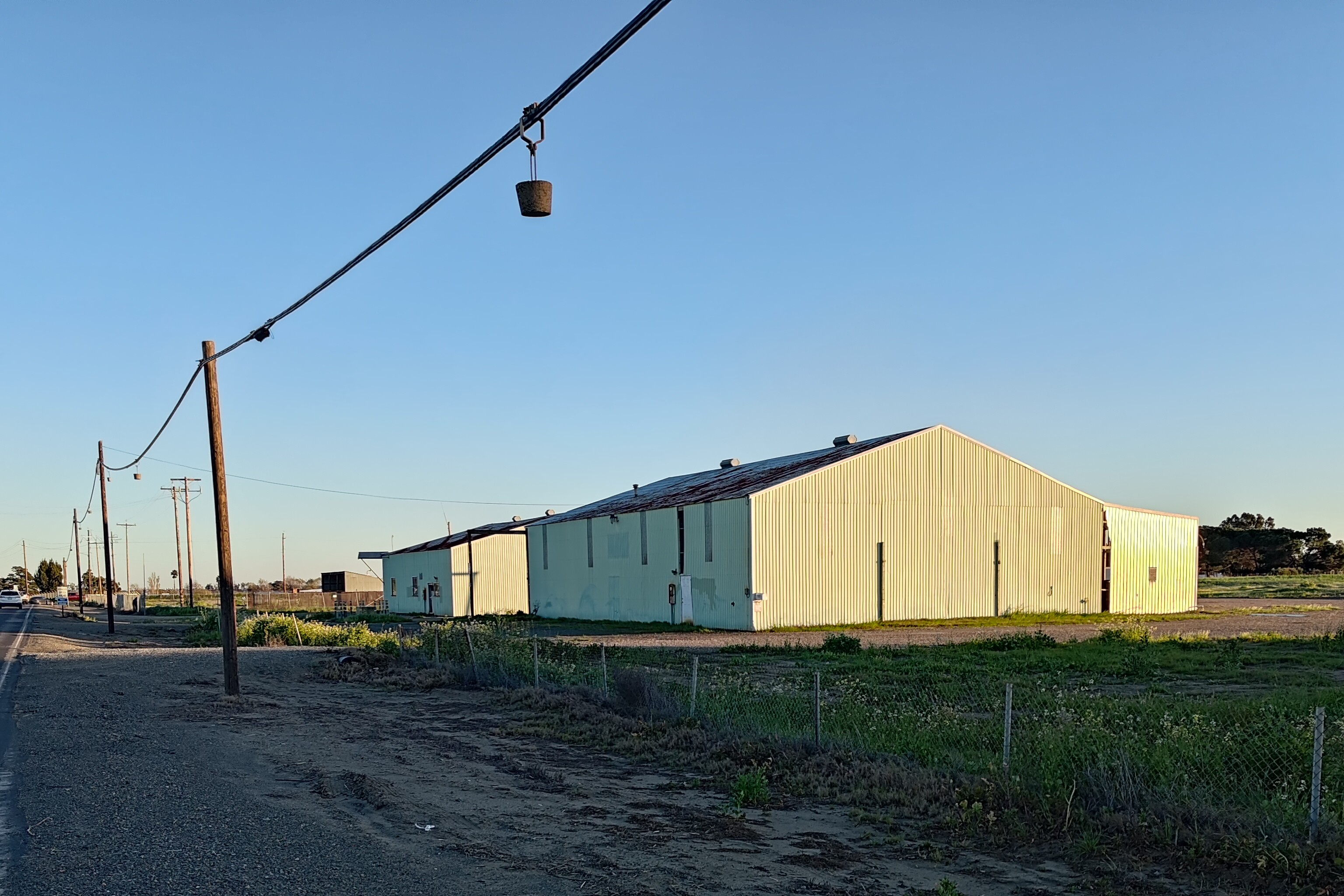

== See also ==
- List of airports in California
- List of airports in the San Francisco Bay Area
