= KRVH =

- Rio Vista, California; United States
- Broadcast area: Sacramento River Delta
- Frequency: 91.5 MHz
- Branding: Radio Rio

Programming
- Format: Classic rock Sports Radio; Community Radio

Ownership
- Owner: River Delta Unified School District; (River Delta Unified School District)

History
- First air date: 1971
- Call sign meaning: Initials of Rio Vista High

Technical information
- Licensing authority: FCC
- Facility ID: 56557
- Class: D
- Power: 50 watts
- HAAT: 31 meters (102 ft)
- Transmitter coordinates: 38°9′17″N 121°41′48″W

Links
- Public license information: Public file; LMS
- Website: club.krvh.org

KRVH is a non-commercial educational, Classic rock and Sports Radio formatted FM broadcasting radio station licensed to the River Delta Unified School District in Rio Vista, California, serving the Sacramento River Delta region of Northern California.
