= Rio Vista Municipal Airport =

- IATA: none; ICAO: none; FAA LID: O88

Summary
- Airport type: Public
- Operator: City of Rio Vista
- Location: Rio Vista, California
- Elevation AMSL: 20 ft / 6.1 m
- Coordinates: 38°11′36″N 121°42′13″W
- Interactive map of Rio Vista Municipal Airport

Runways
Direction	Length		Surface
Direction	ft	m	Surface
7/25	4,200	1,280	Asphalt
15/33	2,200	671	Asphalt

Helipads
Number	Length		Surface
Number	ft	m	Surface
H1	180	55	Concrete

Rio Vista Municipal Airport (FAA LID: O88) is a public airport located three miles (4.8 km) northwest of Rio Vista, serving Solano County, California, USA. This general aviation airport covers 273 acres (110 ha) and has two runways and one helipad. The airport is the current base of operations for the Travis AFB Aero Club. It opened in 1993, replacing the original Rio Vista Airport.

== See also ==
- List of airports in California
- List of airports in the San Francisco Bay Area
