= Rio Vista Bridge =

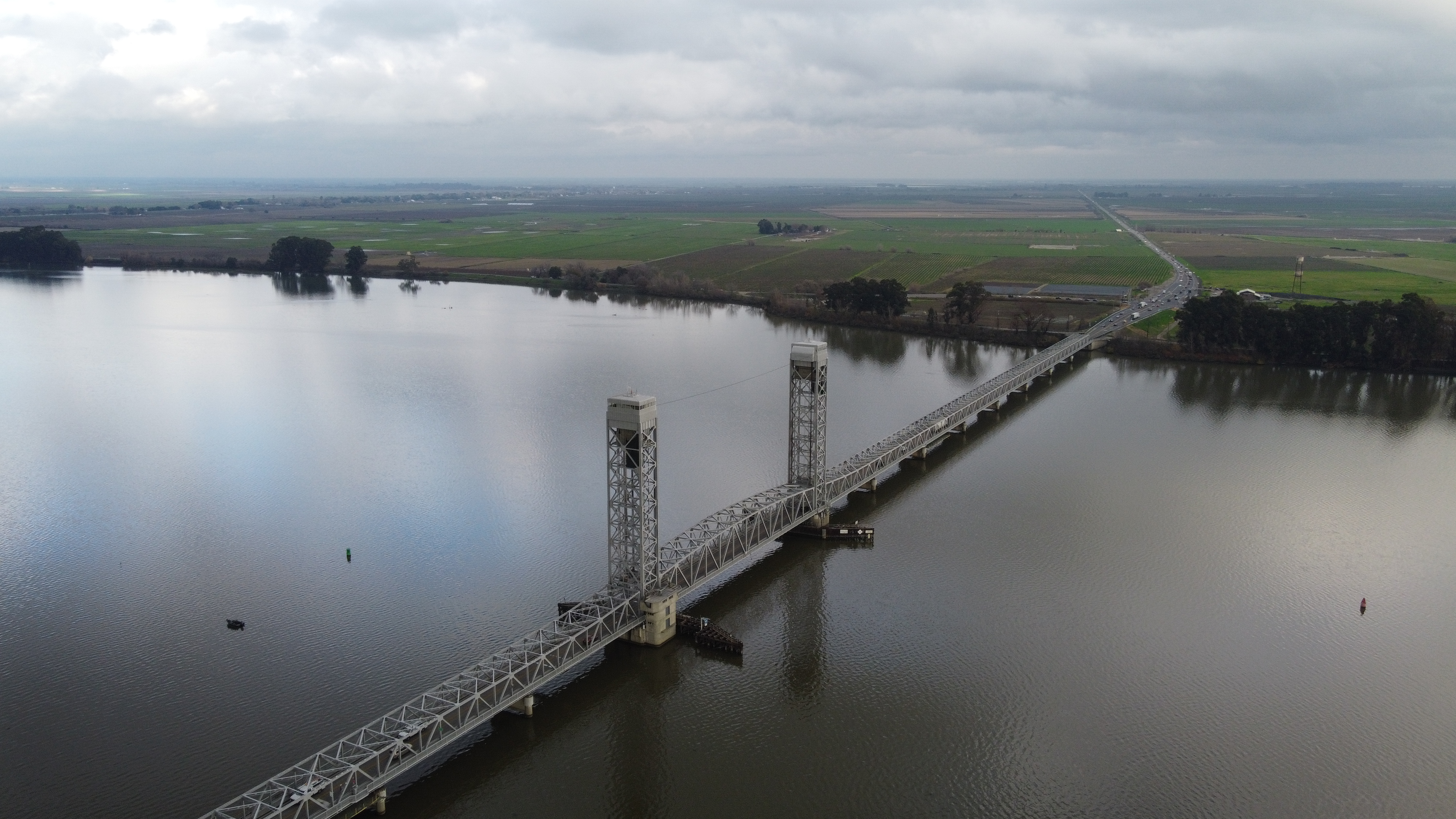
- The Helen Madere Memorial Bridge crosses the Sacramento River at Rio Vista, California.
- Coordinates: 38.158713°N 121.683819°W
- Carries: 2 lanes of SR 12
- Crosses: Sacramento River
- Locale: Rio Vista, California, U.S.
- Official name: Helen Madere Memorial Bridge
- Named for: Helen Madere
- Owner: Caltrans
- NBI: 23 0024

Characteristics
- Design: Vertical-lift through-truss (Warren truss with verticals)
- Total length: 2,890 feet (881 m), including 441-foot (134 m) concrete slab approach spans
- Width: 26-foot (8 m) roadway with 4-foot (1 m) wide sidewalks on both sides
- Longest span: 306-foot (93 m) lift span
- No. of spans: 13
- Piers in water: 12
- Clearance above: minimum 15 feet (4.6 m) through truss
- Clearance below: 135 feet (41 m) (drawbridge raised)

History
- Constructed by: Lord and Bishop (substructure)
- Fabrication by: Judson Pacific Murphy (superstructure)
- Construction start: 2 April 1957 (substructure); 24 April 1958 (superstructure)
- Construction end: 30 October 1958 (substructure)
- Construction cost: US$4,100,000 (equivalent to $43,580,000 in 2024)
- Opened: 12 January 1946 (eastern steel truss); 1 April 1960 (western vertical-lift truss portion)
- Replaces: 1919 composite bascule bridge

Statistics
- Daily traffic: 10,000 – 21,000 cars (2013)

Location
- Interactive map of Rio Vista Bridge

The Rio Vista Bridge (officially the Helen Madere Memorial Bridge) is a continuous truss span with a vertical-lift bridge in the middle which carries California State Route 12 across the Sacramento River at Rio Vista, California. The present bridge was completed in 1960 and is one of several moveable bridges spanning rivers in the Sacramento–San Joaquin River Delta. It is named after Helen Madere, who served as vice-mayor of Rio Vista. As of 2013 the bridge carries approximately 21,000 cars per day.

== 1919 bascule bridge ==
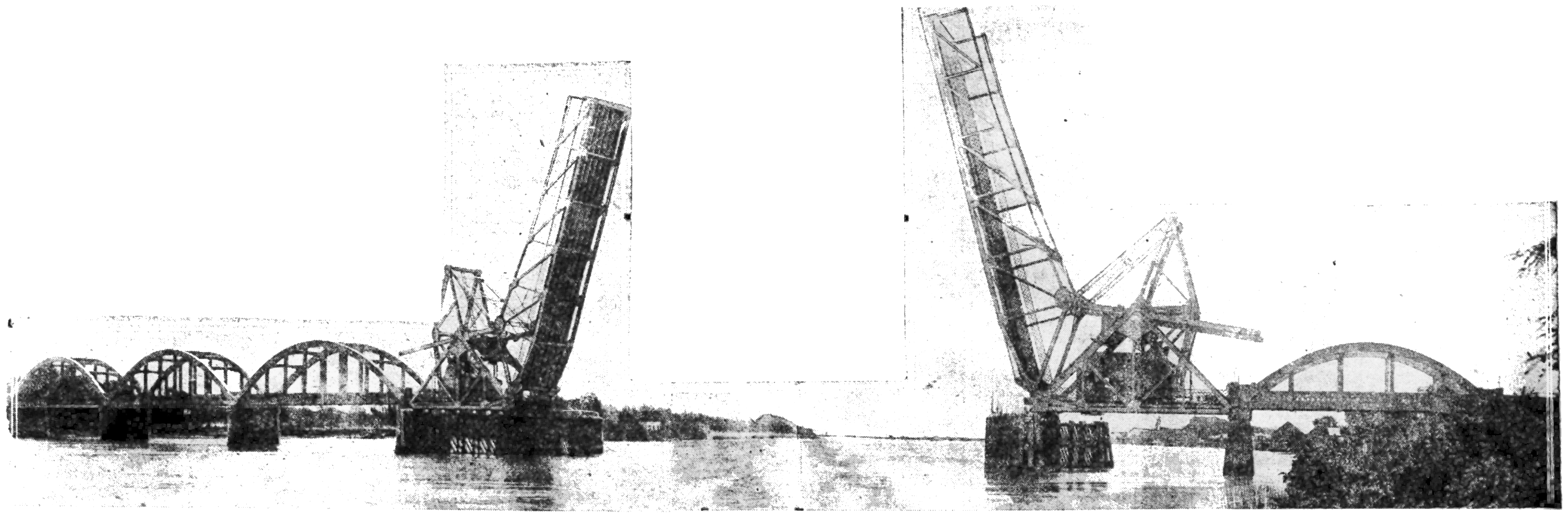
1919 photograph published in the Sacramento Union

The original bridge spanning the Sacramento River was built in 1918 and opened in January 1919 at a cost of US$260,000 (equivalent to $4,720,000 in 2024). From west to east, the 1919 bridge consisted of a 70-foot (21 m) concrete tied arch, the 343-foot (105 m) Strauss double-leaf bascule, three 120-foot (37 m) concrete tied arches and 1,670-foot (510 m) timber A-frame trestle spans.

== 1960 tower bridge ==
The 1919 bridge was replaced during seventeen years of piecewise construction. The finished 1943–1960 bridge consists of thirteen steel Warren truss spans (with one of those being the 306-foot (93 m) vertical-lift chorded Warren truss main span) carried on twelve piers. Total bridge length is 2,890 feet (880 m), including 441 feet (134 m) of concrete slab approach spans on the west end of the bridge. Upon completion, the Rio Vista bridge won an American Institute of Steel Construction class IV (movable bridges) prize bridge award in 1960.

The main lift span weighs 750 short tons (680 t), with an equal amount in counterweights, so the lift mechanism operates 1,500 short tons (1,400 t) using two 30-horsepower (22 kW) electric motors, one in each tower. In the event of electrical failure, backup electrical power is provided by a 167-horsepower (125 kW) diesel generator set. The main lift span can be raised to its full height in less than 90 seconds, although the total operating cycle can disrupt road traffic for 8–25 minutes. Clearance under the raised lift is 135 feet (41 m) to the highest anticipated water level, and the navigation channel is 270 feet (82 m) wide between the timber fenders protecting the tower piers. With the lift down, vertical clearance is only 18 feet (5.5 m).

=== Construction 1943–1960 ===
Less than thirty years after being completed, the eastern timber trestles of the 1919 bridge were in poor condition, and construction of replacement steel trusses began in 1943. Construction of the 1,300-foot (400 m) eastern steel truss section, consisting of seven 180-foot (55 m) truss spans, was completed in 1945 at a cost of US$730,000 (equivalent to $12,750,000 in 2024), and traffic was diverted from the timber trestles onto the steel trusses with a crossover. The US Corps of Engineers authorized replacement of the remaining portion of the bridge on 2 February 1950, with contracts awarded for US$960,000 (equivalent to $10,200,000 in 2024) to Lord and Bishop for the substructure and US$2,410,000 (equivalent to $25,620,000 in 2024) to Judson Pacific Murphy for the superstructure, with an additional US$124,000 (equivalent to $1,320,000 in 2024) contract to Pacific Murphy for the concrete slab approach spans.

The substructure was constructed from 4 April 1957 through 30 October 1958, and consists of the concrete piers and pilings. The first part of the superstructure erected was the east tower, which began on 4 December 1958. The superstructure was assembled in prefabricated segments at Pacific Murphy's Richmond yard and barged upstream to the construction site, where they were raised into place by a 100-short-ton (91 t) capacity barge crane. The sheaves at the top of each tower were lifted in place during high tides in order to reach the necessary height. The 1960 superstructure replacing the 1919 bascule bridge includes the four truss spans west of the main lift span and one truss span east of the main lift.

The construction of the bridge overlapped the planning process for the Sacramento Deep Water Ship Channel. When plans for the Deep Water Channel were complete, the eastern truss section of the new bridge were already complete, and the Channel rerouted ship traffic from its then-current course near the western bank (through the 1919 bascule) to a point 575 feet (175 m) east. A new crossover from the 1919 bascule bridge to the 1945 steel truss spans was built to avoid interference with substructure construction, and after the new lift portion was built, another crossover was built to reroute road traffic from the 1919 bascule to the 1960 bridge. Once the new bridge was complete, removal of the old structure was completed by July 1960.

=== 1967 Ilice crash ===
On 15 January 1967, the Italian freighter Ilice missed the raised draw while underway in heavy fog and crashed into the bridge just east of the draw, destroying an entire 144-foot (44 m), 400-short-ton (360 t)) truss span. No one was injured in the crash, although two youths who were stopped on the bridge while the freighter passed were tossed into the river and were subsequently rescued. Once Ilice was freed from the wreckage, she proceeded upriver to Sacramento to take on its scheduled load of rice. The remnants of the destroyed span were cut free from the bridge and dropped into the water. A temporary repair consisting of a steel trestle and two 72-foot (22 m) steel girders was erected after three weeks, with a ferry carrying traffic across the river while the temporary span was erected.

The Marine Boss crane barge, built for the heavy girder lifts during the construction of the 1967 San Mateo Bridge, erected a permanent 370-short-ton (340 t) replacement span (which included a 36-foot (11 m) cantilevered section to replace damage in the adjacent truss span) in June 1967 and removed both the wreckage from the original bridge and the temporary span at the same time.

=== Renamed for Helen Madere ===
In 1998, the Rio Vista Bridge was officially designated the Helen Madere Memorial Bridge after Helen Madere, a former vice-mayor of Rio Vista who served as that city's representative to the Solano Transportation Authority. The legislative act also cited her instrumental role in improving driver safety on California State Route 12.

=== Stuck ===
The bridge was raised to allow marine traffic to pass on July 7, 2012, and became stuck in that position for several hours due to a mechanical failure.

On August 9, 2018, the bridge again became stuck open for ten hours, until work crews were able to manually lower the draw. Marine traffic has the right-of-way, and the nearest detour around the bridge requires an additional 80 miles (130 km) of driving.

It was unable to be raised again until August 16, blocking marine shipments of rice and cement to the Port of West Sacramento. Caltrans made plans to manually raise and test the draw section after determining the motor gear box had failed, but warned motorists that repairs would take up to thirty days to complete, as the gearbox would need to be rebuilt in Alabama. The bridge was raised by hand, closing to road traffic overnight every few days to allow marine traffic to pass. Repairs to the bridge were completed on September 14.

== Proposed replacement ==
The Rio Vista Bridge lowering in August 2025.

The bridge opened 200 times for ship traffic during peak months in 2004 (nearly seven times per day); peak queues reached 200 vehicles extending 0.75 miles (1.21 km) and caused travel delays of up to 30 minutes. With ship traffic projected to increase to require as many as 400 openings by 2035, and traffic on State Route 12 also projected to increase, the City of Rio Vista, the Solano Transportation Authority, and Caltrans have all studied potential replacements for the Helen Madere Bridge. Two goals were first, to remove the drawbridge or at least reduce the necessity of raising the bridge and second, to expand the existing roadway from two lanes to four.

The first study was performed from 1991 through 1994 at the request of the City of Rio Vista, which proposed eight alternatives for crossings at, north of and south of the current SR-12 alignment. Fixed high-level bridges of various designs would require longer approaches to accommodate the required height with reasonable road grades, and resulted in the proposed alternative crossings north and south of the existing SR-12 alignment. Both a mid-level moveable bridge (with approximately 50 feet (15 m) of clearance with the draw down) and tunnel crossings were proposed for the existing alignment, with the mid-level bridge being named the preferred alternative in 1992.

In 2010, the Solano Transportation Authority expanded on the 1991–94 studies by carefully considering a subset of the proposed alternative crossings, with the tunnel at the existing SR-12 alignment now becoming the preferred alternative. Rio Vista businesses along the existing SR-12 alignment urged no change to the route, worried that moving SR-12 traffic could result in business closures. One of the proposed measures to raise funds would have imposed a toll on the existing bridge, and was met with similar resistance.

Caltrans performed a 2012 study for the entire SR-12 corridor, which concluded the cost of a replacement high-level bridge would be close to US$1,000,000,000 (equivalent to $1,369,600,000 in 2024). Ultimately, the 2012 study concluded a fixed high-level bridge or a tunnel are the preferred alternatives to allow passage of both ship and road traffic, calling it "the single most important investment that can be made to improve SR-12." The City of Rio Vista dropped its support for the north (Airport Road) alternative alignment in 2012.

=== Preservation project ===
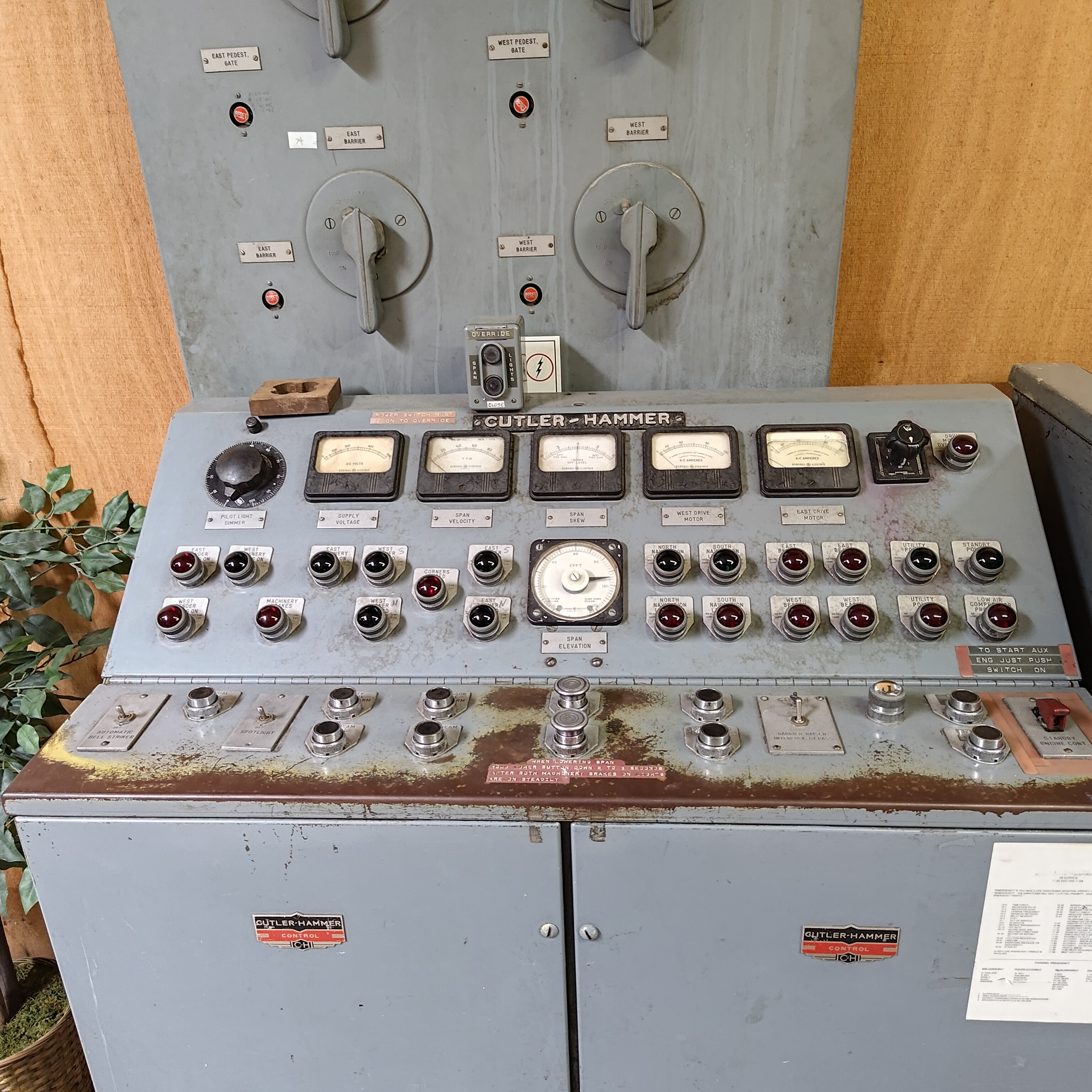
The control system used in the bridge until 2024, now located in the Rio Vista Museum

Caltrans is undertaking a two-part preservation project for the bridge. The first part of this work, which involves cleaning and painting the bridge, is expected to complete in winter 2020 at a cost of $37.1 million. After the bridge has been repainted, the mechanical and electrical systems will be upgraded, starting in spring 2022, at an anticipated cost to range between $11.9 and $19.2 million.
