= United States Army Reserve Center, Rio Vista =

Former army center in California, US

Coordinates: 38°8′45.33″N 121°41′38.67″W

United States Army Reserve Center, Rio Vista is a former United States Army Reserve center located in Rio Vista, Solano County, California. It was established in 1911 as the U.S. Engineers Storehouse, Rio Vista. It went through ten different names in its 81-year history, finally becoming the United States Army Reserve Center, Rio Vista California. It was closed in 1992 as a result of a BRAC recommendation.

The base is located on a 28-acre (11 ha) property south of town, on the west bank of the Sacramento River. It was acquired on July 21, 1911 by the U.S. Army Corps of Engineers to support the work of the Corps in dredging, clearing, and surveying the Sacramento River. The Corps had been working on the river since 1875, deepening it, straightening it, and removing obstacles such as trees, shoals, and even a 100-acre island which they completely eliminated. The goals of this work were to prevent flooding, make the river more navigable, and reclaim farmland. The base was used to house, store, or moor equipment, including the large suction barges used for these purposes.

The facility expanded over the next several decades, with additional buildings and even a marine railway. During World War II the function of the base shifted to focus on harbor serving vessels such as floating cranes, barges, tugs and small freighters. For this reason the base was reassigned to the U.S. Army Transportation Corps in 1952 with the primary function of storing and maintaining Army harbor craft. The facility's name was changed several times during the 1950s and 1960s. It reached peak activity in 1963 when it was reported to have 300 civilian employees and 350 vessels.

In 1963 a 4-acre (1.6 ha) parcel at the southern end of the facility was transferred to the U.S. Coast Guard to construct a Coast Guard station which is still in operation.

Activity at the base increased during the Vietnam War. In 1967 the base, now called the Rio Vista Marine Storage Activity, was placed under the command of Sharpe Army Depot. Its primary function was to prepare amphibious vehicles for shipment to Vietnam. Also in 1967 the base was unexpectedly pressed into local service when a freighter struck a local bridge and cut it in half. For the next several weeks while the bridge was being repaired, an Army LCM amphibious vehicle from the base was used as a "foot ferry", transporting residents back and forth across the river to attend school, go to work, and attend to other needs on the other side of the river.

In 1974 the base was renamed Rio Vista Storage Activity Site and control was transferred to the Presidio of San Francisco. Its mission was changed to Logistics Over The Shore (LOTS) operations training. In 1971 the USAT Resolute, a 338-foot (103 m) cargo and training ship, was moved to the Rio Vista facility.

In 1980 the facility was transferred to the U.S. Army Reserve and renamed the Rio Vista United States Army Reserve Center (Rio Vista USAR Center). It was primarily used for training purposes by engineering and transportation units.

In 1992 the facility was closed and all equipment was removed. The city of Rio Vista purchased the property from the federal government in 2003. It remains empty, but the city has proposed a redevelopment plan for the property. Two of the proposed uses are a research and monitoring station to study the river and the Delta, and a fish refuge and fish hatchery. Other proposed new uses include hiking and picnic areas, a boat dock, hotels, and a conference center.
