= Rio Vista, California =

City in California, United States

- City
- City of Rio Vista
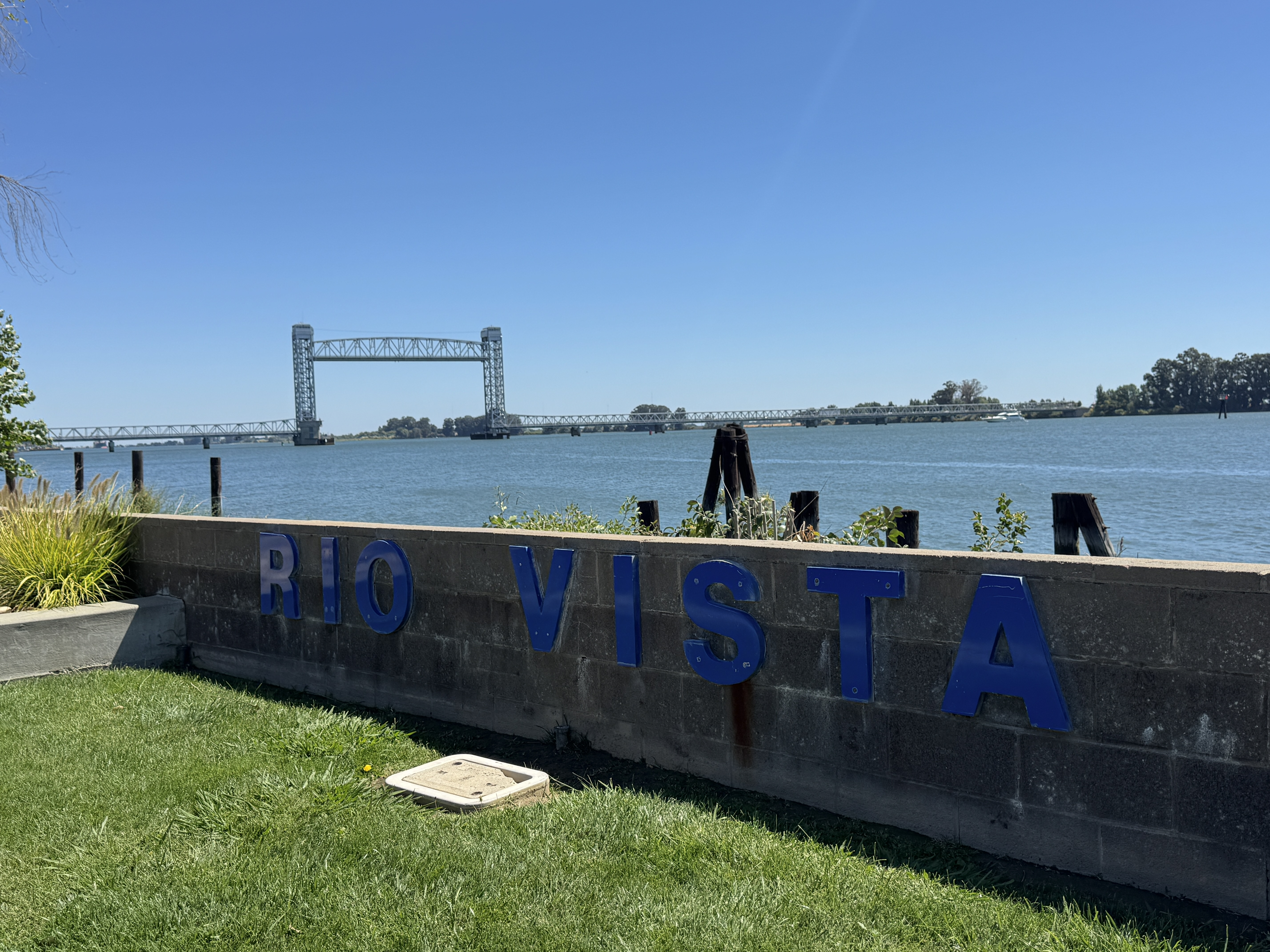
- The Helen Madere Memorial Bridge visible from the end of Main Street
- Motto: The Gateway to the Delta
- Interactive map of Rio Vista, California
- Location in the United States
- Coordinates: 38°9′50″N 121°41′45″W
- Country: United States
- State: California
- County: Solano
- Incorporated: January 6, 1894

Government
  - State senator: Christopher Cabaldon (D)
  - Assemblymember: Lori Wilson (D)
  - U. S. rep.: Mike Thompson (D)

Area
  - Total: 7.10 sq mi (18.38 km^{2})
  - Land: 6.60 sq mi (17.09 km^{2})
  - Water: 0.49 sq mi (1.28 km^{2}) 6.98%
- Elevation: 20 ft (6 m)

Population (2020)
  - Total: 10,005
  - Density: 1,516/sq mi (585.3/km^{2})
- Time zone: UTC-8 (Pacific)
  - Summer (DST): UTC-7 (PDT)
- ZIP code: 94571
- Area code: 707, 369
- FIPS code: 06-60984
- GNIS feature IDs: 277585, 2410955
- Website: www.riovistacity.com

Rio Vista (Spanish: Río Vista, thought to mean "River View" (Note: Rio Vista does not translate correctly to "River View". The original name was "Vista del Rio" (View of the river).)) is a city in the eastern end of Solano County, California, United States, in the Sacramento River Delta region of Northern California. The population was 10,005 at the 2020 census.

== Geography ==
Rio Vista is a small city in Solano County, approximately 50 miles (80 km) south of Sacramento, on the Sacramento River in the Sacramento River Delta.

According to the United States Census Bureau, the city has a total area of 7.1 square miles (18 km^{2}), of which 6.6 square miles (17 km^{2}) is land and 0.5 square miles (1.3 km^{2}) (6.98%) is water.

== Climate ==
According to the Köppen Climate Classification system, Rio Vista has a warm-summer Mediterranean climate, abbreviated "Csa" on climate maps.

== History ==
The present location of Rio Vista town center is several miles south of the original settlement. Colonel Nathan H. Davis founded "Brazos del Rio" near the entrance of Cache Slough at the Sacramento River, on the Rancho Los Ulpinos Mexican land grant, in 1858. The settlement changed its name to "Vista del Rio" (View of the river), and a third time within a year, to "Rio Vista" on the suggestion of the wife of the postmaster, Mrs Charles A. Kirkpatrick in 1858. The city's name combined the Spanish words for "river" and "view". The town was known as New Rio Vista briefly after it moved to its present location on higher ground following a series of floods in 1861 and 1862. The postal authorities established office in 1858. The community was officially incorporated as Rio Vista on December 30, 1893. During the internment of Japanese Americans, most of Rio Vista's Japanese citizens were sent to Gila River or Tule Lake. Rio Vista was the first city in California to fluoridate its water on October 25, 1951. The town removed their fluoridation equipment in 1956 following a city referendum organized by a chiropractor. The Rio Vista PTA petitioned the town to vote on water fluoridation in June 1970, and in April 1972 voted to not fluoridate. Rio Vista is home to the largest American producer of Belgian endive in the United States.

The city is served by Rio Vista Municipal Airport and is situated along the Rio Vista Highway (SR 12) between Fairfield and Lodi. The defunct Rio Vista Airport once featured a small restaurant inside of a DC-4. The highway crosses the Sacramento River via the Helen Madere Memorial Bridge, colloquially known as the Rio Vista Bridge.

=== Media ===
The City of Rio Vista has been served by a variety of newspapers, several of which changed names several times. The longest running of which was the River News-Herald and Isleton Journal, established in 1890. The paper printed its last article online on May 3, 2017. Rio Vista also was served by Rio Vista Banner (1919–1926) which became The Banner of the Delta (1926–1930). Other papers included The Delta Herald Isleton Journal (1924–1960) out of Isleton, Sacramento River News (1890–1895) and The Weekly Rio Vista Gleaner (September 6, 1877 - February 1879), Rio Vista Enterprise (September 22, 1877 - May 30, 1879). Currently the only newspaper is Rio Vista Beacon, a weekly paper mailed free to Rio Vista residents.

Rio Vista is also home to KRVH "Radio Rio", a classic rock station run by local high school students.

Historic names of the River News-Herald and Isleton Journal
| Published as | First edition | Last edition |
|---|---|---|
| The River News | 1895 | 1930 |
| The River News | 1932 | 1936 |
| River News and Banner | 1936 | 1957 |
| The River News-Herald | 1957 | 1963 |
| The River News-Herald & Isleton Journal | 1963 | 2017 |

=== Industry ===
Natural gas was discovered in the Rio Vista area in 1936 and the Rio Vista Field, (RVGU Rio Vista Gas Unit ) at one time there was a gas well behind RV City Hall in the middle of boat launch parking lot. Amerada Hess Corporation was the first major operations. When Amerada sold out to Sheridan Energy another buy out would soon take shape by Calpine Natural Gas. Calpine fell into the energy collapse when Enron went under then Calpine sold off a majority of its natural gas holdings to Rosetta Resources. Next buyer was Vintage Petroleum who sold out to and currently running operations California Resources Corporation as of 2022. Same address since 1936. Rio Vista Gas Unit was the largest natural gas field in California, became a major source of employment for the remainder of the 20th century. Other industries include agriculture, manufacturing and tourism. There are over 750 wind turbines belonging to the three renewable energy projects (Shiloh Wind Power Plant, NextEra Energy Resources' High Winds Energy Center and one owned by the Sacramento Municipal Utility District) on the Montezuma Hills, close to the city.

=== United States Army Reserve Center ===
From 1911 through 1992 Rio Vista was home to a United States Army Reserve Center. The facility was initially established as a base for river control activities by the U.S. Army Corps of Engineers. During the 1950s it was used by the U.S. Army Transportation Corps to store and maintain harbor craft, and during the 1960s and 1970s it was used to prepare amphibious vehicles for transportation to Vietnam and to train troops in their use. In 1980 it was transferred to the U.S. Army Reserve and in 1995 it was closed due to a BRAC decision. Beginning in 2012 the City of Rio Vista entered negotiations with the California Department of Water Resources and the United States Fish and Wildlife Service to develop the site into a "Fish Technology Center". In October 2023 the City Council reported the project had been significantly scaled down from the initial proposal. In December 2024 the city announced it would be working with the EPA's Targeted Brownfields Assessment program to develop an Environmental Site Assessment. The town also hosts a United States Coast Guard station, established in 1963.

=== Humphrey the humpback whale ===
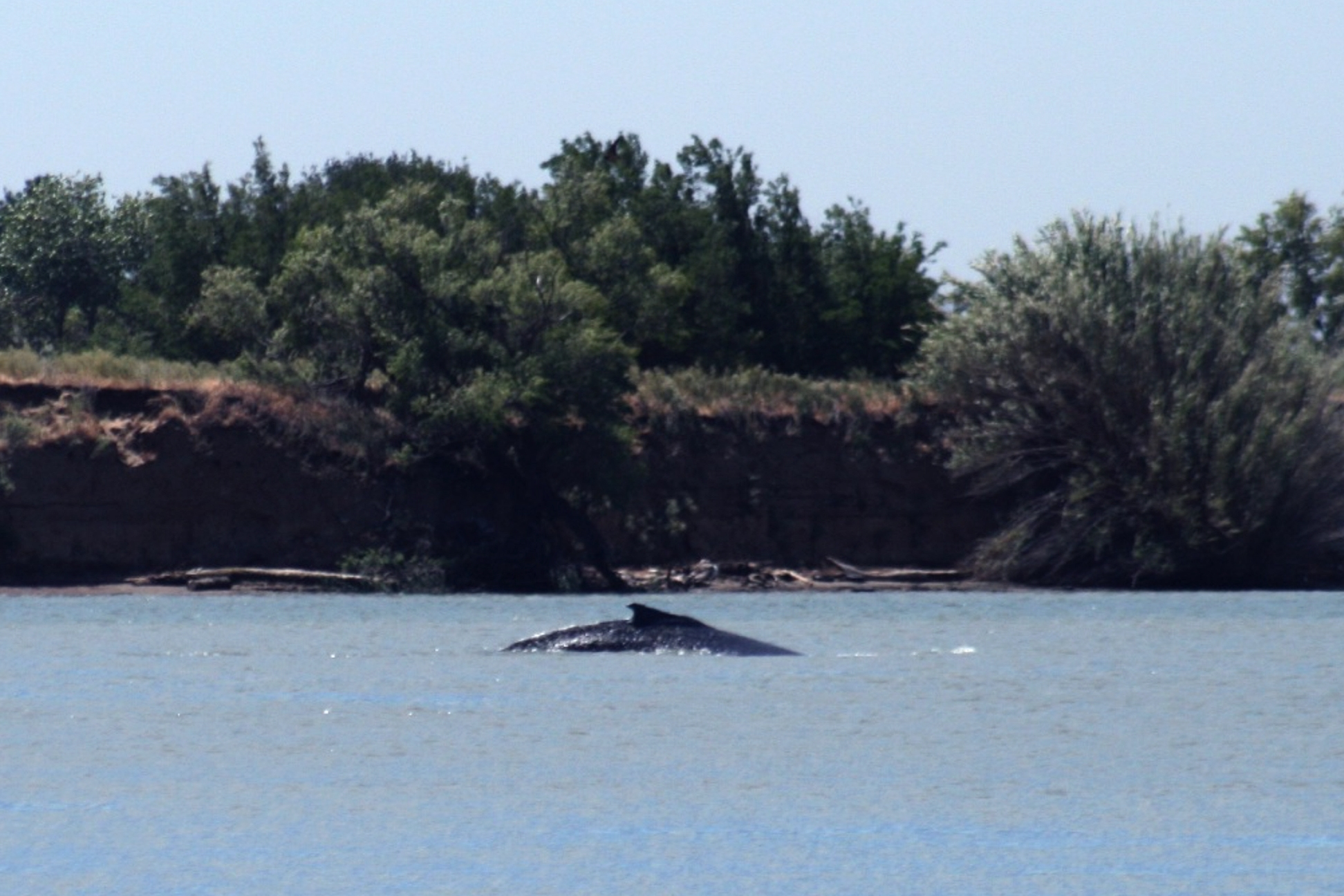
Humphrey the Whale in the Sacramento River

Rio Vista was visited by a lost humpback whale in 1985, despite being 60 miles (97 kilometers) up the Sacramento River from the Pacific Ocean. The young whale, nicknamed "Humphrey", attracted throngs of curiosity seekers before he was eventually guided back to sea by rescuers. The Army Reserve Unit (481st Transportation Company (Heavy Boat)) was activated to use their vessels (Landing Craft Utility (LCU)) to assist in the guiding of Humphrey back to the sea.

Again in May 2007, humpbacks were sighted in Rio Vista. "Delta" and "Dawn," mother and calf, stopped at least twice in the river near the town.

=== Flannery land purchases ===
In 2018, a group of investors called Flannery Associates LLC (licensed in the state of Delaware) began purchasing land in and around Rio Vista. By July 2023 Flannery owned 55,000 acres (22,000 ha), making them the largest private land-owner in Solano County. This included 30 - 40 acres within the city limits of Rio Vista. In May 2023 Flannery filed a $510 million lawsuit against 39 local landowners in Rio Vista and Collinsville accusing them of a conspiracy to "inflate the value of the land", legally a constraint of trade. By September 2024 only three defendants had not settled with CA Forever. In August 2023 the owners were publicly named in the New York Times for the first time. In September 2023 the group began a campaign under the subsidiary of California Forever to develop a 400,000 person city between Rio Vista and Suisun City on some 17,500 acres which lies 2,600 feet from the Rio Vista city limits, an action currently prohibited by the county's orderly growth imitative. Eventually submitting a ballot proposal under the name "East Solano Plan" in February 2024 and withdrew their proposal on July 22, 2024, after spending nearly $9 million on the ad campaign.

== Demographics ==
Historical population
| Census | Pop. | Note | %± |
|---|---|---|---|
| 1870 | 319 | | — |
| 1880 | 666 | | 108.8% |
| 1890 | 648 | | −2.7% |
| 1900 | 682 | | 5.2% |
| 1910 | 884 | | 29.6% |
| 1920 | 1,104 | | 24.9% |
| 1930 | 1,309 | | 18.6% |
| 1940 | 1,666 | | 27.3% |
| 1950 | 1,831 | | 9.9% |
| 1960 | 2,616 | | 42.9% |
| 1970 | 3,135 | | 19.8% |
| 1980 | 3,142 | | 0.2% |
| 1990 | 3,316 | | 5.5% |
| 2000 | 4,571 | | 37.8% |
| 2010 | 7,360 | | 61.0% |
| 2020 | 10,005 | | 35.9% |
U.S. Decennial Census

=== 2020 census ===
As of the 2020 census, Rio Vista had a population of 10,005 and a population density of 1,515.9 inhabitants per square mile (585.3/km^{2}).

The age distribution was 11.8% under the age of 18, 4.6% aged 18 to 24, 14.8% aged 25 to 44, 23.6% aged 45 to 64, and 45.1% aged 65 or older. The median age was 62.8 years. For every 100 females there were 90.6 males, and for every 100 females age 18 and over there were 88.5 males.

The census reported that 99.9% of the population lived in households, 0.1% lived in non-institutionalized group quarters, and no one was institutionalized. 99.4% of residents lived in urban areas, while 0.6% lived in rural areas.

There were 4,881 households, of which 14.5% had children under the age of 18 living in them. Of all households, 50.9% were married-couple households, 6.0% were cohabiting-couple households, 27.2% had a female householder with no spouse or partner present, and 15.9% had a male householder with no spouse or partner present. 31.6% of households were one-person households, and 22.0% had someone living alone who was 65 or older. The average household size was 2.05, and there were 3,046 families (62.4% of all households).

There were 5,199 housing units at an average density of 787.7 units per square mile (304.1 units/km^{2}). Of the housing units, 4,881 (93.9%) were occupied and 318 (6.1%) were vacant. Of occupied units, 80.9% were owner-occupied and 19.1% were renter-occupied. The homeowner vacancy rate was 2.6%, and the rental vacancy rate was 5.0%.

Racial composition as of the 2020 census
| Race | Number | Percent |
|---|---|---|
| White | 6,766 | 67.6% |
| Black or African American | 824 | 8.2% |
| American Indian and Alaska Native | 93 | 0.9% |
| Asian | 622 | 6.2% |
| Native Hawaiian and Other Pacific Islander | 41 | 0.4% |
| Some other race | 584 | 5.8% |
| Two or more races | 1,075 | 10.7% |
| Hispanic or Latino (of any race) | 1,602 | 16.0% |

=== 2023 ACS 5-year estimates ===
In 2023, the US Census Bureau estimated that the median household income was $86,970, and the per capita income was $51,519. About 1.8% of families and 8.0% of the population were below the poverty line.

=== 2010 census ===
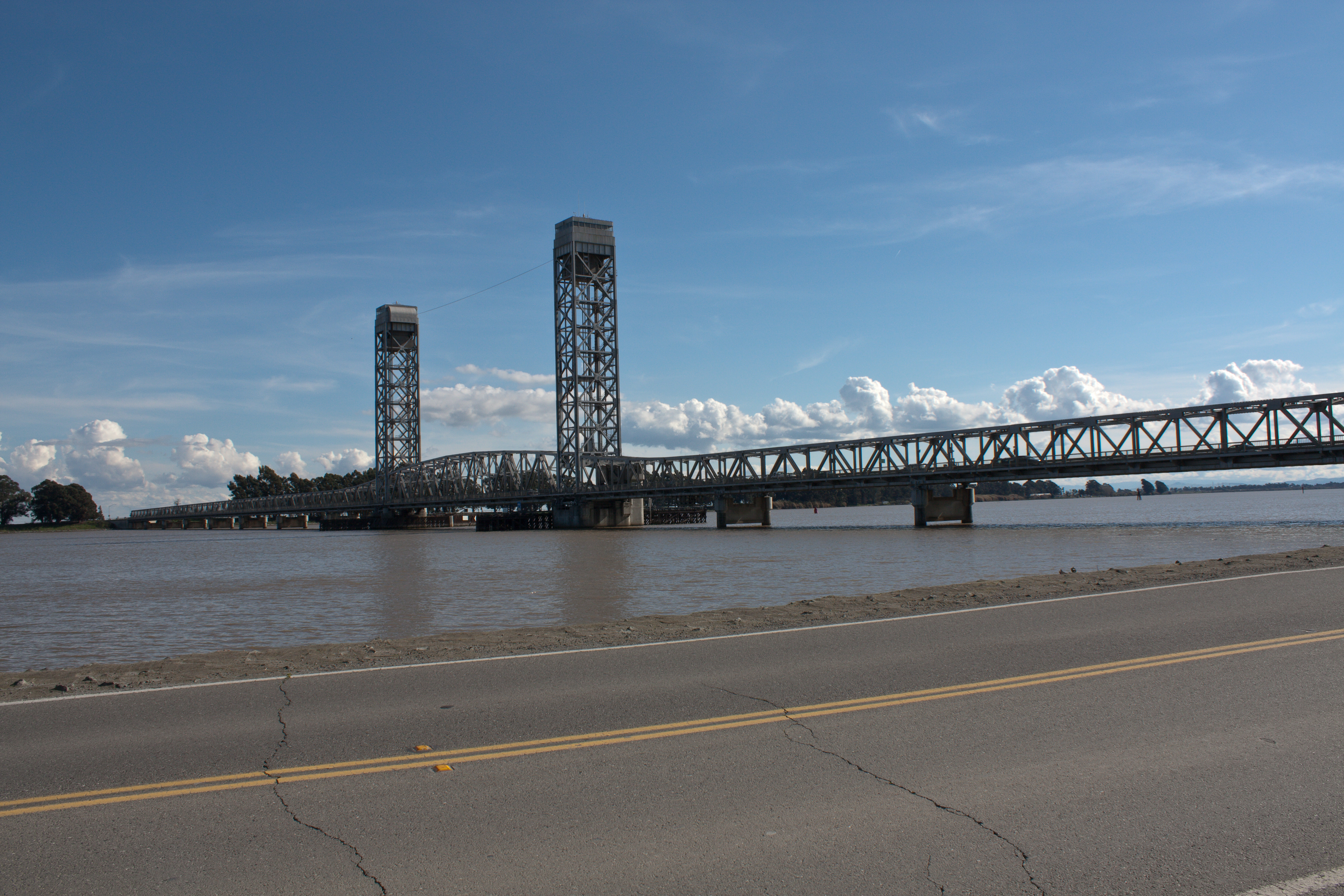
Bridge across the Sacramento River at Rio Vista

At the 2010 census Rio Vista had a population of 7,360. The population density was 1,037.4 inhabitants per square mile (400.5/km^{2}). The racial makeup of Rio Vista was 6,003 (81.6%) White, 372 (5.1%) African American, 53 (0.7%) Native American, 359 (4.9%) Asian, 15 (0.2%) Pacific Islander, 288 (3.9%) from other races, and 270 (3.7%) from two or more races. Hispanic or Latino of any race were 914 people (12.4%).

The census reported that 100% of the population lived in households.

There were 3,454 households, 626 (18.1%) had children under the age of 18 living in them, 1,846 (53.4%) were opposite-sex married couples living together, 255 (7.4%) had a female householder with no husband present, 139 (4.0%) had a male householder with no wife present. There were 146 (4.2%) unmarried opposite-sex partnerships, and 24 (0.7%) same-sex married couples or partnerships. 1,045 households (30.3%) were one person and 605 (17.5%) had someone living alone who was 65 or older. The average household size was 2.13. There were 2,240 families (64.9% of households); the average family size was 2.60.

The age distribution was 1,145 people (15.6%) under the age of 18, 349 people (4.7%) aged 18 to 24, 1,089 people (14.8%) aged 25 to 44, 2,400 people (32.6%) aged 45 to 64, and 2,377 people (32.3%) who were 65 or older. The median age was 57.2 years. For every 100 females, there were 92.6 males. For every 100 females age 18 and over, there were 91.3 males.

There were 3,890 housing units at an average density of 548.3 units per square mile (211.7 units/km^{2}), of which 77.7% were owner-occupied and 22.3% were occupied by renters. The homeowner vacancy rate was 2.7%; the rental vacancy rate was 13.7%. 75.1% of the population lived in owner-occupied housing units and 24.9% lived in rental housing units.

== Notable residents ==
- Craig Breedlove, five-time world land speed record holder, lived in and had an engineering facility in the city.
- Bill Wight, Major League Baseball pitcher and scout

== Gallery ==
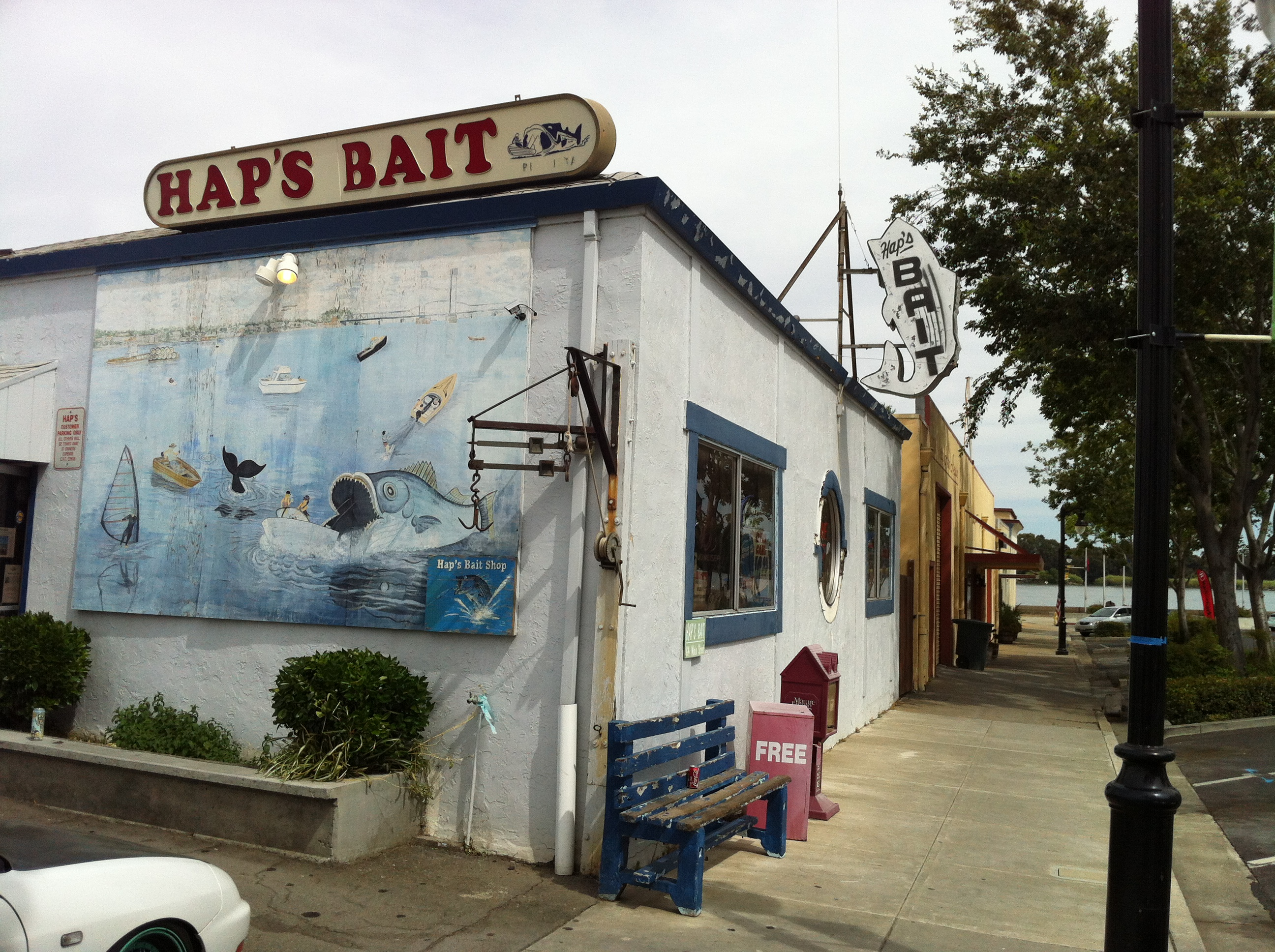
Hap's Bait & Tackle (Now Hap's Taps Brew house)

Foster's Bighorn Bar and Restaurant

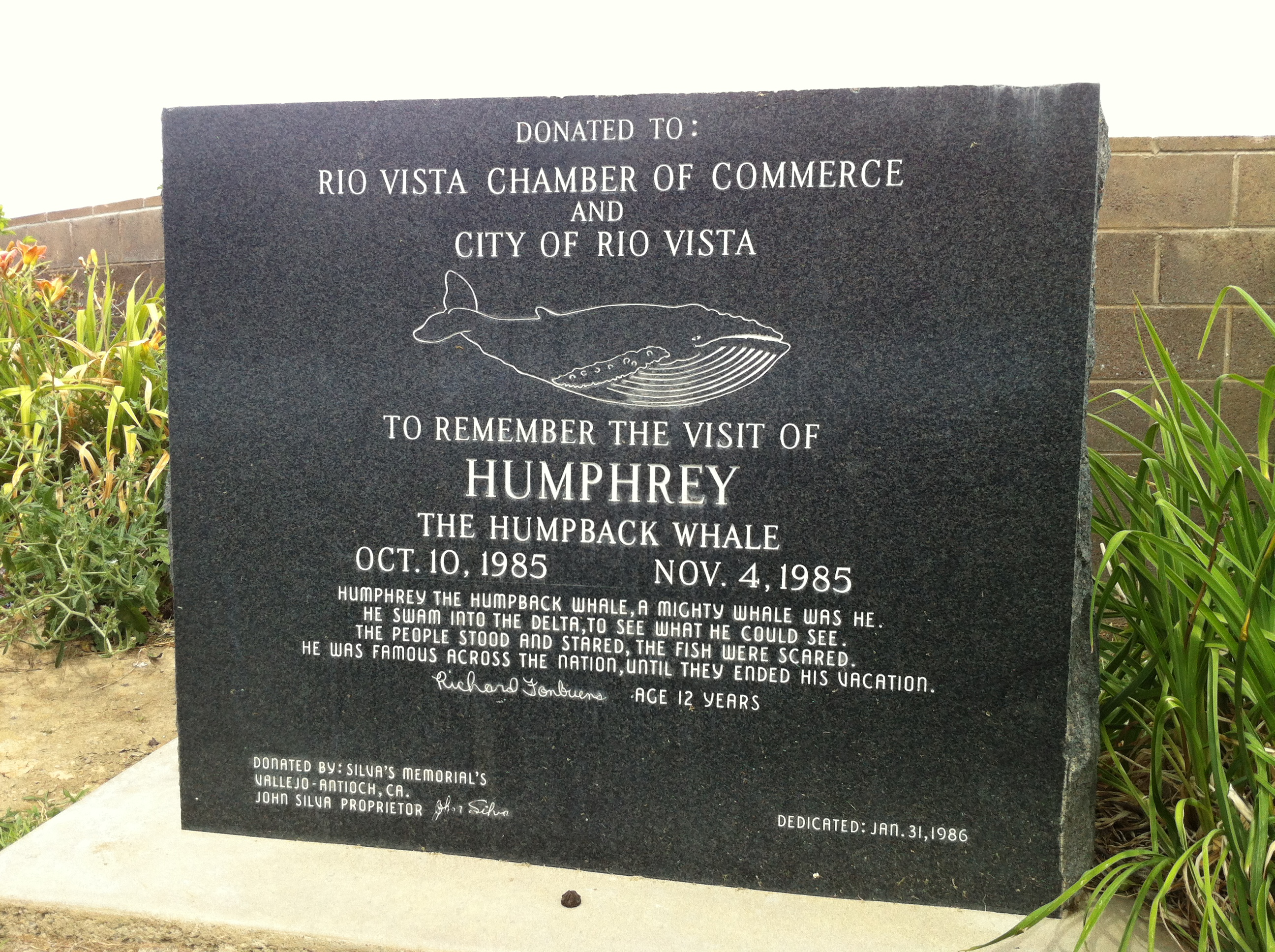
Humphrey The Humpback Whale Monument

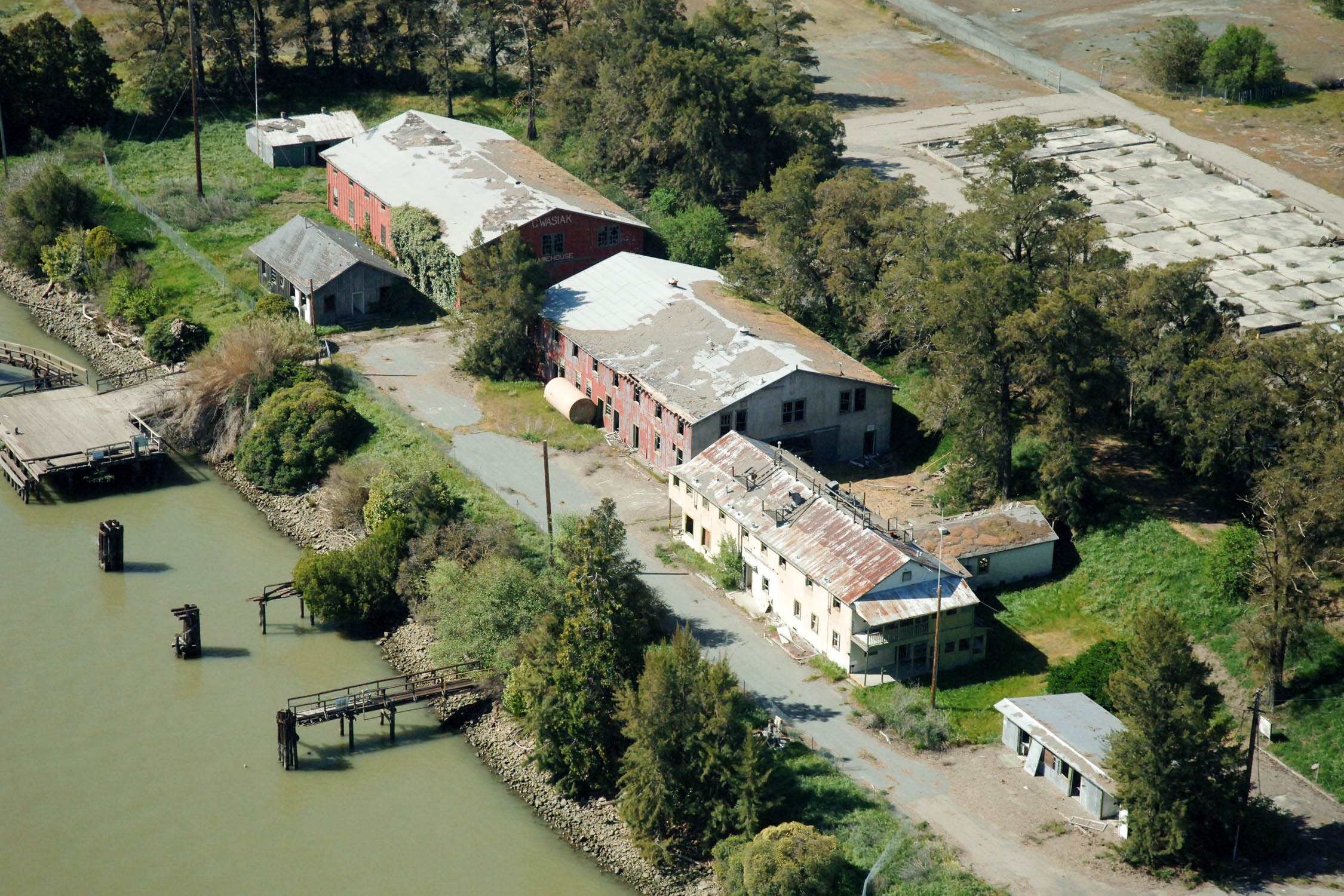
Former Army Base, proposed "Delta Research Station"

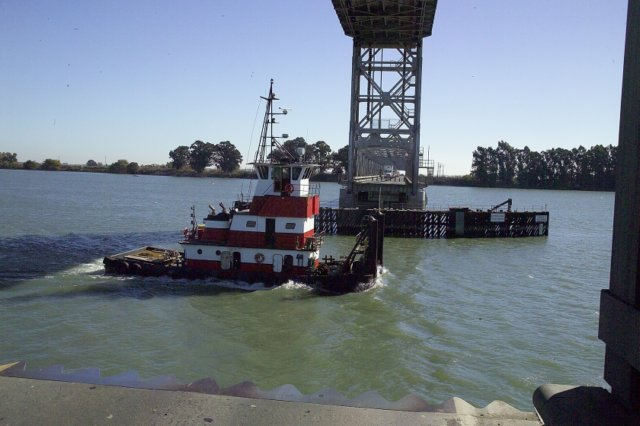
A boat passes under the Rio Vista Bridge

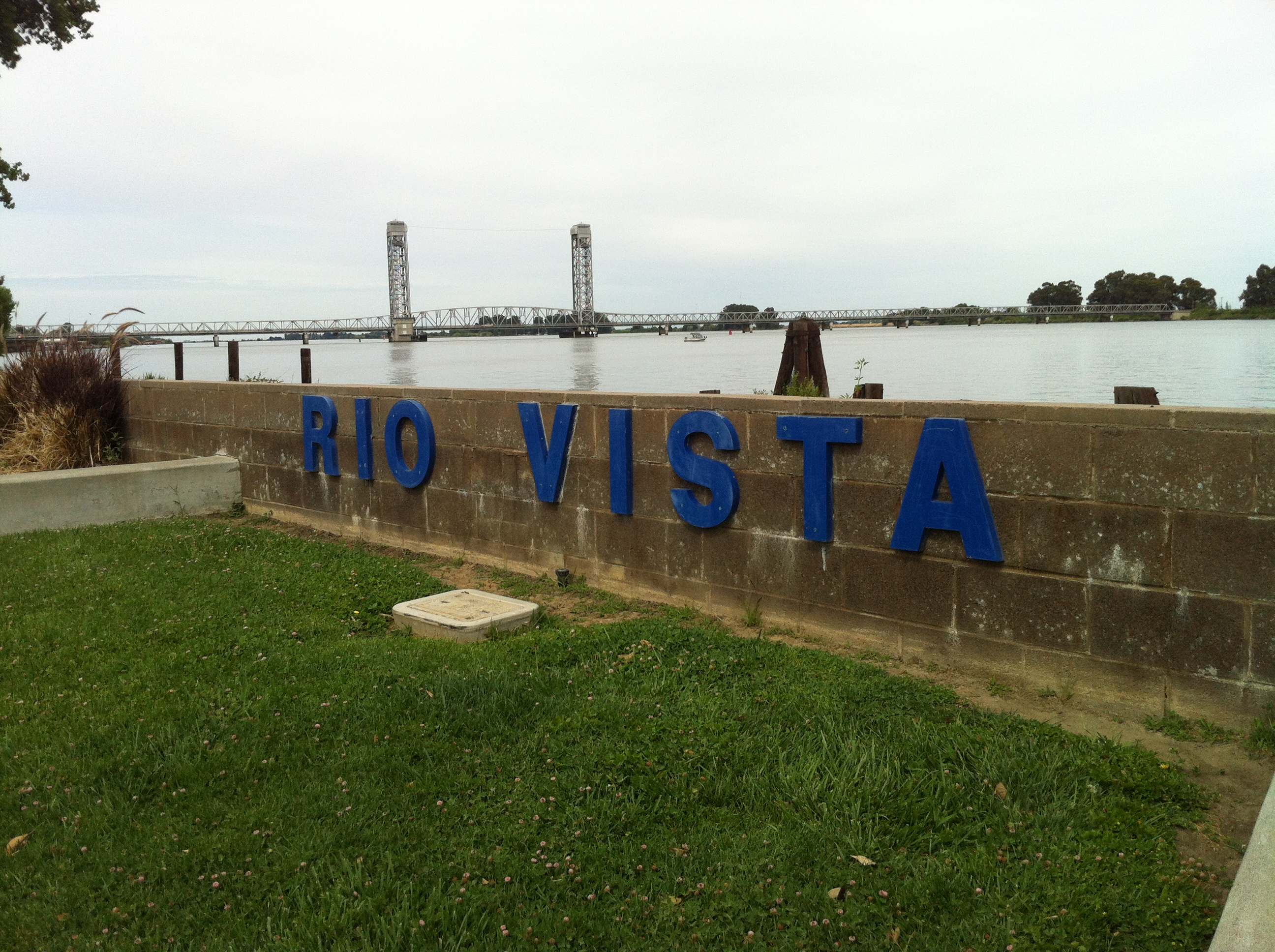
Sacramento River from Rio Vista, California

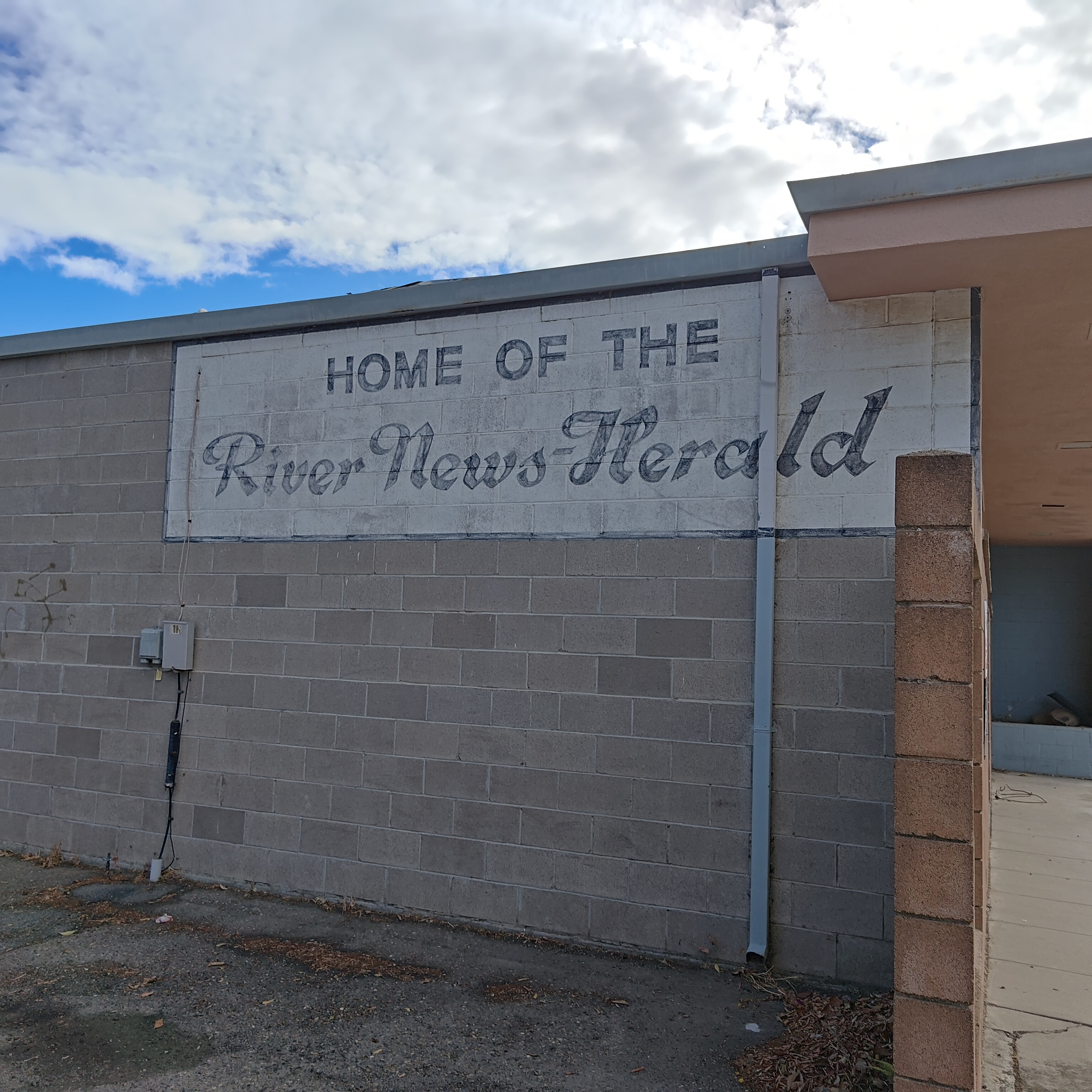
Sign advertising the office of the first newspaper to serve Rio Vista, The River News Herald.

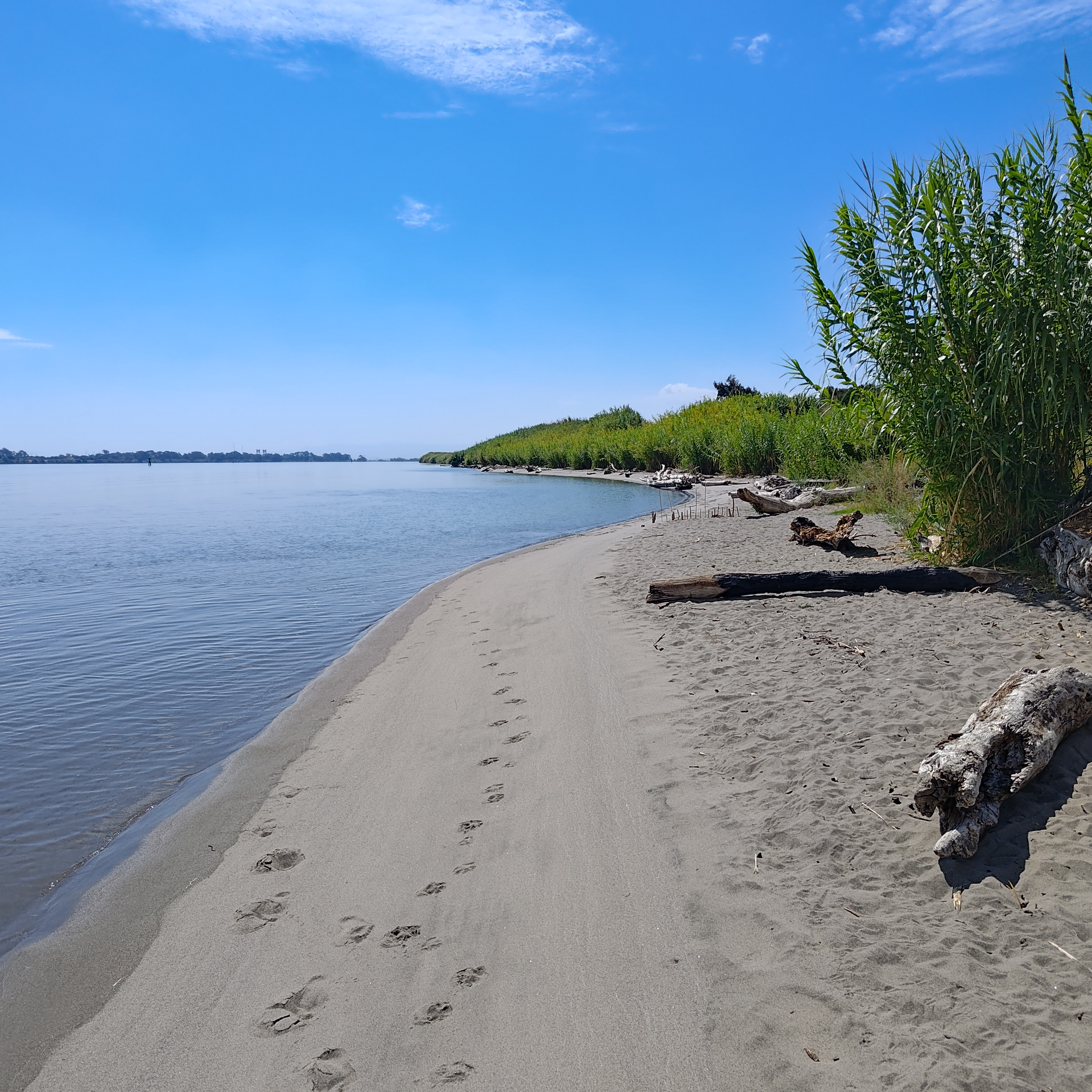
"Sandy Beach" located near the Rio Vista Coast Guard Station

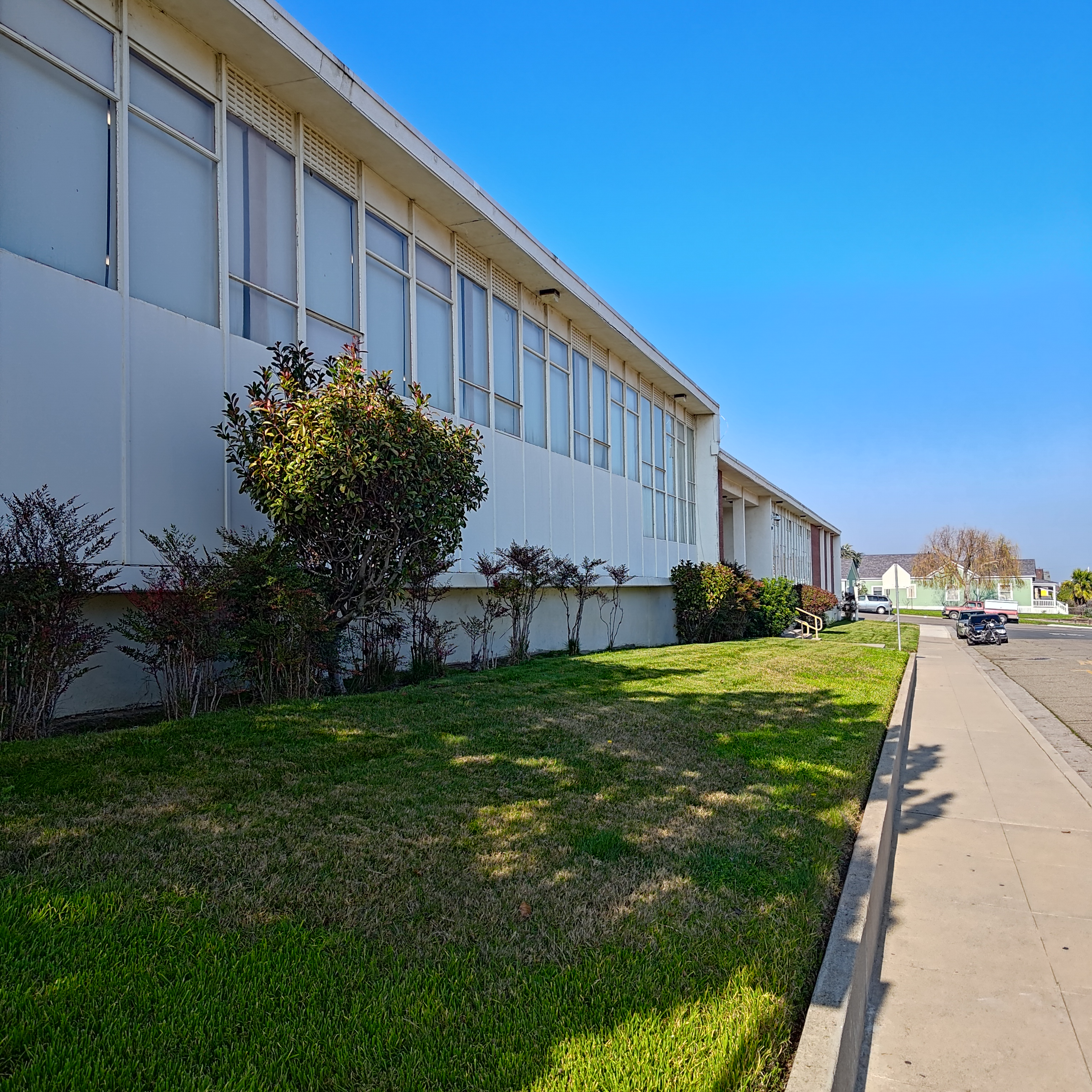
Rio Vista High School

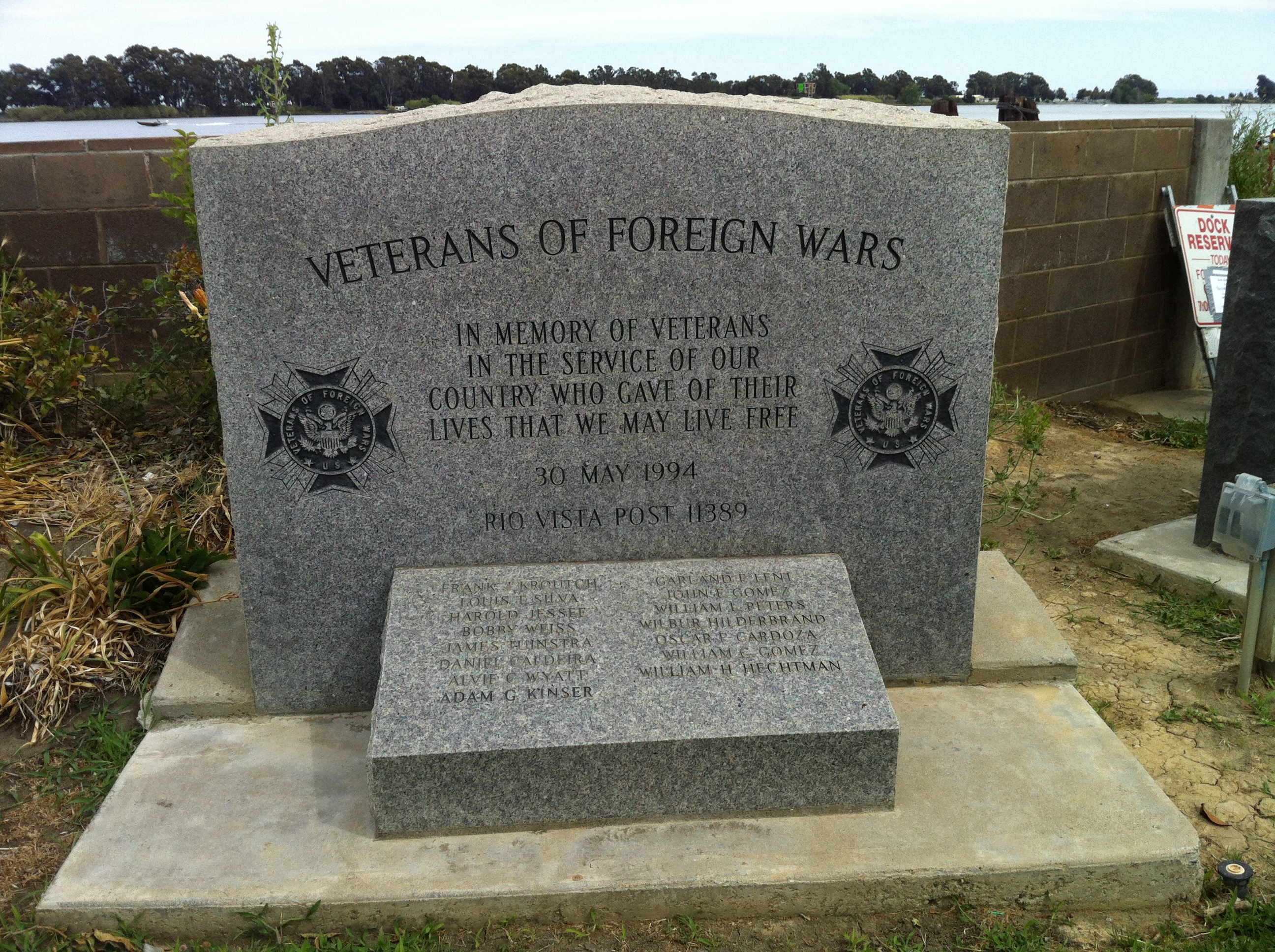
VFW Memorial

== See also ==
- List of cities and towns in California
- List of cities and towns in the San Francisco Bay Area
