= Collinsville, California =

Unincorporated community in California, United States

Coordinates: 38°04′37″N 121°50′56″W

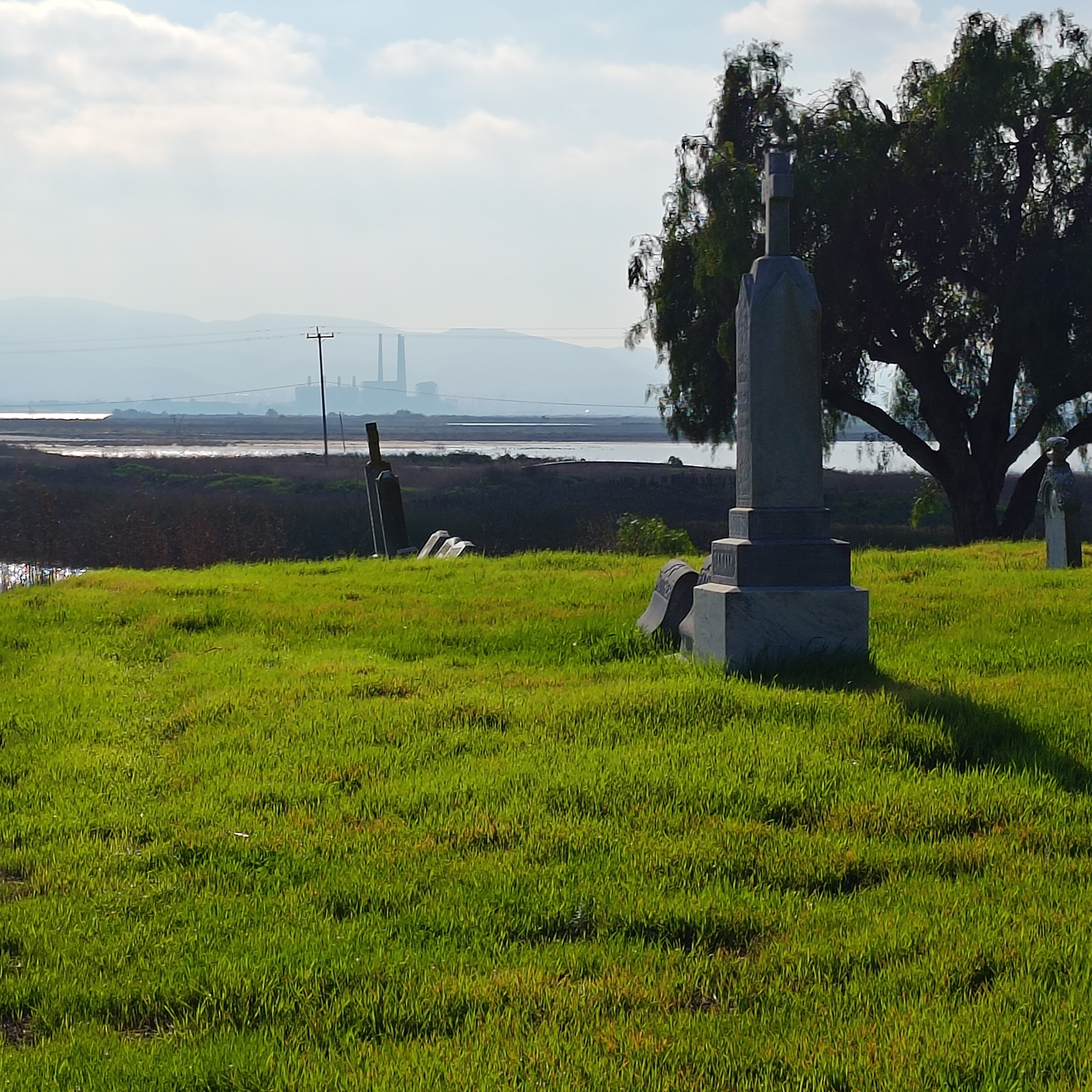
Collinsville cemetery, looking towards Antioch

Collinsville is a rural unincorporated community in Solano County, California, United States. It is located at the mouth of the Sacramento River, on the north side of the river where it debouches into the Suisun Bay. Collinsville is effectively separated from the more intense urban development in Contra Costa County immediately across the river, as no bridge exists connecting the two areas. The area was once a proposed spot for a major chemical plant for the Dow Chemical Company in the 1980s; though nothing of the sort materialized. The community is in ZIP code 94585 and is served by area code 707.

== History ==
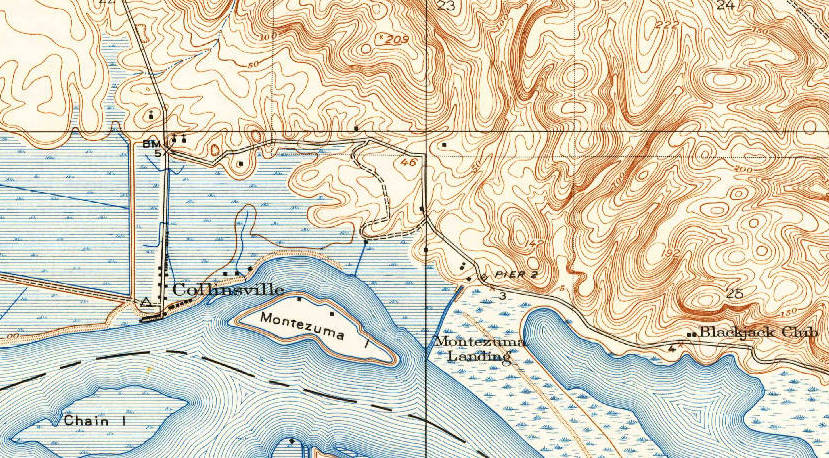
Collinsville in 1918

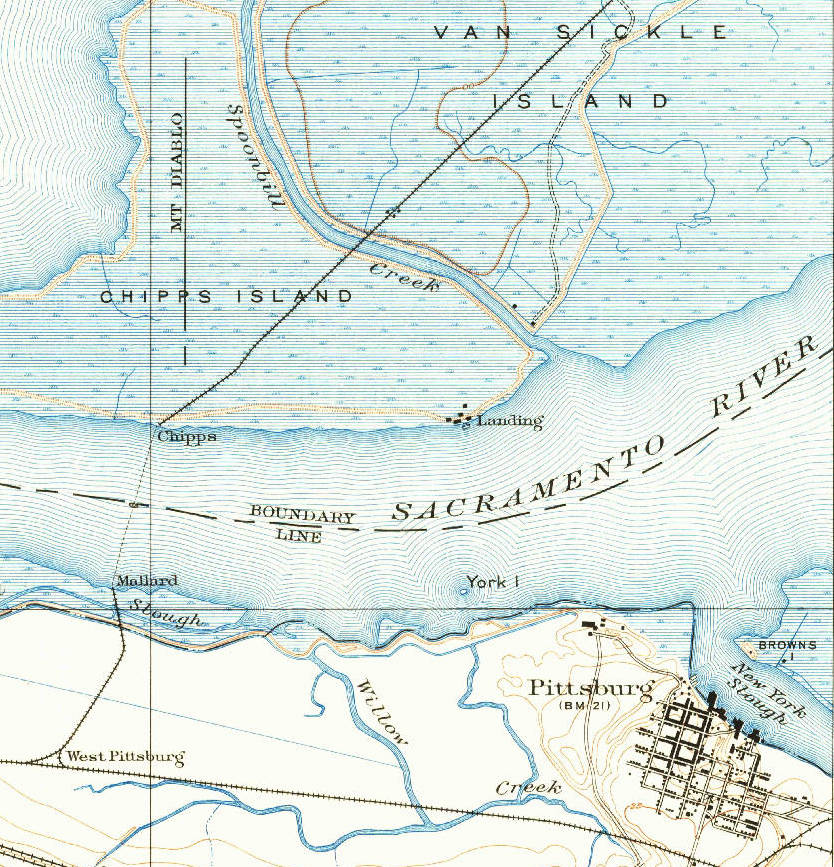
Sacramento Northern train crossing in 1918 near Collinsville

Collinsville was part of the Montezuma Township when purchased by C. J. Collins around 1859. S. C. Bradshaw later purchased the land and renamed it Newport in 1867. He tried to sell pieces of the land to people on the East Coast telling them that it was going to be a big railroad town. The land was later sold to E. I. Upham who returned the name Collinsville back to the town in 1872.

At one point, one of the passenger railroad lines between Sacramento and San Francisco passed through Collinsville (before the bridges were built). The train would unbuckle at Collinsville, and be pulled across the Delta by barge (requiring several trips), and then be rebuckled together on the other side at the foot of Railroad Avenue in Pittsburg, and resume its trip to San Francisco.

On July 4, 2014, nearly half the town was lost due to a fire.

== Government ==
In the California State Legislature, Collinsville is in the 3rd senatorial district, represented by Democrat Christopher Cabaldon, and in the 11th Assembly district, represented by Democrat Lori Wilson.

In the United States House of Representatives, Collinsville is in California's 3rd congressional district, represented by Independent Kevin Kiley.
