= Transportation in California =

Welcome to California road sign

California's transportation system is complex and dynamic. Although known for its car culture and extensive network of freeways and roads, the state also has a vast array of rail, sea, and air transport. Several subway, light rail, and commuter rail networks are found in many of the state's largest population centers. In addition, with the state's location on the West Coast of the United States, several important ports in California handle freight shipments from the Pacific Rim and beyond. A number of airports are also spread out across the state, ranging from small general aviation airports to large international hubs like Los Angeles International Airport and San Francisco International Airport.

However, in a state with over 39 million people, rapid population expansion, and diverse terrain and weather, that system is under pressure to stay ahead of population growth and transportation needs.

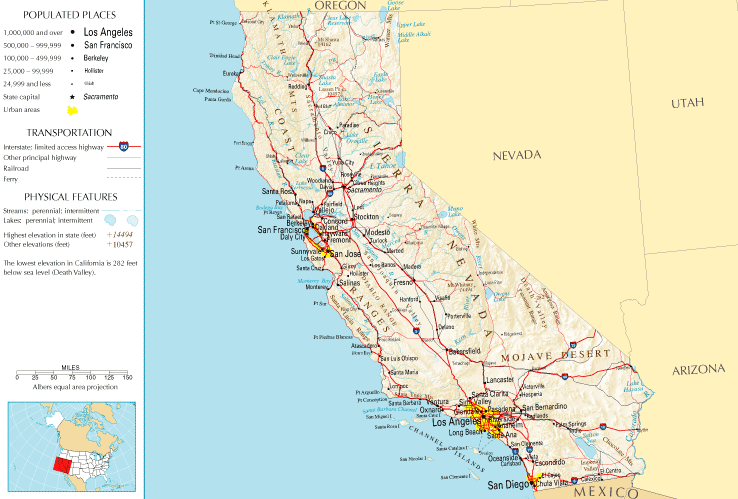
Map of California showing the primary cities and roadways

== Roads and highways ==
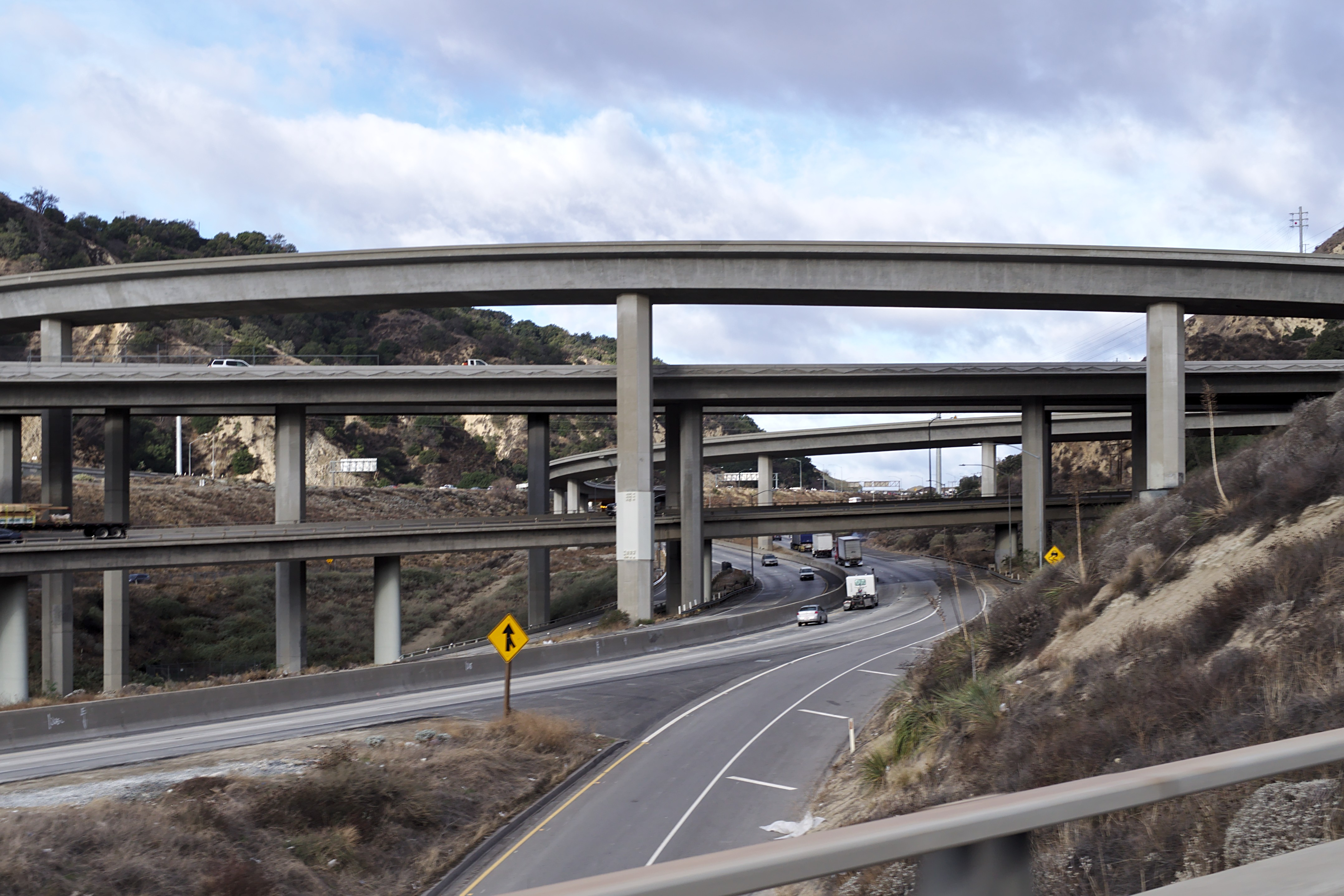
Caltrans builds tall "stack" interchanges with soaring ramps, such as the Newhall Pass interchange

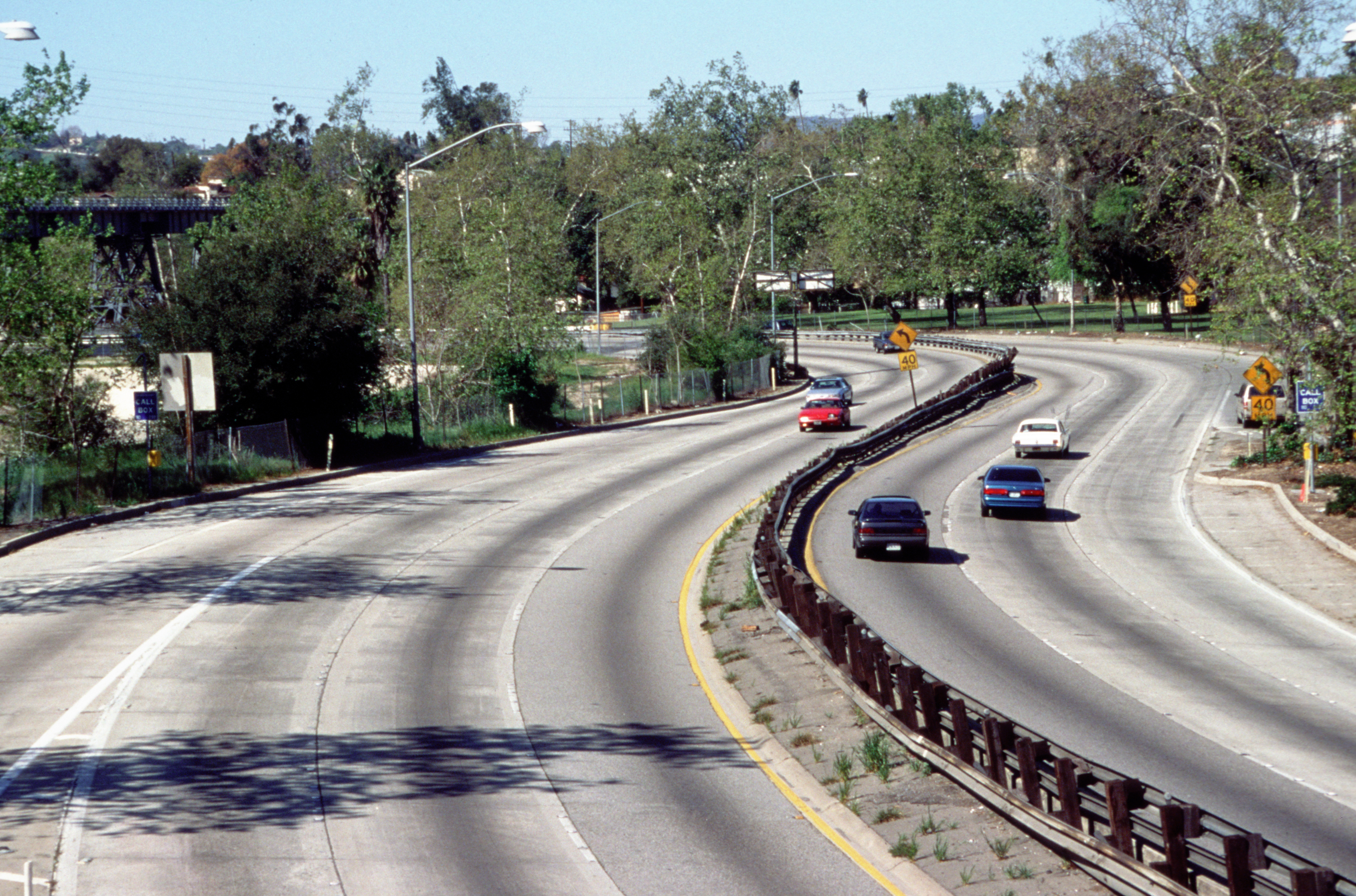
Along the historic Arroyo Seco Parkway between Los Angeles and Pasadena

California is known for its car culture; by the end of 2010, the California Department of Motor Vehicles had 23,799,513 driver's licenses and a total of 31,987,821 registered vehicles on file. The state's residents typically take to the roads for their commutes, errands, and vacations, giving California's cities a reputation for severe traffic congestion.

California's vast terrain is connected by an extensive system of freeways, expressways, and highways, all maintained by the California Department of Transportation (Caltrans) and patrolled by the California Highway Patrol (CHP), except for the numbered expressways in Santa Clara County which were built and maintained by the county itself. The main north–south arteries are U.S. Route 101 (US 101), which travels close to the coast from Downtown Los Angeles, across the Golden Gate Bridge, and to the Oregon state line, and Interstate 5 (I-5), which travels inland from the Mexico–United States border to the Oregon state line, effectively bisecting the entire state. In addition, a major north–south artery is State Route 99 (SR 99), which travels from near Bakersfield to near Red Bluff; SR 99 is largely parallel to I-5, and connects the Central Valley cities not connected by the Interstate.

Perhaps it is a testament to California's sheer size that although it has one of the most extensive freeway systems in the United States, it contains many of the largest cities in the United States not served by an Interstate Highway, including the two largest, Fresno (pop. 471,479) and Bakersfield (pop. 247,057). These cities, along with Modesto and Visalia, are passed by as I-5 veers west to avoid the congestion of the populated eastern side of the Central Valley as it connects Sacramento and Los Angeles.

The state's freeway network has expanded ever since the Arroyo Seco Parkway, the first freeway in the Western United States, connecting Los Angeles and Pasadena, opened in 1940. However, the state is not immune to freeway revolts, such as those that have prevented a freeway in San Francisco between the Golden Gate Bridge and the San Francisco–Oakland Bay Bridge, and an expansion of I-710 through South Pasadena.

Traffic signs, road surface markings, and traffic signals on all public streets and highways throughout the state are regulated by the California Vehicle Code and standardized in the California Manual on Uniform Traffic Control Devices.

=== Toll roads and bridges ===
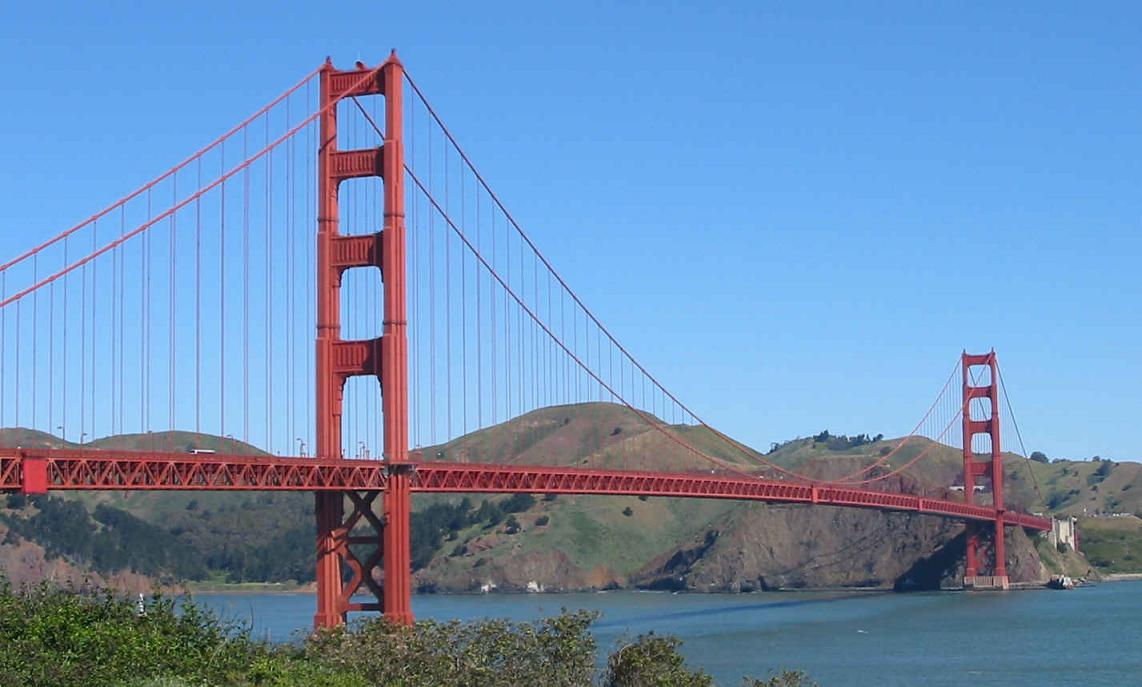
The Golden Gate Bridge in San Francisco

Almost all California highways are non-toll roads, including several major non-toll bridges in Los Angeles, Sacramento, and San Diego. However, there are four toll roads in Southern California, and eight toll bridges in the San Francisco Bay Area (including the state's most famous highway bridge, the Golden Gate Bridge). These toll facilities, along with several high-occupancy toll lanes, use the statewide electronic toll collection system known as FasTrak.

| SF Bay Area toll bridges | So. California toll roads |
|---|---|
| Antioch Bridge; Benicia–Martinez Bridge; Carquinez Bridge; Dumbarton Bridge; Golden Gate Bridge; Richmond–San Rafael Bridge; San Francisco–Oakland Bay Bridge; San Mateo–Hayward Bridge | Eastern Toll Road; the entire length of State Route 261; the northern part of State Route 133; the northern half of State Route 241; Foothill Toll Road; San Joaquin Hills Toll Road; South Bay Expressway |

=== Interstate Highways ===
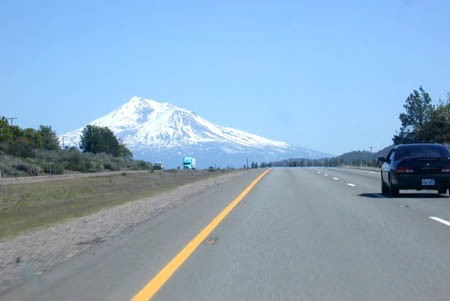
Along southbound I-5 approaching Mount Shasta

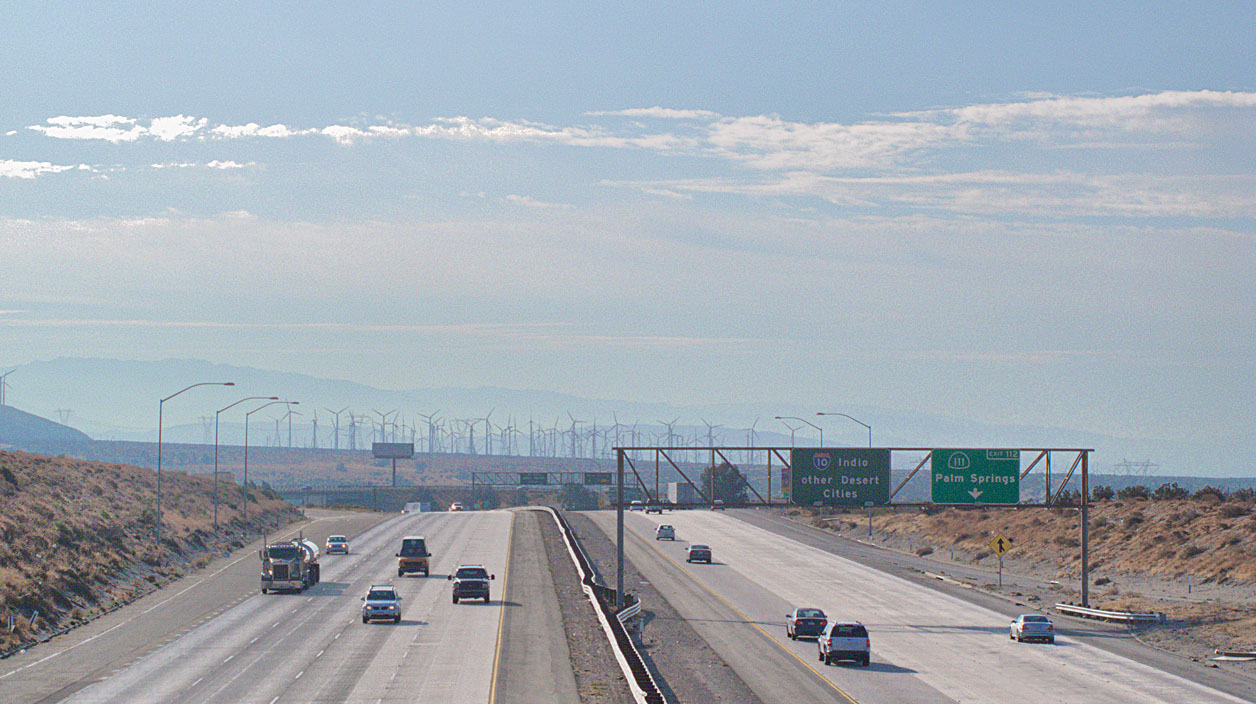
I-10 with the San Gorgonio Pass wind farm in the background

Primary Interstate Highways in California include:

| Interstate 5: Bisects the state from the Mexican border to Oregon, linking the major cities of San Diego, Santa Ana, Los Angeles, Stockton, Sacramento, and Redding. |
| Interstate 8: Travels east from San Diego to the Imperial Valley before crossing into Arizona west of Yuma. |
| Interstate 10: Travels east from Santa Monica through Los Angeles, San Bernardino, and the Coachella Valley to Arizona. |
| Interstate 15: Originating from San Diego, serves as the major route from Southern California to Las Vegas, Nevada. |
| Interstate 40: Travels east from Barstow across the Mojave Desert to Needles before entering into Arizona. |
| Interstate 80: Travels northeast from San Francisco through Sacramento and over the Sierra Nevada mountain range before crossing into Nevada west of Reno. |

Auxiliary (three-digit) Interstates are located in the Greater Los Angeles area, the Bay Area, and the San Diego Area:

Greater Los Angeles Area

- Interstate 105
- Interstate 110
- Interstate 210
- Interstate 215
- Interstate 405
- Interstate 605
- Interstate 710

San Francisco Bay Area

- Interstate 205
- Interstate 238
- Interstate 280
- Interstate 380
- Interstate 505
- Interstate 580
- Interstate 680
- Interstate 780
- Interstate 880
- Interstate 980

San Diego Area

- Interstate 805

=== U.S. Routes ===
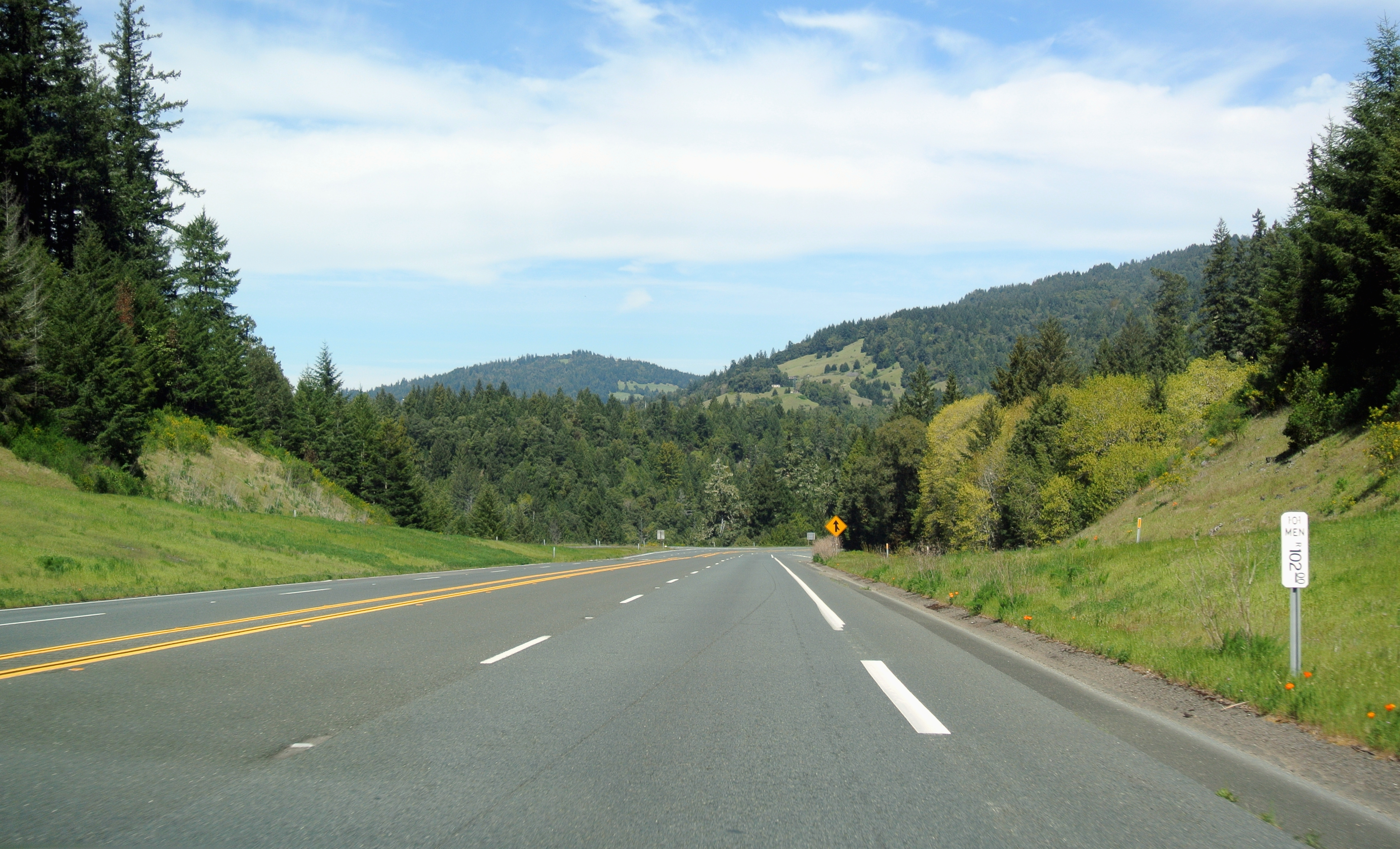
U.S. Route 101 in Mendocino County

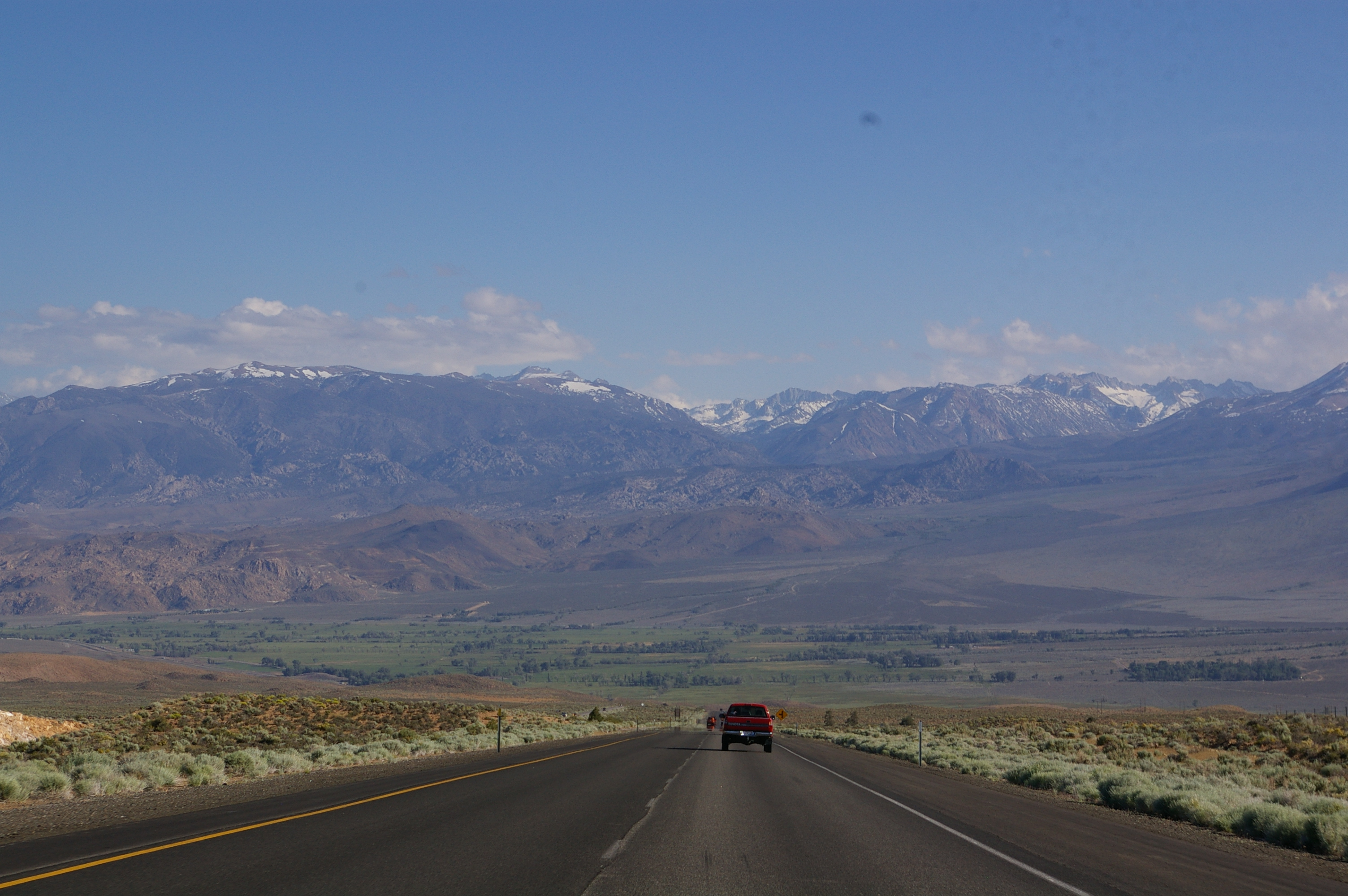
U.S. Route 395 descending from the Sierra Nevada into Owens Valley

The following are United States Numbered Highways in California:

| US 6: Travels from Bishop east to Central Nevada. |
| US 50: Heads east from the Sacramento area through the South Lake Tahoe area before crossing into Nevada en route to Carson City. |
| US 95: Enters into California from Arizona through a concurrency with I-10. US 95 then splits from I-10 in Blythe, then travels north to Needles before crossing into Nevada en route to Las Vegas |
| US 97: Serves as the primary connection from the City of Weed to Klamath Falls, Oregon. |
| US 101: The primary north-south U.S. Highway in California, connecting Los Angeles with the Central Coast, the San Francisco Bay, and the North Coast. |
| US 199: Serves as the primary connection from the Crescent City area to Grants Pass, Oregon. |
| US 395: A major north–south route in the eastern areas of the state, connecting the Mojave Desert with the Owens Valley and the Eastern Sierra Nevada. The route then clips into Nevada to pass through Carson City and Reno, before returning to California to serve the Honey Lake and Modoc Plateau areas. |

California still uses an older, cut-out version of the U.S. Route shield instead of the current design used in the other U.S. states, printed on a square blank with a black background.

=== State Routes ===
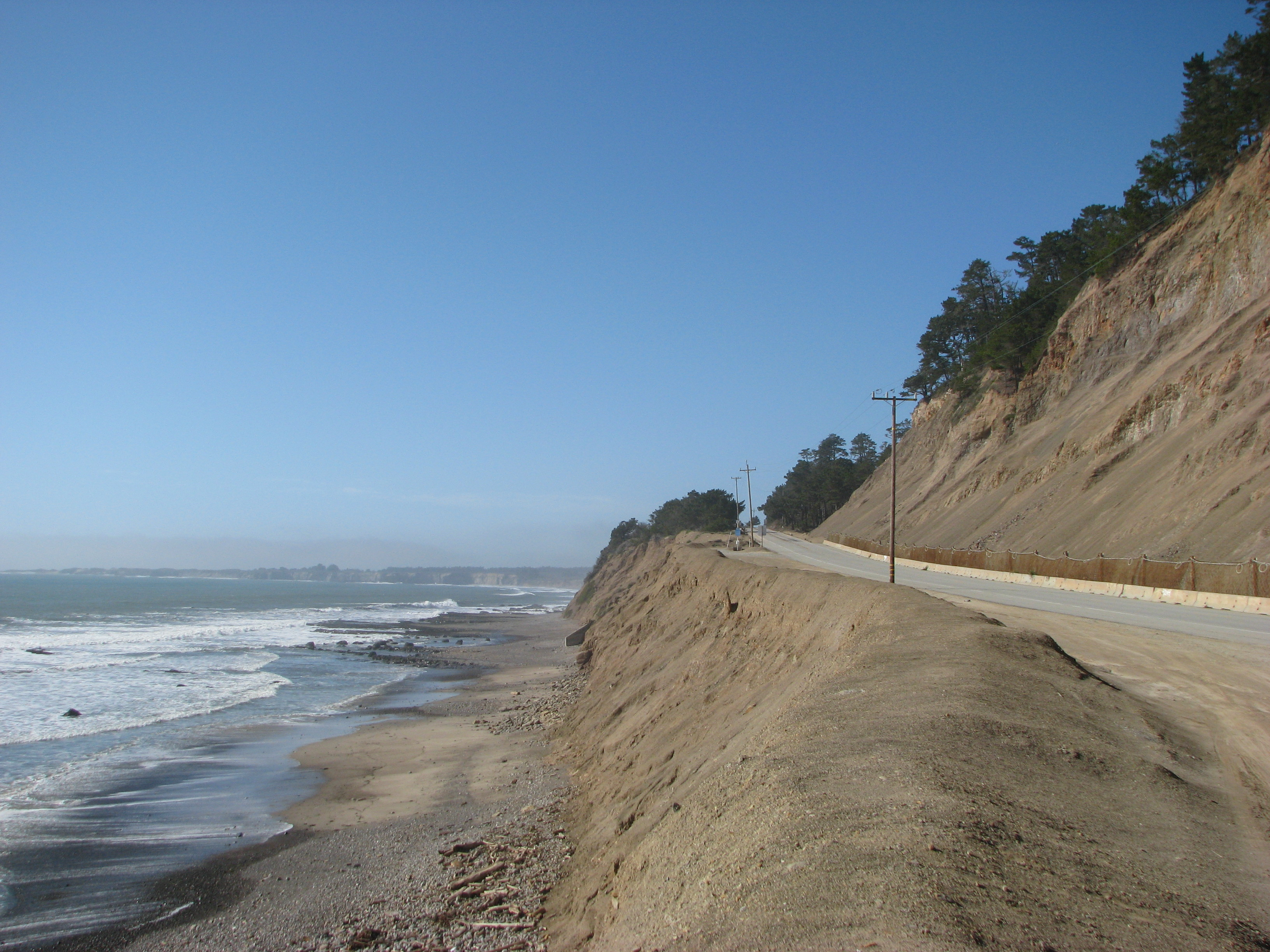
State Route 1 running right beside the Pacific Ocean somewhere near Pescadero, Pomponio and San Gregorio State Beaches

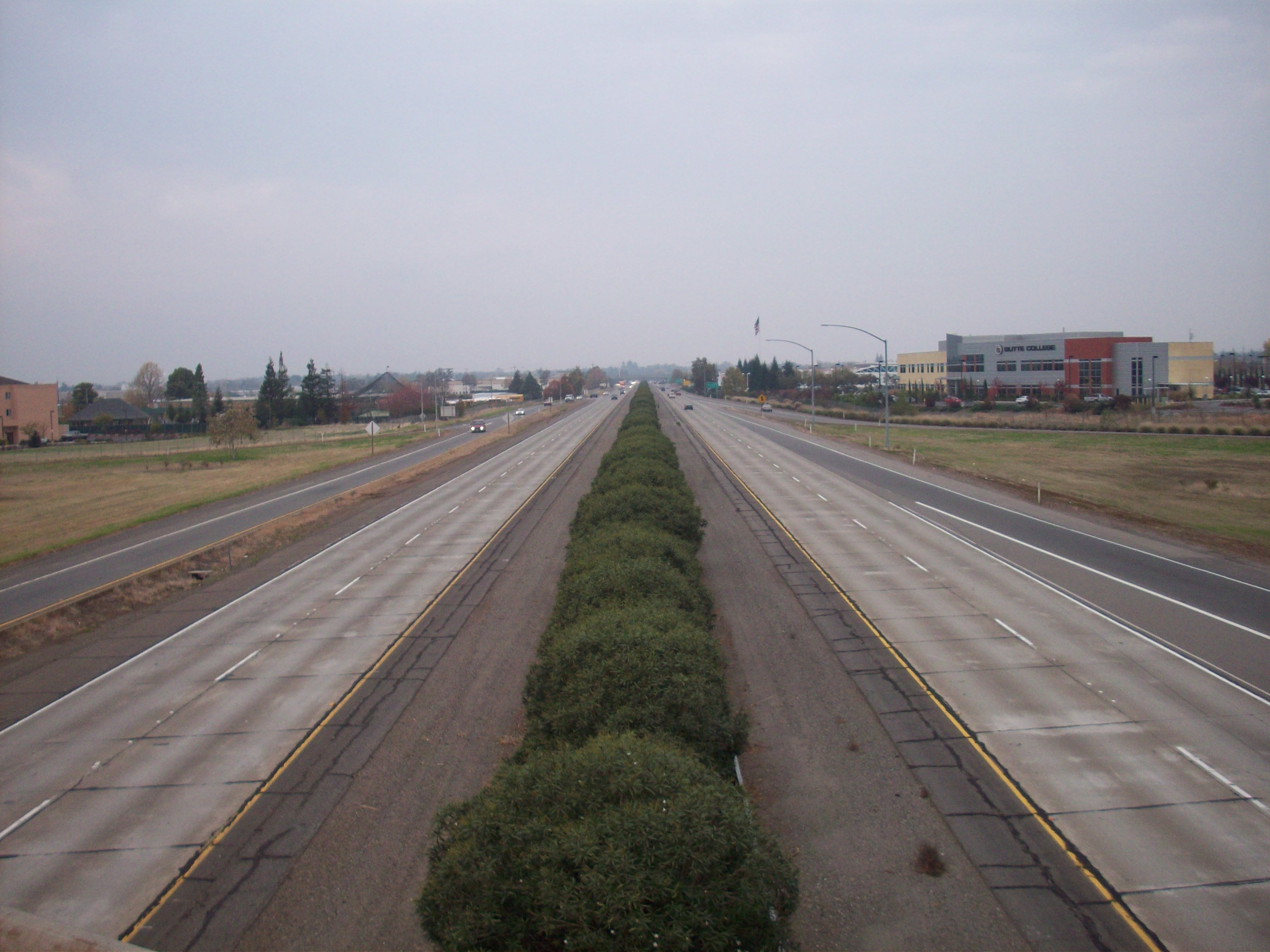
State Route 99 in Chico, facing north

State highways in California range from one-lane rural roads to full urban freeways. Each state highway is assigned a Route (officially State Highway Route) number in the Streets and Highways Code (Sections 300–635). However, the state is also currently relinquishing a number of non-freeway segments, especially in urban areas, and turning them over to local control.

The standard California state route marker consists of a white numeral on a green shield, with the name "California" displayed above the numeral. The shield is shaped like a miners' spade to honor the California Gold Rush.

Major long-distance, intercity state routes include:

| State Route 1: Runs along most of the Pacific coastline from Dana Point north to Leggett. It links numerous coastal settlements, beaches, parks, and other attractions in the Greater Los Angeles Area, the Central Coast, the San Francisco Bay Area, and the North Coast. |
| State Route 41: Runs northeast, connecting the Central Coast with the central San Joaquin Valley, Fresno, and Yosemite National Park. |
| State Route 46: Heads east from the Central Coast to the southern San Joaquin Valley near the vicinity of Bakersfield. |
| State Route 49: Known as the Gold Country Highway, SR 49 links many historic mining communities of the California Gold Rush. |
| State Route 58: Although the western segment of SR 58 is a winding mountain road connecting the Central Coast to the southern San Joaquin Valley, its eastern segment is a major artery linking Bakersfield with the Mojave Desert and Barstow. |
| State Route 99: Serves as a major north–south artery in the California Central Valley, linking major cities such as Bakersfield, Visalia, Fresno, Madera, Merced, Modesto, Stockton, Sacramento, Yuba City, and Chico. |
| State Route 152: Heads east from the Monterey Bay Area to the Santa Clara Valley and the Central Valley. |
| State Route 299: Runs east across the northern part of the state from the Eureka area to Redding and Alturas. |

=== County routes ===
County routes in California are controlled and maintained by the respective counties in which they reside, but are normally patrolled by the California Highway Patrol like any other state highway. Each county route is prefixed with a letter, depending on the region of the state (e.g. G2). Routes with letters A, B, and D are in the region of Northern California; letters E, G, and J are in Central California; and N, R, and S are in Southern California. County routes can range from two-lane roads to the full expressways found in Santa Clara County.

== Rail travel ==
Although known for its car culture, California also has a number of local and regional passenger rail systems, including the following:

| System | Image | Type | No. of lines | Description |
|---|---|---|---|---|
| Altamont Corridor Express | An Altamont Commuter Express train leaving Pleasanton Station | Commuter rail | 1 | The Altamont Commuter Express, also known as ACE, runs from San Jose northeast to Stockton, providing service from the Silicon Valley to Eastern Alameda County and San Joaquin County. |
| Bay Area Rapid Transit | A BART train boarding passengers at the Daly City Station | Heavy rail, hybrid rail, automated guideway transit | 6 | Bay Area Rapid Transit (BART) operates in the San Francisco Bay Area, connecting San Francisco with cities in the East Bay and suburbs in northern San Mateo County. |
| Caltrain | Caltrain KISS EMU | Commuter rail | 1 | Caltrain runs from San Francisco south down the San Francisco Peninsula to the Silicon Valley and has a further extension south to Gilroy, California. The route from San Francisco to San Jose is fully electrified. |
| COASTER | A COASTER train at Encinitas Station | Commuter rail | 1 | The San Diego Coast Express Rail (COASTER) operates in the central and northern coastal regions of San Diego County, running from San Diego north to Oceanside. |
| Los Angeles Metro Rail | A Metro Rail train arriving at Los Angeles Union Station | Heavy and light rail | 6 | Metro Rail is an integrated subway and light rail system serving Los Angeles County. |
| Metrolink | Metrolink's new Hyundai Rotem Cab Car at Virginia Colony in the City of Moorpark | Commuter rail, hybrid rail | 8 | Metrolink serves Los Angeles and the surrounding area of Southern California, connecting Los Angeles, San Diego, Orange, Riverside, San Bernardino and Ventura Counties. |
| Muni Metro | A Muni Metro train crossing over San Francisco's Islais Creek Channel | Light rail | 7 | Muni Metro is a premetro/light rail system connecting various neighborhoods and districts of San Francisco. |
| SacRT light rail | A SacRT light rail train in Downtown Sacramento | Light rail | 3 | The Sacramento Regional Transit District (RT) light rail system serves Sacramento and vicinity. |
| San Diego Trolley | A San Diego Trolley train approaching El Cajon Transit Center | Light rail | 5 | The San Diego Trolley serves the metropolitan area of San Diego. It runs from La Jolla in the north to San Ysidro in the south, and from Old Town and downtown San Diego in the west to El Cajon and Santee in the east. |
| San Francisco cable car system | A San Francisco cable car heading south on Powell Street | Streetcar | 3 | The world's last manually operated cable car system continues to operate in northeast San Francisco on its very steep hills, but the system's small service area and premium fares for single rides currently make the cable cars used more as a tourist attraction. |
| Sonoma–Marin Area Rail Transit | A SMART train at the Downtown Santa Rosa station | Commuter rail | 1 | Sonoma–Marin Area Rail Transit (SMART) runs through Sonoma and Marin counties. |
| SPRINTER | A SPRINTER train | Hybrid rail | 1 | The SPRINTER operates in north region of San Diego County, running from Oceanside east to Escondido. |
| VTA light rail | A VTA light rail train at Tasman station | Light rail | 3 | The Santa Clara Valley Transportation Authority (VTA) light rail system serves San Jose and its suburbs in the Silicon Valley. |

=== Amtrak ===
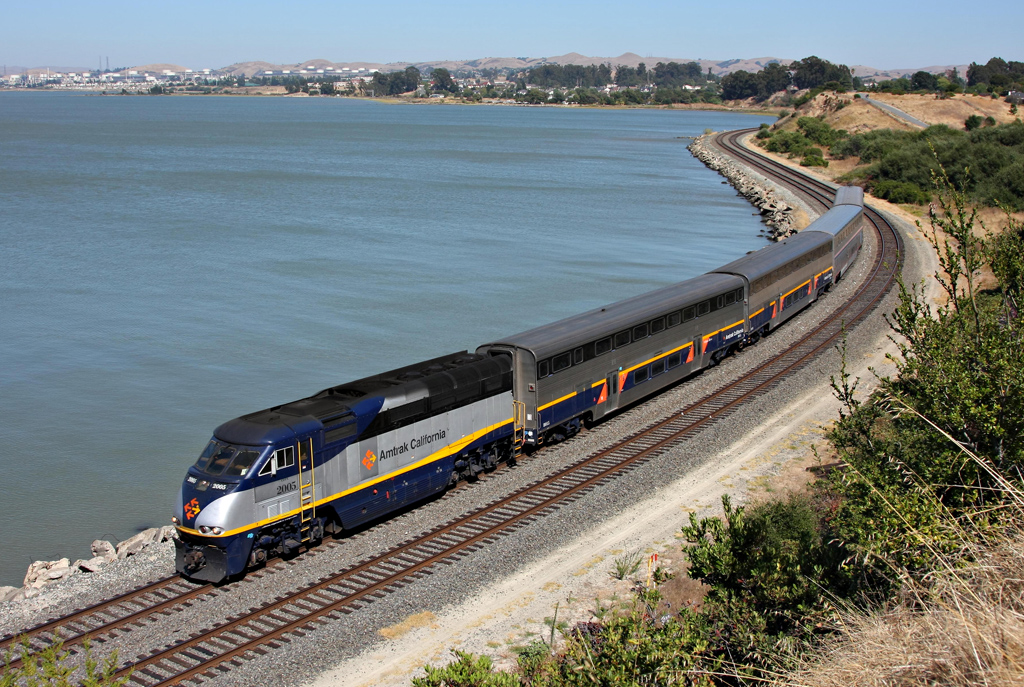
Amtrak California train in Pinole

Amtrak California is a collection of services supported by Amtrak and the California Department of Transportation. The three busiest intercity rail lines in the US outside the Northeast Corridor operate under this branding: the Capitol Corridor connects the San Francisco Bay Area to Sacramento; the Pacific Surfliner runs along the coast of Southern California from San Diego to San Luis Obispo; and the Gold Runner connects the major cities of the San Joaquin Valley with onward service to either the Bay Area or Sacramento.

National Amtrak lines include the California Zephyr from Emeryville to Chicago, Illinois; the Coast Starlight from Los Angeles to Seattle, Washington; the Southwest Chief and the Texas Eagle from Los Angeles to Chicago; and the Sunset Limited from Los Angeles to New Orleans, Louisiana.

== Bus travel ==
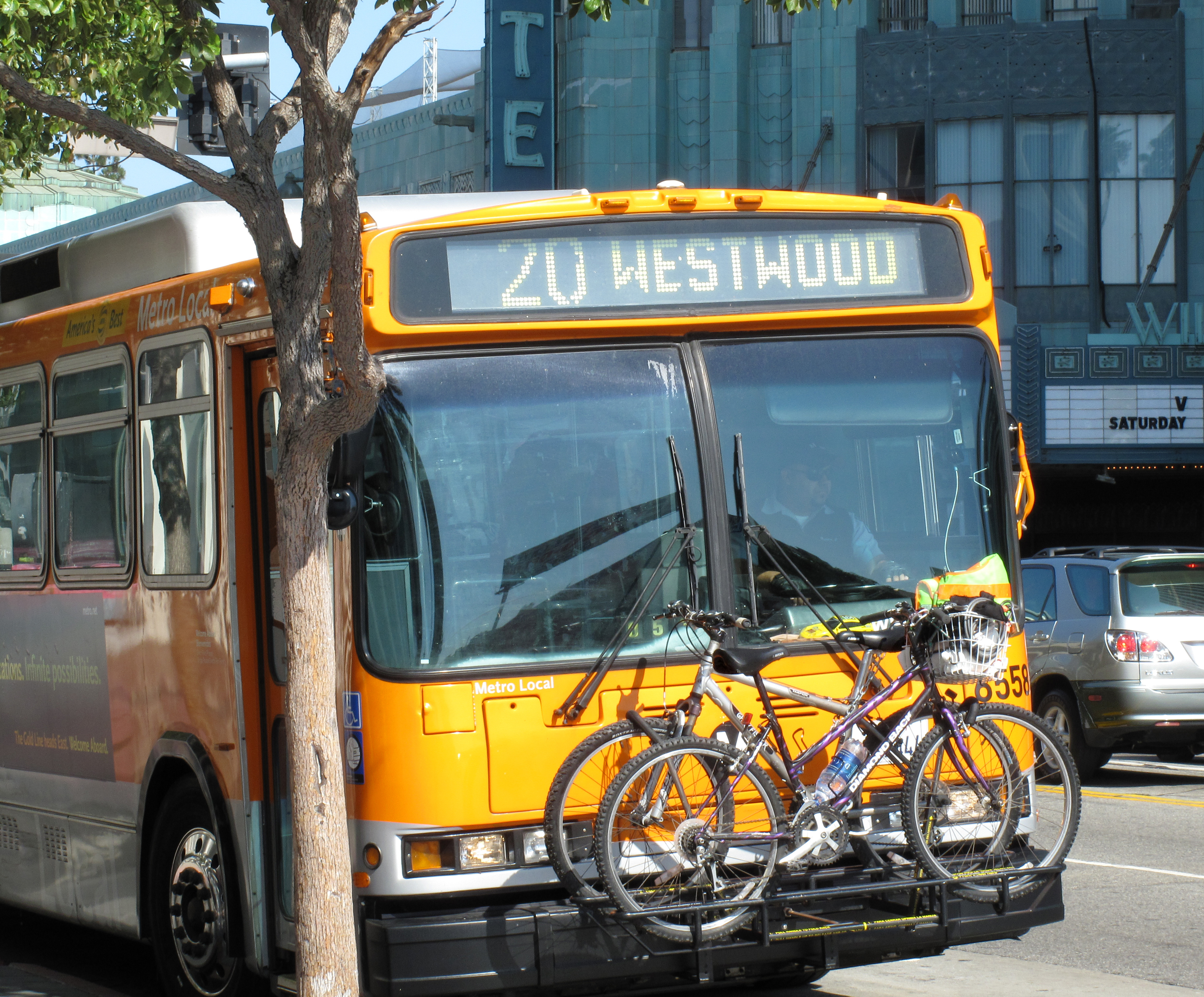
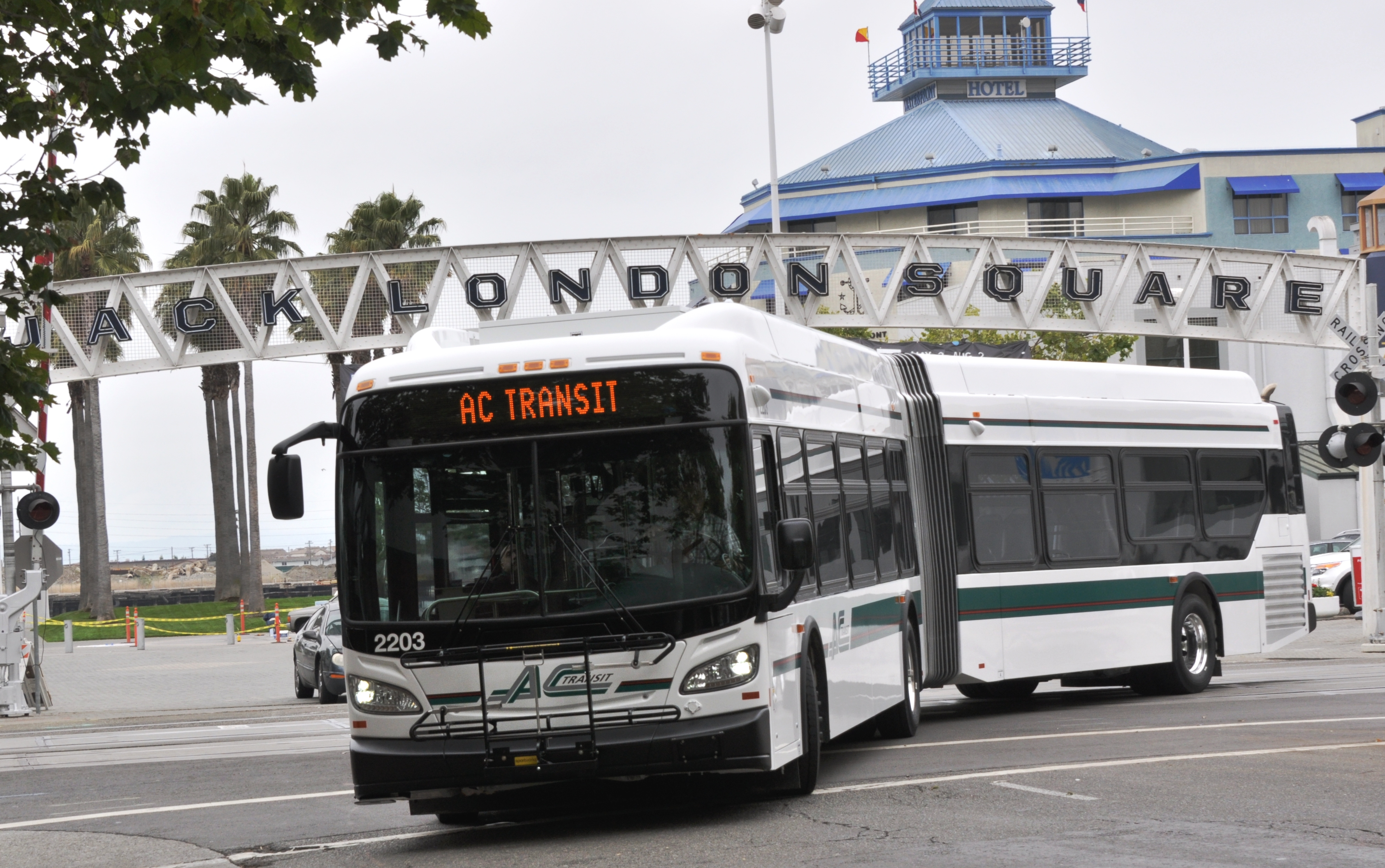
A Los Angeles Metro bus (l) and an AC Transit bus (r)

Local transit service is found in every county, from Los Angeles County, the state's most-populous one, to Alpine County, the least-populous one. Some local bus transit agencies like the San Francisco Muni and the Orange County Transportation Authority primarily only serve a specific city or county, while other agencies like AC Transit in the San Francisco Bay Area and the San Diego Metropolitan Transit System serve a specific region regardless of city or county borders.

Intercity bus travel is provided by Greyhound, Megabus and Amtrak Thruway.

Major transit hubs that serve multiple bus and rail systems include Los Angeles Union Station, San Diego Santa Fe Depot, San Jose Diridon station, and Sacramento Valley Station.

== Bicycle travel ==
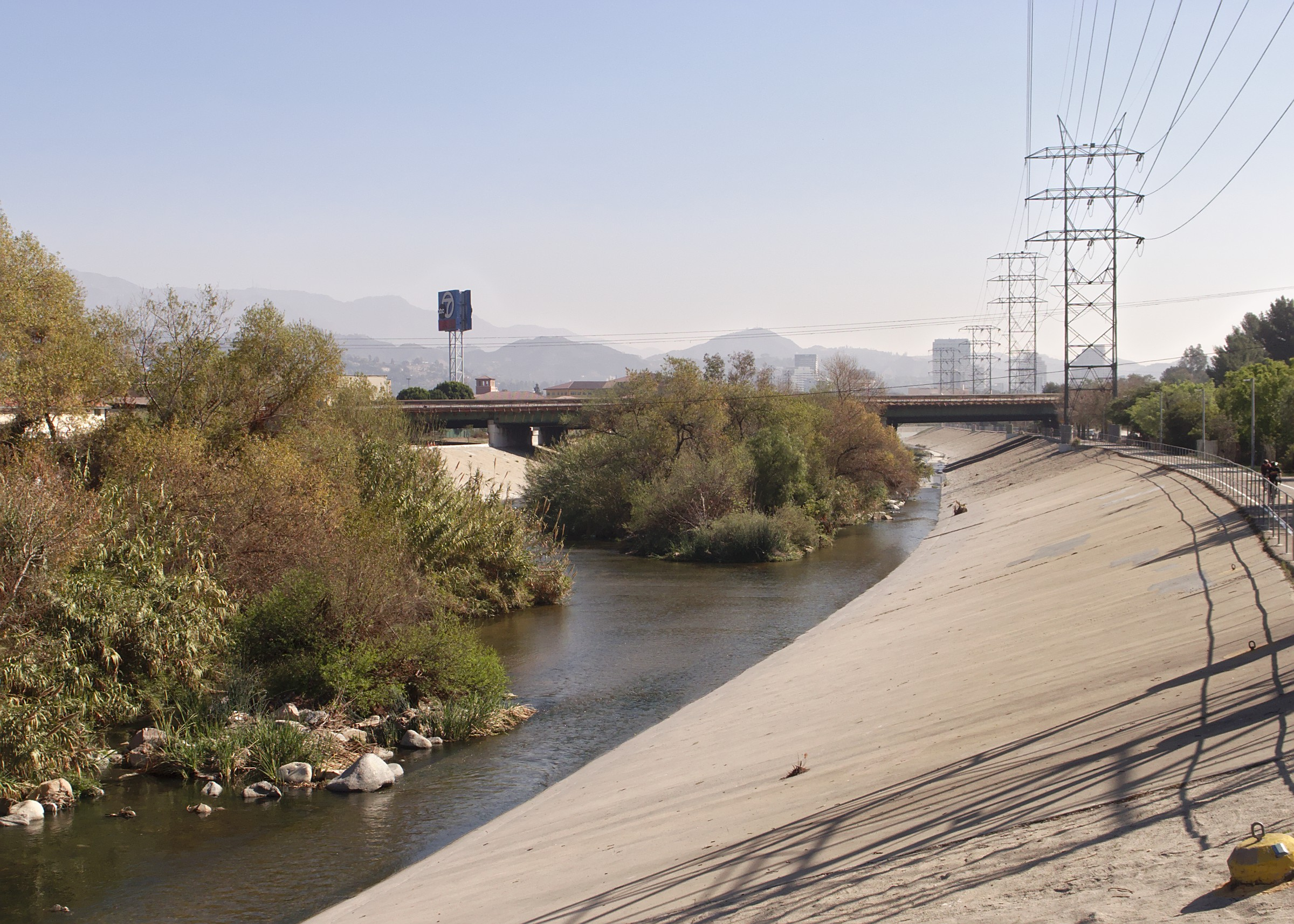
L.A. River bike path (far right) at the Glendale Narrows

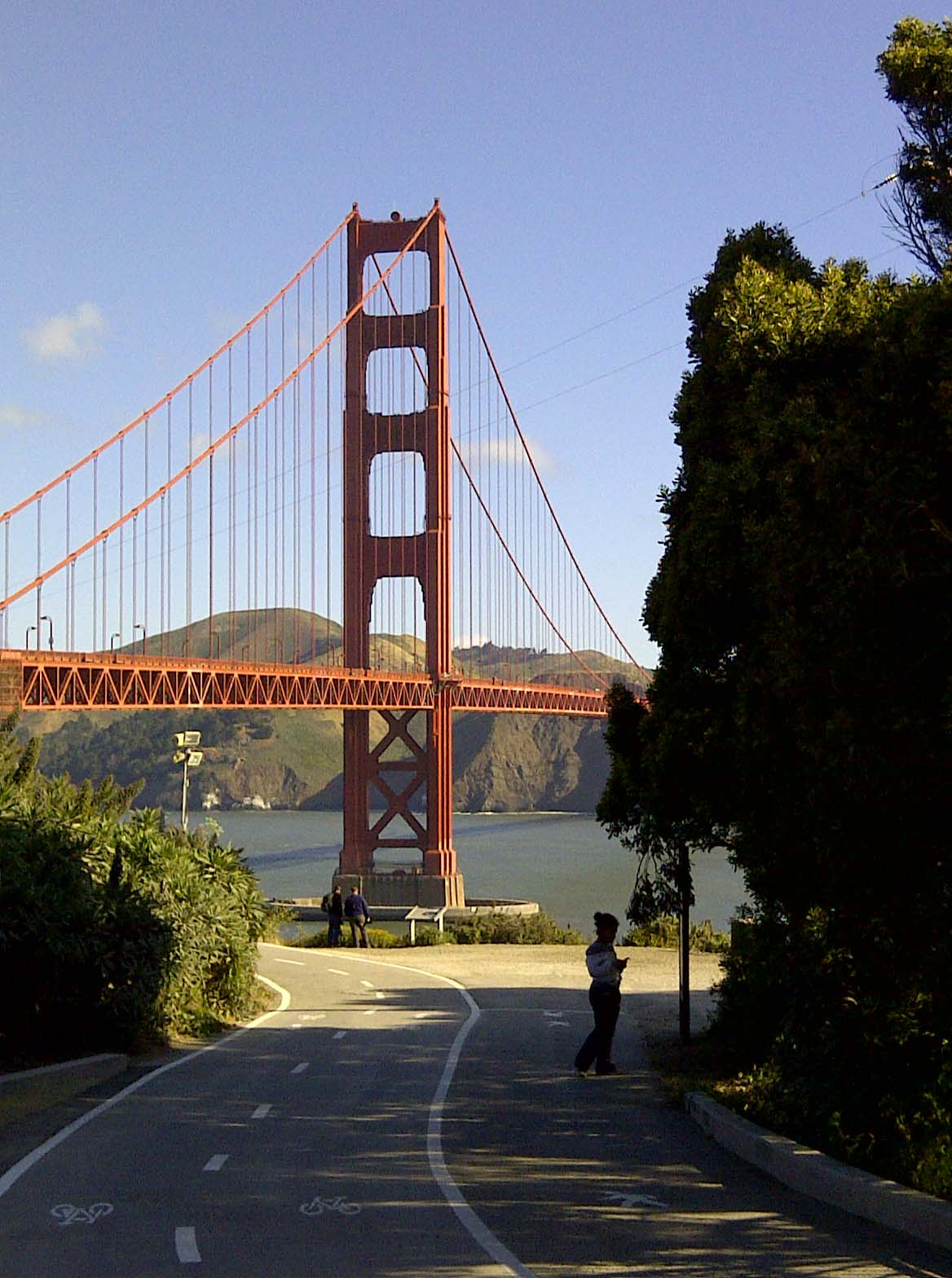
The S.F. Bay Trail near the Golden Gate Bridge

There are numerous bike routes in California such as the Los Angeles River bicycle path in the Greater Los Angeles Area and the San Francisco Bay Trail in the San Francisco Bay Area. Caltrans uses three classes to segregate cycle facilities:

- Class I: Bike path - completely segregated from traffic
- Class II: Bike lane - a lane set aside in city streets exclusively for bikes
- Class III: Bike route - a regular surface street that is designated as being safe or attractive to bicyclists

Many of the state's local public transportation systems are bicycle accessible. Numerous buses are equipped with bicycle racks at the front of the vehicle for the attachment of approximately two bicycles. Several rail systems such as the Metro Rail and BART also allow riders to carry bikes onto the trains during certain hours of the day.

== Air travel ==
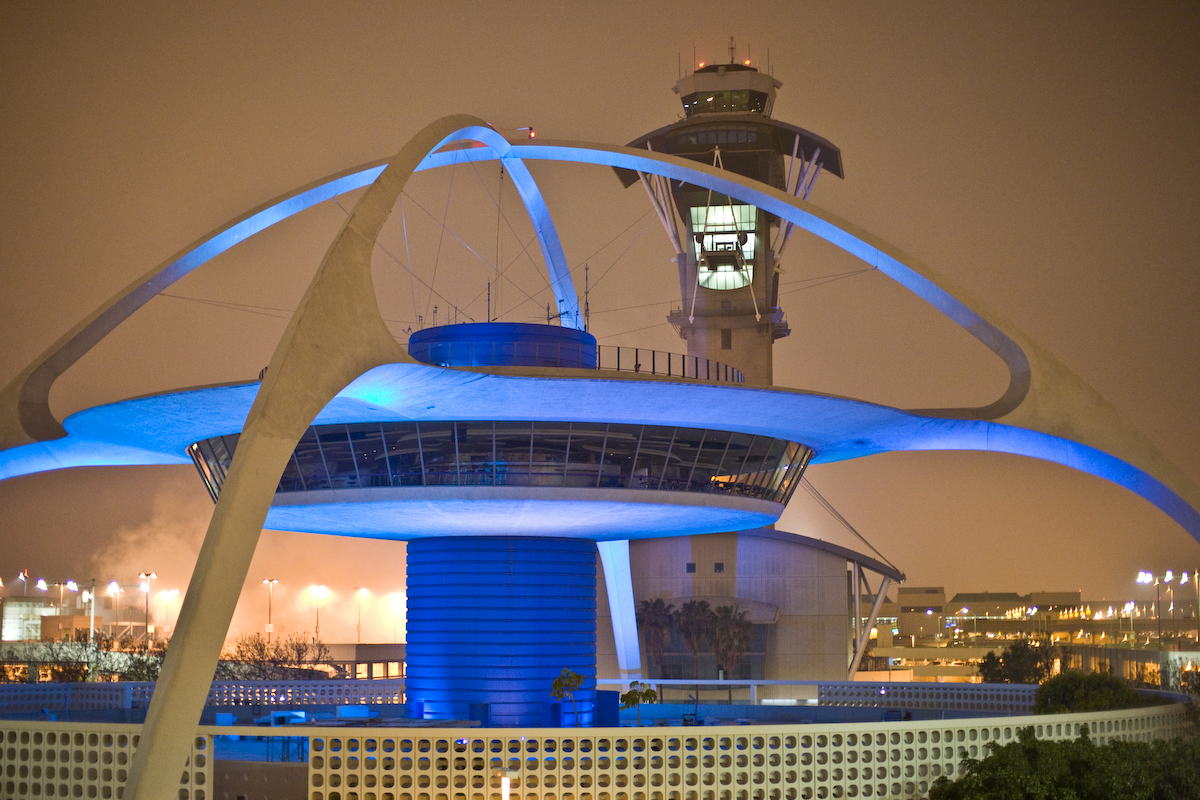
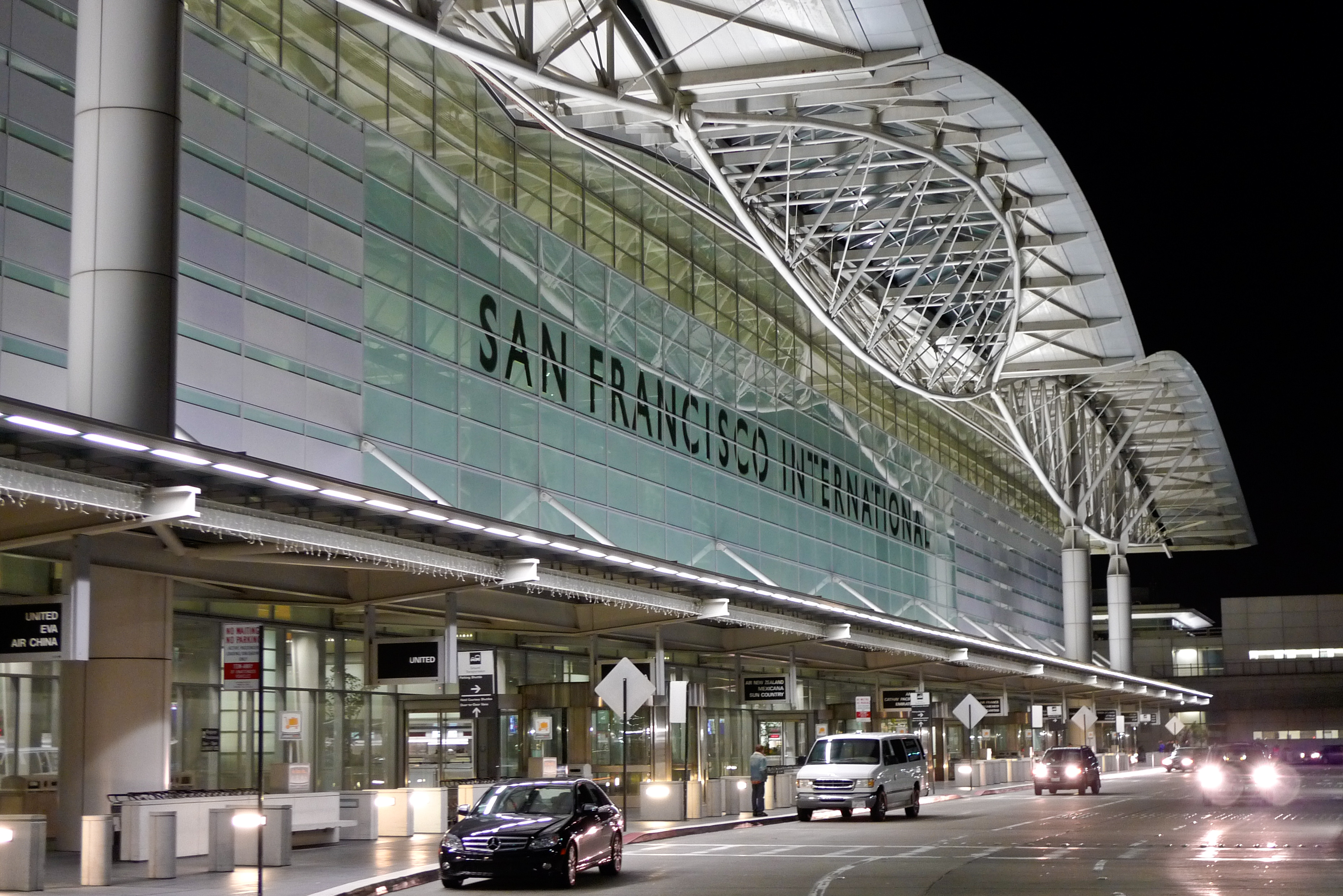
The airports of Los Angeles (l) and San Francisco (r) are two of the major air hubs in the United States

Los Angeles International Airport (LAX) and San Francisco International Airport (SFO) are major hubs for both international and transcontinental traffic. In 2011, LAX and SFO were the sixth and 22nd busiest airports in the world by passenger count, respectively.

San Diego, Sacramento, San Jose, John Wayne/Orange County, and Oakland are also among the 50 busiest airports in the United States. In total, there are about a dozen important commercial airports and many more general aviation airports throughout the state's 58 counties.

The following table shows all California airports designated by the FAA as a hub with enplanements for 2022:

| Area served | IATA | Airport name | Airport type | Enpl. |
|---|---|---|---|---|
| Los Angeles | LAX | Los Angeles International Airport | Large hub | 32,326,616 |
| San Francisco | SFO | San Francisco International Airport | Large hub | 20,411,420 |
| San Diego | SAN | San Diego International Airport | Large hub | 11,162,224 |
| Sacramento | SMF | Sacramento International Airport | Medium hub | 6,040,824 |
| San Jose | SJC | San Jose International Airport | Medium hub | 5,590,137 |
| Orange County | SNA | John Wayne Airport | Medium hub | 5,536,313 |
| Oakland | OAK | Oakland International Airport | Medium hub | 5,506,232 |
| Burbank | BUR | Hollywood-Burbank Airport | Medium hub | 3,054,729 |
| Ontario | ONT | Ontario International Airport | Medium hub | 2,840,758 |
| Long Beach | LGB | Long Beach Airport | Small hub | 1,600,987 |
| Palm Springs | PSP | Palm Springs International Airport | Small hub | 1,499.987 |
| Fresno | FAT | Fresno Yosemite International Airport | Small hub | 1,077,710 |
| Santa Barbara | SBA | Santa Barbara Municipal Airport | Small hub | 610,916 |

== Seaports and harbors ==
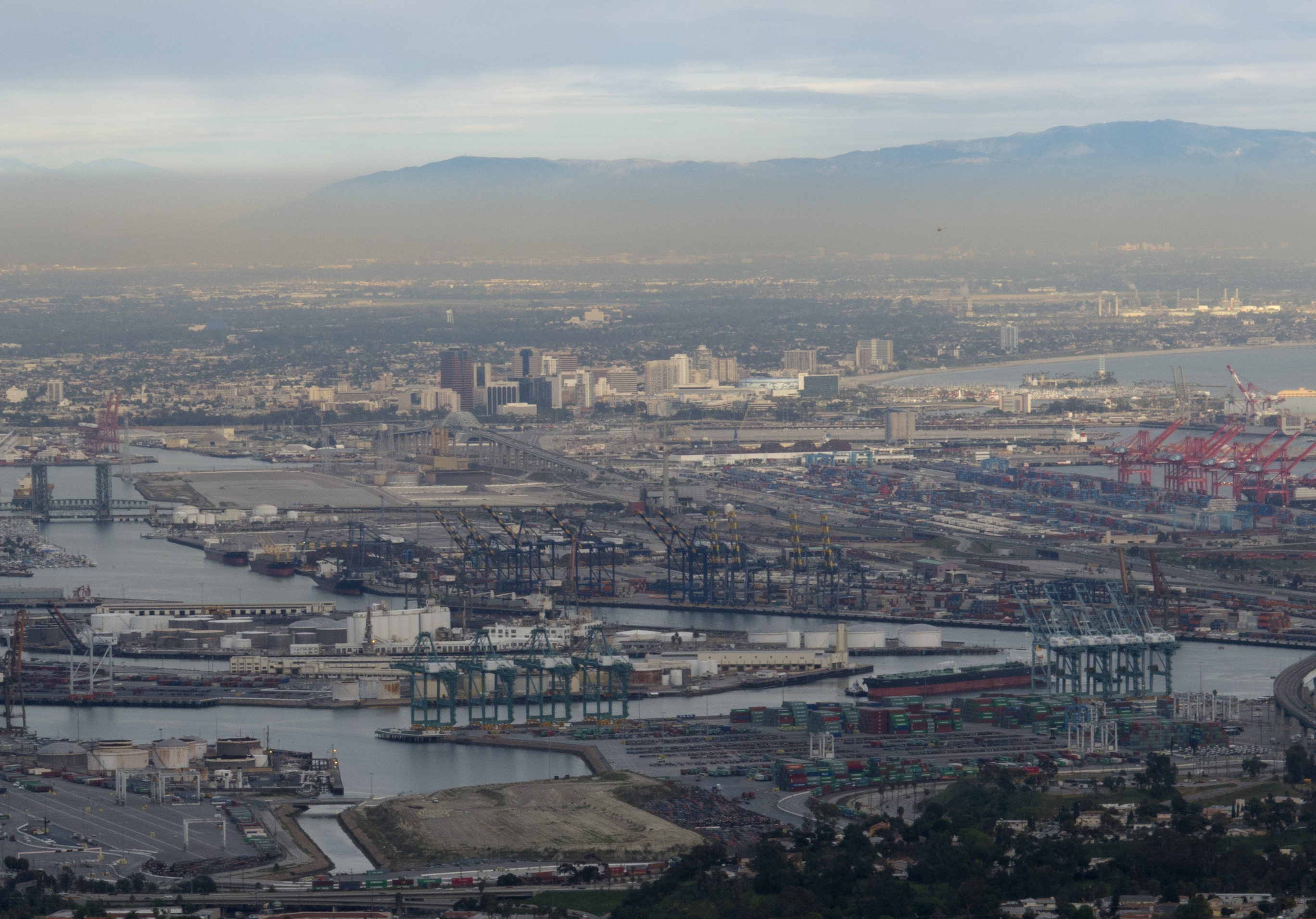
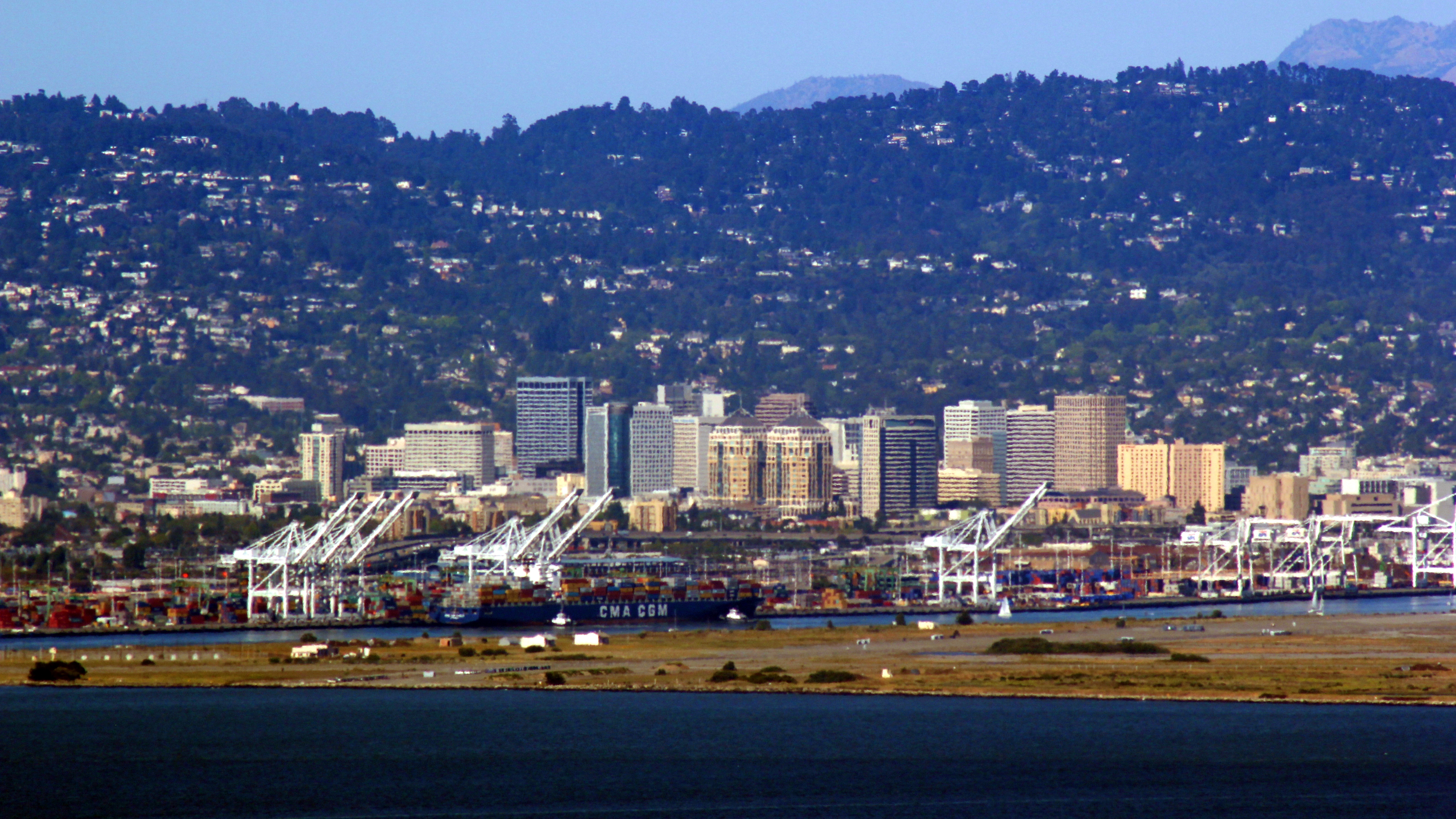
The port complex of Los Angeles and Long Beach (l) and the Port of Oakland (r) are two of the major sea hubs in California

California also has several important seaports. The giant seaport complex formed by the Port of Los Angeles and the Port of Long Beach in Southern California is the largest in the country and responsible for handling about a fourth of all container cargo traffic in the United States. The Port of Oakland handles most of the ocean containers passing through Northern California. The Port of Redwood City, the Port of Richmond, and the Port of San Diego are also significant ports for freight shipments. The Port of Sacramento and the Port of Stockton are two major inland deepwater ports located in the Central Valley, and thus only accessible via the Sacramento–San Joaquin River Delta. Instead of dredging the Sacramento River, the Sacramento Deep Water Ship Channel was built in 1963 to accommodate large ships traveling from the delta to Sacramento.

A number of passenger ferry services take commuters across San Francisco Bay from San Francisco to other communities in the Bay Area. Ferry service is also available for commuters crossing San Diego Bay from San Diego to Coronado. Passenger ferries also serve the offshore city of Avalon on Santa Catalina Island. There is no regular vehicle ferry service to Avalon, however, since the city restricts the use of cars and trucks within its borders. Caltrans only operates two vehicle ferries in the Sacramento–San Joaquin River Delta, the Howard Landing Ferry and the Ryer Island Ferry.

Numerous local harbors are spread out across the Pacific Coast, San Francisco Bay, San Diego Bay, and the Sacramento – San Joaquin River Delta for commercial fishing or recreational use.

== Current issues ==
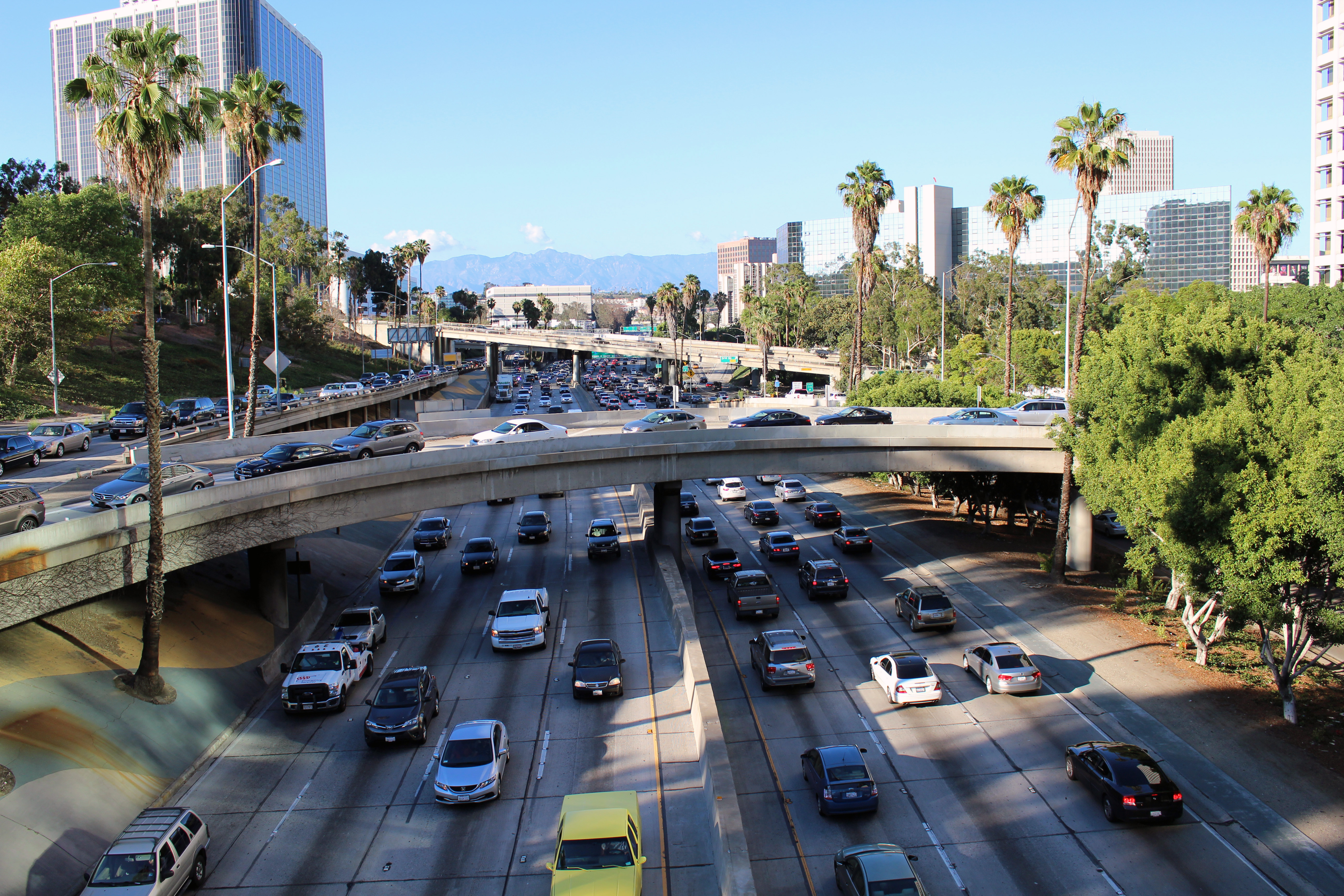
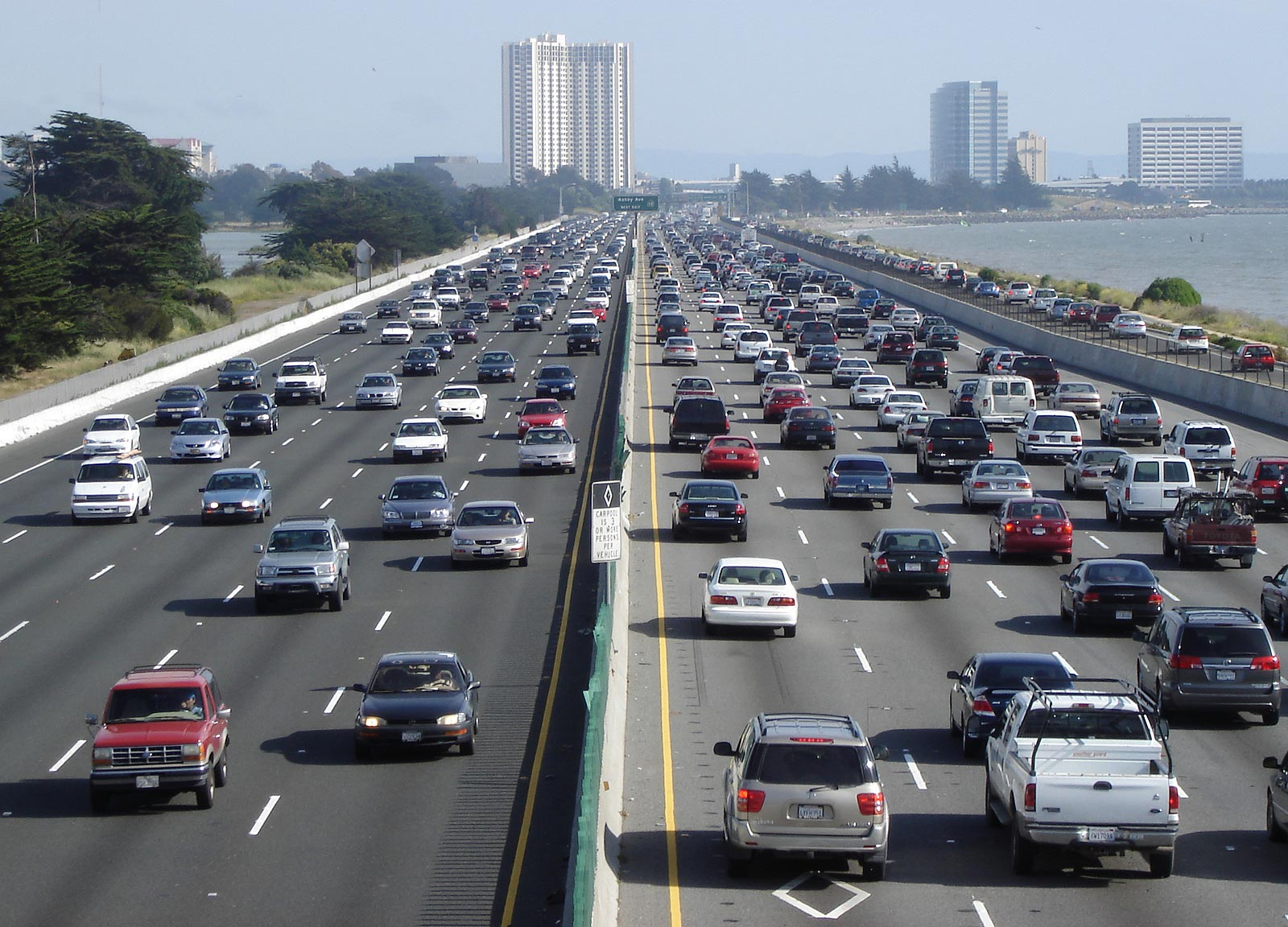
Traffic on the Harbor Freeway in Los Angeles (l) and the Eastshore Freeway in Berkeley (r). Traffic congestion is a regular occurrence along California's freeways

Because of the state's population growth, many settlements that were once small or rural communities in the 1940s and 50s, when much of California's transportation infrastructure was originally designed, are now thriving suburbs and exurbs. According to a 2011 study by Forbes, the cities of Lake Elsinore, Los Banos, Adelanto, and Brentwood were ranked as the top four longest commutes in the country.

A regularly recurring issue in California politics is whether the state should continue to aggressively expand its freeway network or concentrate on improving mass transit networks in urban areas. Bay Area Rapid Transit, the Los Angeles Metro Rail, and several other public transportation systems have expansion plans either currently under construction or in the planning stages. Several HOT lanes across the state are also either currently under construction or in the planning stages.

Reloadable contactless smart card systems, allowing electronic fare payments on various public transportation systems, have been introduced since 2007, such as the Clipper card in the San Francisco Bay Area, the TAP card in Los Angeles County, and the Compass Card (later replaced in 2021 by the Pronto card) in San Diego County.

The California High-Speed Rail Authority was created in 1996 by the state legislature to implement an extensive 800 miles (1,300 km) high-speed rail system. It would provide a TGV-style high-speed link between the state's four major metropolitan areas, and would allow travel between Los Angeles' Union Station and the San Francisco Transbay Terminal in two hours and forty minutes. Voters approved Proposition 1A in November 2008, approving a $9 billion state bond to begin the project. In 2012, the California legislature and Governor Jerry Brown approved construction financing for an initial stage of the project. The Authority estimates that the first segment of the California High-Speed Rail will be operational by the end of 2030. The project has been widely described as troubled, being far behind schedule, suffering from management inexperience, and delays in procuring land, and engineering issues.

=== Traffic safety considerations ===
Texas and California are comparable being the two largest states in the contiguous United States as California contains 39 million inhabitants. This results in these states to have higher traffic fatalities than other states.

There were more traffic fatalities in California than in Texas until 2007. Since 2017, there have been less fatalities in California than in Texas.

| Fatalities in California | Fatalities in California by zone |
|---|---|
| Fatalities comparison. View chart definition. | Fatalities in urban and rural zone. View chart definition. |
| by VMT | by population |
| Rate by 10^{8} VMT. View chart definition. | Rate by 10^{5} people. View chart definition. |
Sources: https://cdan.nhtsa.gov/SASStoredProcess/guest (Eurostat/CARE for comparison to France and Germany); California traffic-fatalities 2010–2019: https://seriousaccidents.com/blog/california-traffic-fatalities-data/

=== California Housing Crisis and Climate Change ===
In California, around 40% of the state's greenhouse gas emissions are from vehicle transportation, and this number is increasing. Distant suburbs such as Stockton, and Modesto have the two highest percentages of residents who are super commuters in the United States, at around 11% of Stockton residents, and 9% of Modesto residents commuting over 90 minutes to get to work. The transportation problem is beginning to threaten the state's future goals in terms of emissions and carbon neutrality. By 2030, California hopes to limit greenhouse gases to 40% below 1990 levels, and hopes to achieve carbon neutrality by 2045. As time goes on, however, these goals are becoming increasingly difficult to reach unless the state takes significant measures to combat their transportation problem. With 1.7 million renting households in California spending half their income on rent, California has a housing crisis that is impacting their climate goals. Infill housing is seen as a solution to build more affordable housing in coastal cities where people would not need to drive to work or other errands. Senate Bill 50, The More Homes Act is waiting to be voted on, and attempts to address the housing crisis by overriding local zoning codes to legalize small apartment buildings (up to 5 stories) in urban areas near jobs and public transportation. Caltrans plans to work on their infrastructure to make sustainable transportation methods such as trains, biking, and walking more accessible to more people. In 2008, California passed a law requiring communities to alter their land use and transportation plans to actively combat climate change, however, statistically the bill has done little to change the state's emissions. Caltrans has acknowledged that extreme wildfires and floods, driven by climate change, have plagued California in recent years which has impacted transportation infrastructure. In 2013 Caltrans released the "Caltrans Activities to Address Climate Change- Reducing Greenhouse Gas Emissions and Adapting to Impacts" report, which highlighted statewide efforts to address climate related damage.

== See also ==
- Plug-in electric vehicles in California
- Sig Alert
- Vehicle registration plates of California

Transportation history

- Highway system
- Maritime
- Rail transportation

Transportation by region

- Transportation in Kern County
- Transportation in Greater Los Angeles
  - Transportation in Los Angeles
  - Transportation in the Inland Empire
- Transportation in the Sacramento metropolitan area
- Transportation in San Diego County
- Transportation in the San Francisco Bay Area
