= Real McCoy II =

History
- Name: Real McCoy II
- Operator: California Department of Transportation
- Route: SR 84 (Ryer Island Ferry)
- Launched: 2011
- Identification: MMSI number: 367471940; Callsign: WDF6221

General characteristics
- Type: ferryboat
- Length: 88 ft (27 m)
- Beam: 38 ft (12 m)
- Capacity: 80,000 lb (36,000 kg) / eight vehicles

Real McCoy II is a ferryboat that has operated since 2011 from Rio Vista, California on the Ryer Island Ferry route as part of California State Route 84, operated by the California Department of Transportation. It replaced the original Real McCoy in 2011. It operates 24 hours per day, 7 days per week, three trips per hour, over the 800-foot (240 m) gap in California State Route 84 in the Sacramento River delta, between Ryer Island and Rio Vista. Real McCoy II is 88 ft (27 m) long by 38 ft (12 m) wide, has a capacity of 80,000 pounds (36,000 kg), and can carry up to ten vehicles. There is a 16.25-ton weight limit, tractor-trailers are prohibited, and the length limit is at the discretion of the United States Coast Guard.
