= Real McCoy (ferry) =

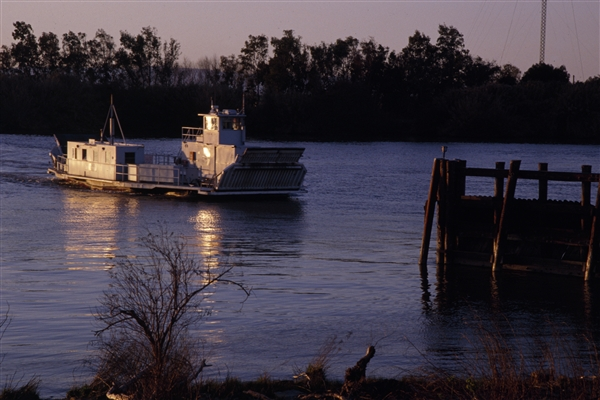

History
- Name: Real McCoy
- Operator: California Department of Transportation
- Route: SR 84 (Ryer Island Ferry)
- In service: 1945–2011

General characteristics
- Type: ferryboat

Real McCoy was a ferryboat that operated for 63 years from Rio Vista, California on the Ryer Island Ferry route as part of California State Route 84, and was the oldest and most reliable piece of equipment owned by the California Department of Transportation. During its operating life – making the trip 24 hours per day, 7 days per week and roughly 200 trips a day – totaling approximately 460,000 safe passages over the 800-foot (240 m) gap in the Sacramento River delta, between Ryer Island and Rio Vista.

It was replaced in 2011 by Real McCoy II.
