= California State Route 220 =

Highway in California

State Route 220

- SR 220 highlighted in red

Route information
- Maintained by Caltrans
- Length: 6 mi (9.7 km)
- Restrictions: No tractor-trailers or vehicles over 15 tons on the Howard Landing Ferry. Length restrictions may also apply.

Major junctions
- West end: SR 84 near Rio Vista
- East end: SR 160 near Walnut Grove

Location
- Country: United States
- State: California
- Counties: Solano, Sacramento

Highway system
- State highways in California; Interstate; US; State; Scenic; History; Pre‑1964; Unconstructed; Deleted; Freeways
← SR 219	→ SR 221

State Route 220 (SR 220) is a state highway in the U.S. state of California, defined to run between State Route 84 and State Route 160 on Ryer Island in the Sacramento–San Joaquin River Delta. At the eastern end of Ryer Island, the road crosses Steamboat Slough on the Howard Landing Ferry, a cable ferry.

== Route description ==
Route 220 is defined in section 520 of the California Streets and Highways Code, and that the highway is "from Route 84 on Ryer Island to Route 160".

State Route 220 runs east from State Route 84 on Ryer Island in Solano County to State Route 160 in Sacramento County. The route includes the toll-free Howard Landing Ferry, where the cable-drawn vessel J-Mack takes vehicles across Steamboat Slough. Both the Howard Landing Ferry and the Ryer Island Ferry along State Route 84 are the only state-run ferries, and there are no plans to replace them with bridges due to the low traffic numbers around Ryer Island, The only road bridge connecting Ryer Island is on its north side, which results in longer commutes for residents if one or both ferries shutdown.

== Major intersections ==
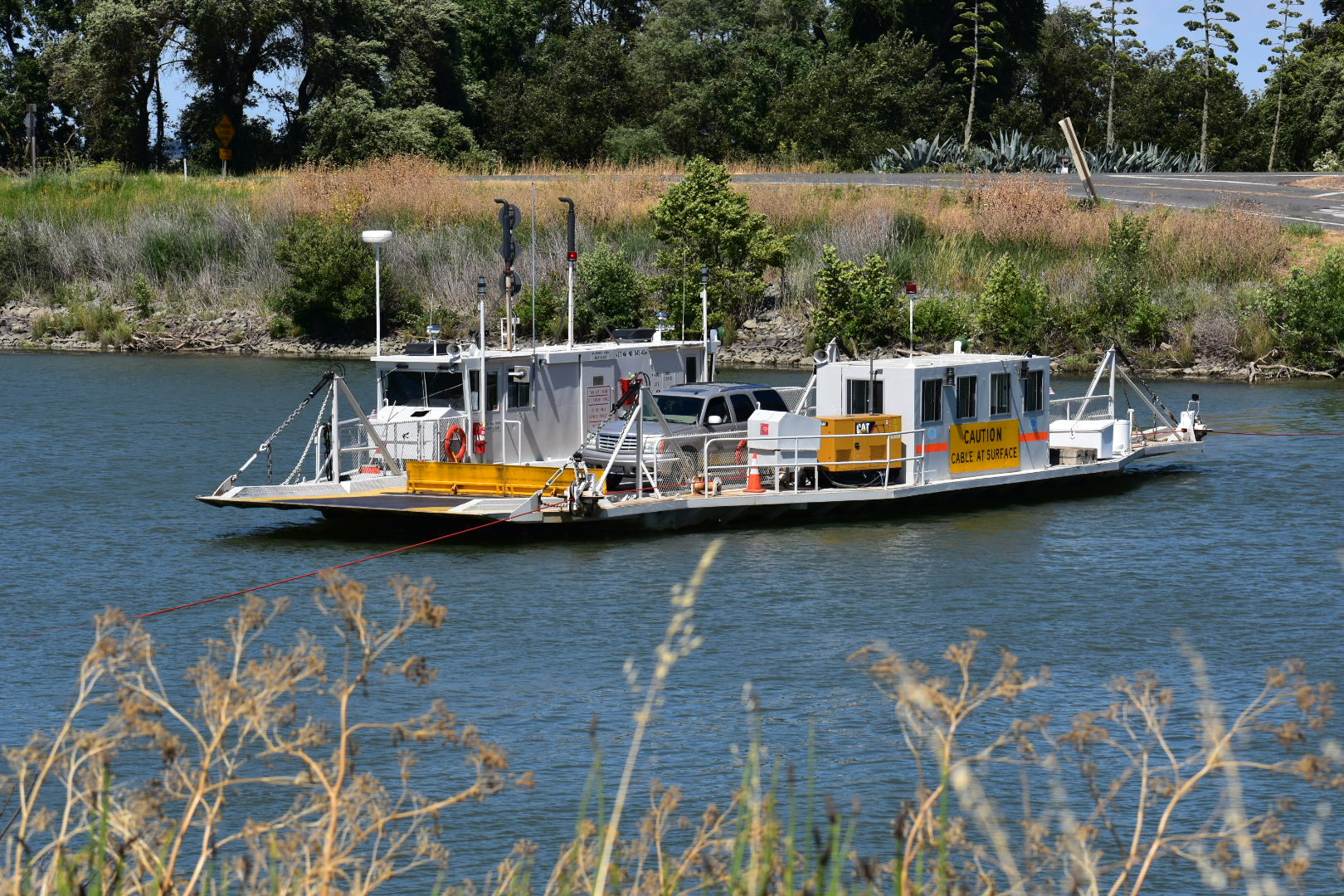
The Howard Landing Ferry takes SR 220 traffic across Steamboat Slough.

Except where prefixed with a letter, postmiles were measured on the road as it was in 1964, based on the alignment that existed at the time, and do not necessarily reflect current mileage. Postmile prefixes include: R reflecting a realignment in the route since then, M indicating a second realignment, L referring to an overlap due to a correction or change, and T indicating postmiles classified as temporary. Segments that remain unconstructed or have been relinquished to local control may be omitted. The numbers reset at county lines; the start and end postmiles in each county are given in the county column.

County	Location	Postmile	Destinations	Notes
Solano; SOL 0.00-3.20		0.00	SR 84 – Rio Vista, Sacramento	West end of SR 220
Steamboat Slough		3.20 0.00	Howard Landing Ferry	
Sacramento; SAC 0.00-3.10	Ryde	3.10	SR 160 – Walnut Grove, Isleton	East end of SR 220
1.000 mi = 1.609 km; 1.000 km = 0.621 mi
