= Ryer Island Ferry =

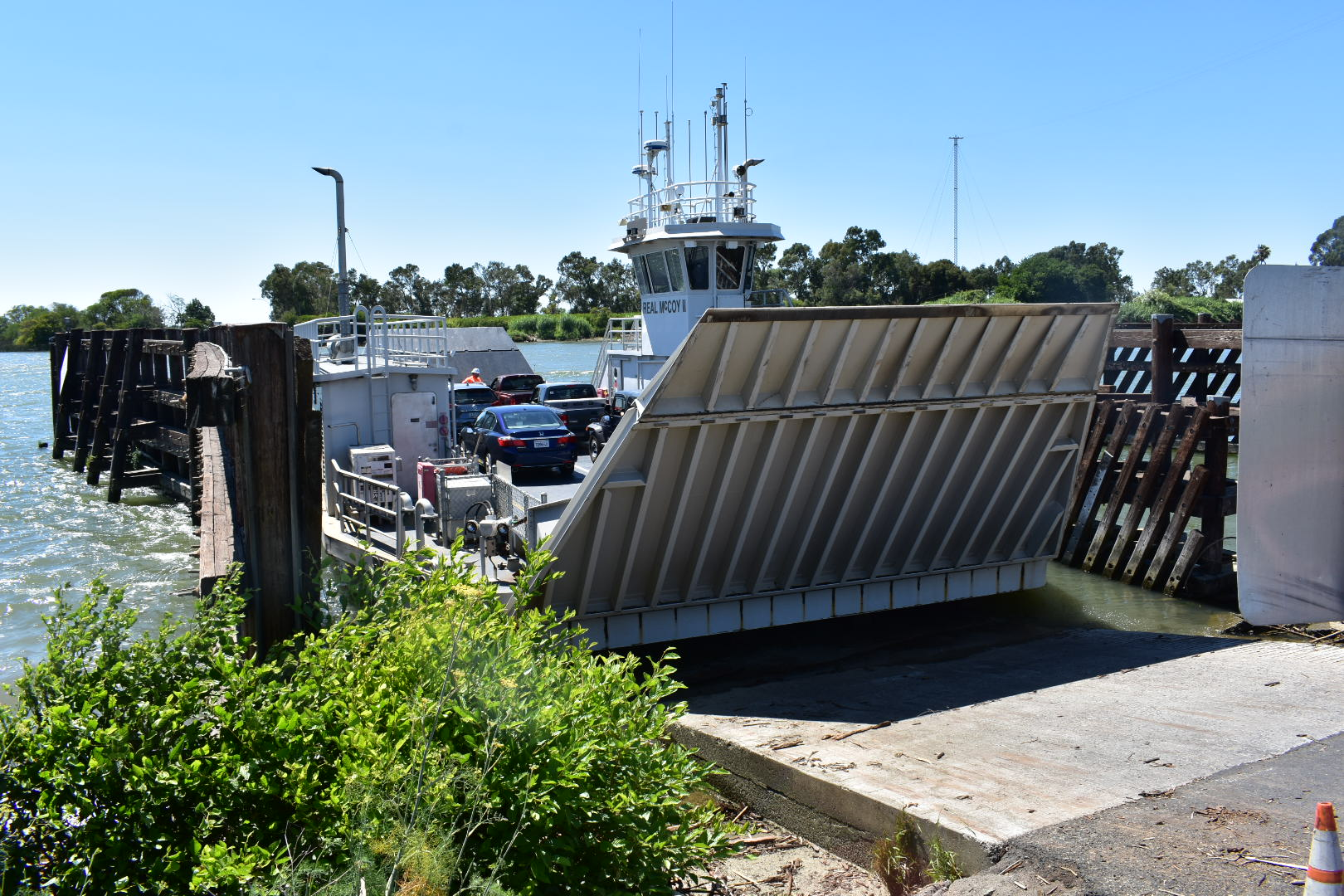
Ryer Island Ferry

The Ryer Island Ferry is a ferry that operates between Rio Vista and Ryer Island, crossing Cache Slough in the Sacramento–San Joaquin River Delta in Solano County, California. The California Department of Transportation (Caltrans) operates the vehicle roll-on/roll-off service, which is classified as part of California State Route 84. The free ferry service operates 24 hours a day, 7 days a week, leaving every 20 minutes; on the hour, 20 minutes after the hour, and 40 minutes after the hour.

The ferry is served by the vessel Real McCoy II which is 88-feet long by 38-feet wide and entered service in 2011, replacing the venerable Real McCoy. The hull's capacity is 80,000 pounds (36,000 kg), and can carry up to eight vehicles. It is powered by a hydraulic propulsion system, with 360 degree propellers for steering. There is a 16.25-ton weight limit, tractor-trailers are prohibited, and the length limit is at the discretion of the Coast Guard.

Ryer Island is also connected via the Howard Landing Ferry on Highway 220 to the east towards Ryde, and north via Highway 84 on a bridge towards West Sacramento. Both the Howard Landing Ferry and the Ryer Island Ferry are the only state-run ferries, and there are no plans to replace them with bridges due to the low traffic numbers around Ryer Island.
