= Grand Island (California) =

Island in California, United States

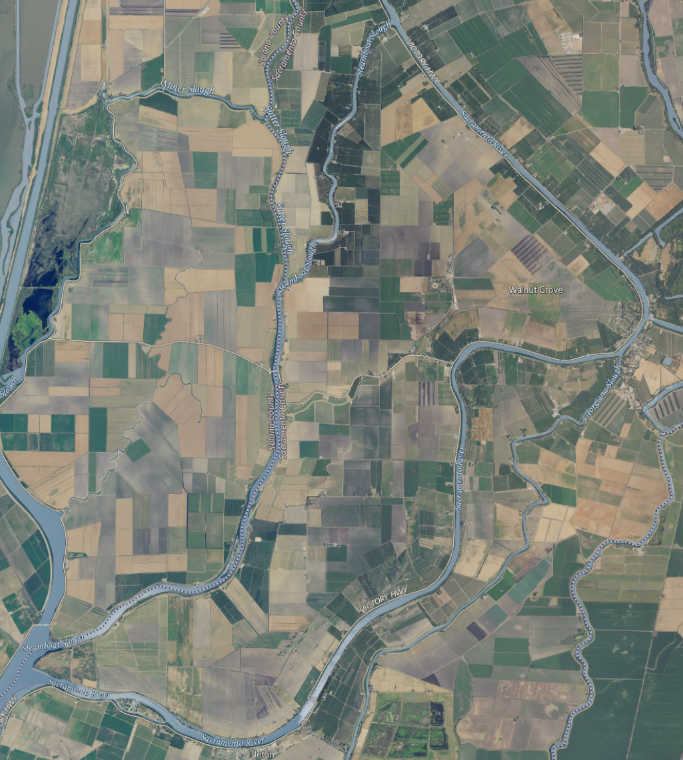
- USGS aerial imagery of the island.

- Location within Sacramento-San Joaquin River Delta Location within California Location within the United States

Geography
- Location: Northern California
- Coordinates: 38°14′08″N 121°34′45″W
- Adjacent to: Sacramento-San Joaquin River Delta

Administration
- United States
- State: California
- County: Sacramento

Grand Island (formerly referred to as Taylor Island or La Isla de los Quenensias) is an island lying between Steamboat Slough and the Sacramento River. A post office operated at Grand Island from 1854 to 1919. It is shown, labeled "Taylor Island", on an 1850 survey map of the San Francisco Bay area made by Cadwalader Ringgold and an 1854 map of the area by Henry Lange.

Grand Island is located in Sacramento County, California at 38°14′08″N 121°34′45″W, and managed by Reclamation District 3.
