= Howard Landing Ferry =

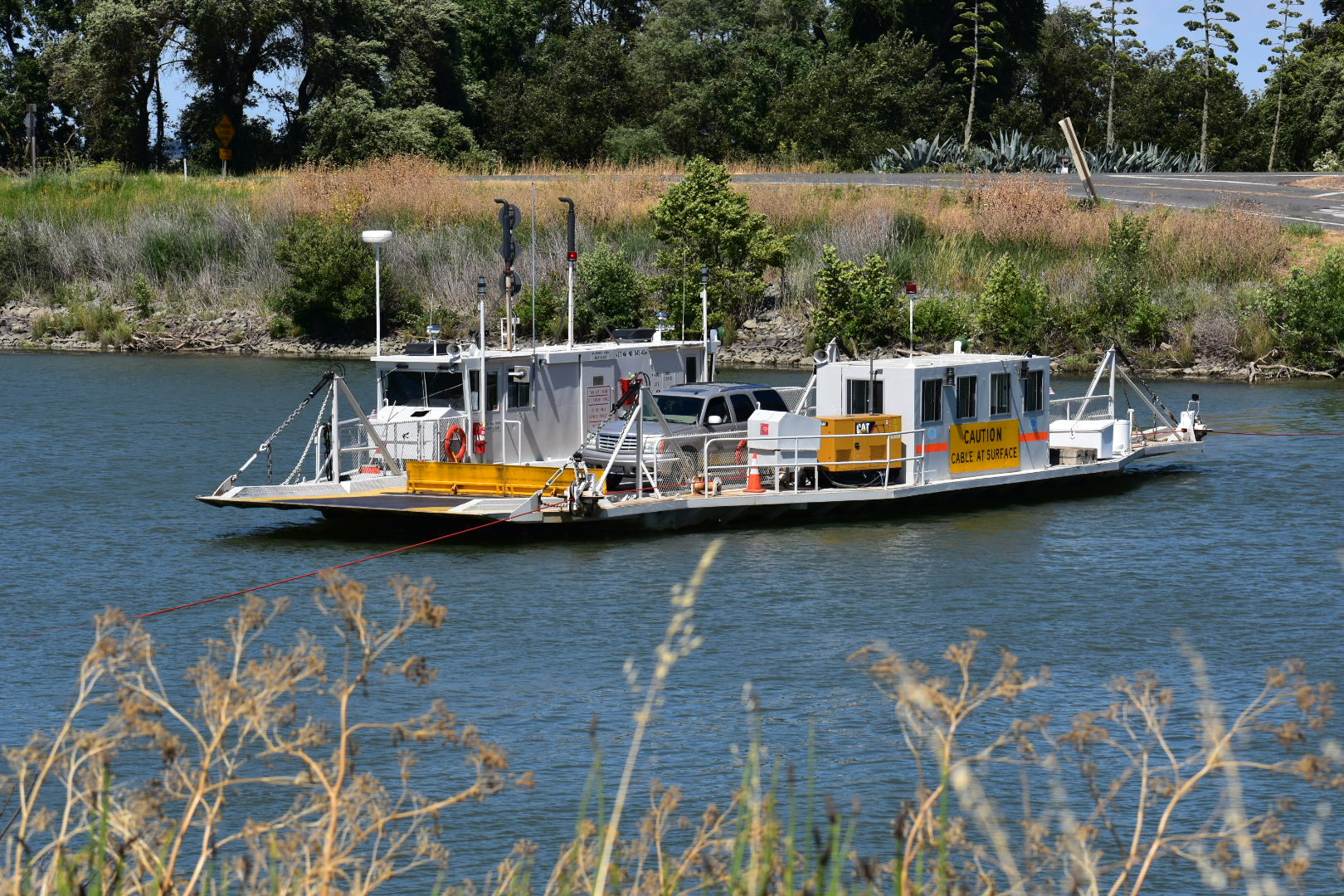
Howard Landing Ferry

The Howard Landing Ferry (also called J-Mac, J-Mack Ferry, Steamboat Slough Ferry, or Grand Island Ferry) is a cable ferry that operates between Ryde and Ryer Island, crossing Steamboat Slough in the Sacramento-San Joaquin River Delta in Solano County, California. The California Department of Transportation (Caltrans) operates the vehicle roll-on/roll-off service, which is classified as part of California State Route 220. The free ferry service operates 24 hours a day, 7 days a week. Boat operators are on duty 24 hours a day to provide service to individual passengers and motorists crossing Steamboat Slough.

The ferry is served by the vessel J-Mack (or J-Mac), a 92 ft × 32 ft (28.0 m × 9.8 m) cable drawn ferry that can carry up to six vehicles. Because Steamboat Slough is an active shipping channel, the cable normally sits about 18 feet (5.5 m) underneath the water when the ferry is docked. There is a 15-ton weight limit, tractor-trailers are prohibited, and the length limit is at the discretion of the Coast Guard.

Ryer Island is also connected via Highway 84 to the southwest via the Ryer Island Ferry towards Rio Vista, and north via a bridge towards West Sacramento. Both the Howard Landing Ferry and the Ryer Island Ferry are the only state-run ferries, and there are no plans to replace them with bridges due to the low traffic numbers around Ryer Island.
