= Steamboat Slough =

Branch of the Sacramento River

Steamboat Slough is an alternate branch of the Sacramento River, named for its popular use by steamboats traveling between San Francisco and Sacramento. Its mouth is found at an elevation of 3 feet (0.9 m), 2 miles (3 km) above Rio Vista, between Grand Island and Ryer Island. Its head is 11 miles (18 km) above where it leaves the Sacramento River, between Sutter Island and Grand Island, at an elevation of 26 feet (8 m) at 38°18′17″N 121°34′25″W.

It is crossed by the Howard Landing Ferry.
