= Ryer Island =

Island in California

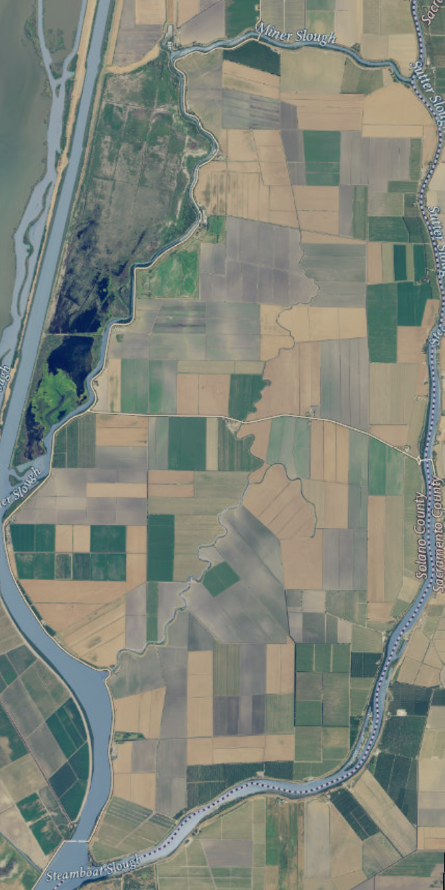
- USGS aerial imagery of the island.

- Location within Sacramento-San Joaquin River Delta Location within California Location within the United States

Geography
- Location: Northern California
- Coordinates: 38.24357°N 121.63101°W
- Adjacent to: Sacramento-San Joaquin River Delta
- Area: 11,700 acres (4,700 ha)

Administration
- United States
- State: California
- County: Solano

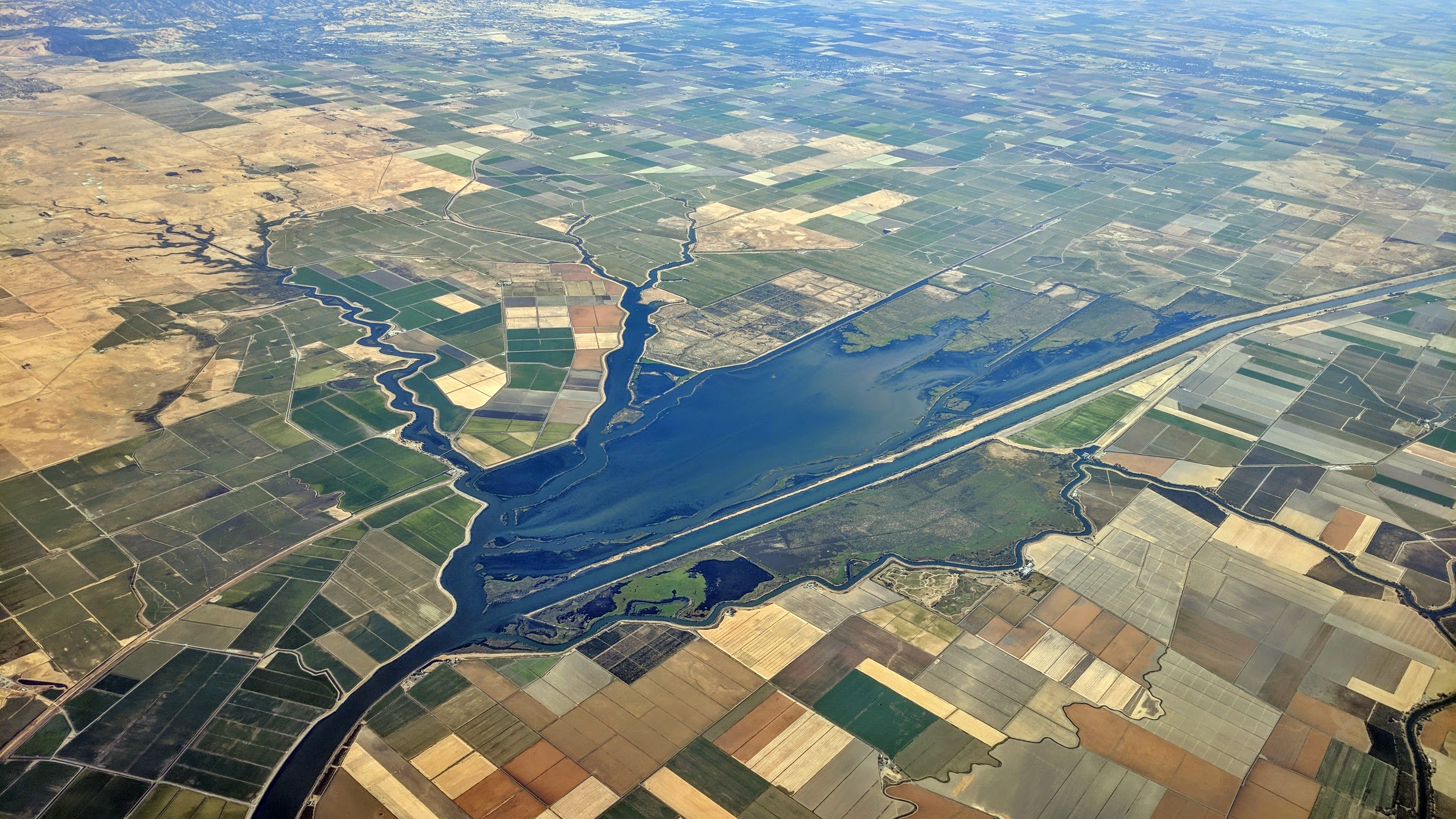
An aerial photo looking northwest, taken in 2018. Ryer Island can be seen on the bottom.

Ryer Island is an island in the Sacramento-San Joaquin River Delta surrounded by Miner Slough and Steamboat Slough at their confluence with the Sacramento River, 6.5 miles north-northeast of Rio Vista. It is in Solano County, California, and managed by Reclamation District 501. The 4,750 ha (11,700-acre) island is named in honor of a California pioneer, Dr. Washington M. Ryer, and his family. A map prepared at the time of statehood shows the area divided by the west fork of the Sacramento River, with the western half identified as Priest Island and the eastern half identified as Sutter Island.

The California Department of Transportation (Caltrans) operates two vehicle ferry services to the island, connecting the following state highways:

- SR 84 south / Ryer Island Ferry, towards Rio Vista
- SR 220 east / Howard Landing Ferry, towards Ryde

Highway 220 then terminates at Highway 84 on Ryer Island, while the latter leaves the island north on a bridge, and towards West Sacramento.

== See also ==
- List of islands of California
- Ryer Island Ferry
- Howard Landing Ferry
