= Ryde, California =

Unincorporated community in California, United States

- Unincorporated community
- Location within California Location within the United States
- Coordinates: 38°14′19″N 121°33′38″W
- Country: United States
- State: California
- County: Sacramento
- Elevation: 0 ft (0 m)
- Time zone: UTC-8 (Pacific (PST))
  - Summer (DST): UTC-7 (PDT)
- ZIP code: 95680
- Area codes: 916, 279
- GNIS feature ID: 252785

Ryde is an unincorporated community in Sacramento County, California, United States. Ryde is located on the Sacramento River at the junction of California State Route 160 and California State Route 220, 6 miles (9.7 km) north-northeast of Isleton. Ryde has a post office with ZIP code 95680, which was established in 1892. William Kesner planned the community on land he purchased from Judge Williams in 1892; Williams devised the name from Ryde, Isle of Wight.
